= Badr =

Badr (Arabic: بدر) as a given name below is an Arabic masculine and feminine name given to the "full moon on its fourteenth night" or the ecclesiastical full moon. Badr may refer to:

== Places ==
- Badr, Egypt, a city
- Badr, Libya, a town in Libya
- Badr, Saudi Arabia, a city in Saudi Arabia
  - Battle of Badr, a battle in the early days of Islam near the present-day city
- Badr Rural District (disambiguation), various administrative subdivisions of Iran
- Ash-Shaykh Badr, a city in Syria
- Hala-'l Badr, a volcano in Saudi Arabia
- Sheikh Badr, a depopulated village in Jerusalem

== People ==
- Badr (name)

== Military ==
- Operation Badr (disambiguation), any of four war operations
- Badr-1 (rocket), Yemeni rocket artillery system
- Badr-2000, Iraqi proposed ballistic missile
- PNS Badr

== Other ==
- Badr Airlines, based in Khartoum, Sudan
- Badr Organization, a political party in Iraq
- Badr (satellite), a series of satellites operated by Pakistan, including:
  - Badr-1, launched in 1990
  - Badr-B or Badr-2, launched in 2001
- Badr-4, an ArabSat satellite
- Badr-6, an ArabSat satellite

== See also ==
- Bader, a surname
- Baader, a surname
- Al-Badr (disambiguation)
- Badri (disambiguation)
