= Bader =

Bader is a German occupational surname derived from the German word "Bad" meaning "bath". It originally referred to the owners or attendants of bathhouses, who subsequently took on other tasks including cutting hair and dentistry.

== List of people with surname Bader ==
- Alexander Bader (born 1965), German clarinetist
- Alfred Bader (1924–2018), Canadian industrialist and art collector
- Ali Bader (born 1970), Iraqi-Belgian novelist
- Art Bader (1886–1957), Major League Baseball player
- Beth Bader (born 1973), American professional golfer
- Clarisse Bader (1840–1902), French writer
- Curt Bader (born 1961), American sprint canoer
- David Bader (disambiguation), several people
- Dewan Bader (born 1971), American soccer player
- Diedrich Bader (born 1966), American actor
- Douglas Bader (1910–1982), British fighter pilot and amputee
- Édouard Bader (1899–1983), French rugby union player
- Ernest Bader (1890–1982), English Quaker businessman and philanthropist
- Ernst Bader (1914–1999), German actor, composer and songwriter
- Ferdinand Bader (born 1981), German ski jumper
- Gershom Bader (1868–1953), Galician-American writer
- Gretta Bader (1931–2014), American sculptor
- Hans-Dieter Bader (1938–2022), German operatic tenor
- Harrison Bader (born 1994), American baseball outfielder
- Helen Daniels Bader (1927–1989), American social worker and philanthropist
- Issam Bader (1948–2003), Palestinian painter, ceramicist, and art educator
- Jeffrey A. Bader (1945–2023), United States Ambassador
- Jesse Moren Bader (1886–1963), American evangelist and Christian leader
- Kristina Bader (born 1981), Soviet-born German bobsledder
- Lore Bader (1888–1973), American baseball pitcher
- Marina Rice Bader, Canadian-American writer, director, and film producer
- Martin Bader (ski mountaineer) (born 1985), Austrian ski mountaineer
- Márton Báder (born 1980), Hungarian professional basketball player
- Menachem Bader (1895–1985), Israeli politician
- Monika Bader (born 1959), German alpine skier
- Pascal Bader (born 1982), Swiss footballer
- Paul Bader (1883–1971), German General der Artillerie in the Wehrmacht
- Pepi Bader (1941–2021), German bobsledder
- Richard F. W. Bader (1931–2012), Canadian chemist
- Roland Bader (born 1938), German choral conductor and music director
- Ryan Bader (born 1983), American mixed martial arts fighter
- Ruth Bader Ginsburg (1933–2020), United States Supreme Court Justice
- Théophile Bader (1864–1942), French businessman and art collector
- Travis Bader (born 1991), American basketball player
- William B. Bader (1931–2016), United States politician
- Yaarub Bader (born 1959), minister of transport of Syria
- Yohanan Bader (1901–1994), Revisionist Zionist leader and Israeli politician

== Given name ==
- Bader Arslan, columnist, economist in Türkiye

== See also ==
- Baade (surname)
- Baader
- Badr (disambiguation)
