= How to Be an Extremely Reform Jew =

1994 book by David M. Bader

- Author: David M. Bader
- Language: English
- Genre: Non-fiction
- Publisher: Avon Books
- Publication date: 1994

How to Be an Extremely Reform Jew (Avon Books, 1994; Extremely Limited 2014) is a book by David M. Bader, the author of Haikus for Jews: For You a Little Wisdom (Harmony Books, 1999), Zen Judaism: For You a Little Enlightenment (Harmony Books, 2002), and Haiku U.: From Aristotle to Zola, Great Books in 17 Syllables (Gotham Books, 2004). It is the source for some Jewish humor circulated on the Internet, often without attribution, such as "The Feast and Fast Yo-Yo Diet Guide to the Holidays," "The Ten Suggestions" and "The Extremely Reform Passover Haggadah." A reprint edition of the book was published in November, 2014.

The book started off as Bader's website called ExtremelyReform.org, with several of Bader's ideas, among them The Ten Suggestions, and The Jewish Calendar Explained. The website has not been archived on WebArchive
