= Higher Command LXV =

German army Corps during WW II

The Höheres Kommando z.b.V. LXV (en : Higher Command for Special Duties LXV) was a special Corps in the German Army during World War II.

== History ==
The Corps was formed on 21 May 1941 in Schneidemühl in Wehrkreis II, to replace German combat troops that had participated in the Invasion of Yugoslavia (6–18 April 1941).
In February 1942, the commander became also the representative commander-in-chief of Serbia.
On 1 March 1942, the Corps was expanded to 4 divisions and became the Occupation Force of the Territory of the Military Commander in Serbia.

== Commanders ==
- General der Artillerie Paul Bader (25 May 1941 - 1 March 1942).

== Composition ==
- 704th Infantry Division, headquartered at Valjevo in the west
- 714th Infantry Division, headquartered at Topola roughly in the centre of the territory
- 717th Infantry Division, headquartered at Niš
- 718th Infantry Division, was deployed in the adjacent parts of the NDH.

== See also ==
- List of German corps in World War II
