= David Bader =

David Bader may refer to:

- David Bader (computer scientist) (born 1969), American professor of computing
- David Bader (writer), zen and haiku writer
- David Bader (footballer) (born 1969), Swiss footballer
