= Baade =

Baade may refer to:

- Baade (crater), a lunar impact crater
- Baade 152, the first German jet passenger airliner
- One of the Magellan telescopes at Las Campanas Observatory in Chile
- Baade (surname), list of people with this name

== See also ==
- 1501 Baade, asteroid
- Baade's Window, an area of sky important for astronomical observations
- Vallis Baade, a valley on the Moon
