= 2nd Infantry Division (Wehrmacht) =

2nd Infantry Division 2nd Motorized Infantry Division
- German: 2. Infanterie-Division; 2. Infanterie-Division (mot.)
- Division insignia
- Active: 12 October 1937 – 10 January 1941
- Disbanded: Renamed 12th Panzer Division 10 January 1941
- Country: Nazi Germany
- Branch: German Army
- Type: Panzergrenadier
- Role: Maneuver warfare Raiding
- Size: Division
- Nickname: Pomeranian Division
- Engagements: World War II: Invasion of Poland

The 2nd Infantry Division of Nazi Germany's Army was created from components of the Reichswehr's old 2nd Division in 1934, at first under the cover name Wehrgauleitung Stettin and later Artillerieführer II; it did not take its real name until October 1935. It was upgraded to 2nd Motorized Infantry Division in 1937, and fought under that name in Heinz Guderian's XIX Corps during the 1939 Invasion of Poland, first in the cut across the Polish Corridor to reach East Prussia and then as support for the push on Brest-Litovsk. It was then transferred to the west, where it took part in the 1940 Battle of France.

In October 1940 the division was reorganized as the 12th Panzer Division.

== Commanding officers ==
- Generalleutnant Hubert Gercke (10 October 1935 – 1 April 1937)
- Generalleutnant Paul Bader (1 April 1937 – 1 October 1940)
