= Baader =

Origin
- Language: German

Other names
- See also: Baade

Baader is a surname of German origin.

== People with the surname Baader ==
- Andreas Baader (1943–1977), militant of the Red Army Faction (Rote Armee Fraktion), also known as the Baader Meinhoff Gang
- Caspar Baader (born 1953), Swiss politician
- Franz Xaver von Baader (1765–1841), German philosopher and theologian
- Johannes Baader (1875–1955), architect, writer and artist associated with Dada
- Joseph von Baader (1763–1835), German railway pioneer
- Louis-Marie Baader (1828–1920), French painter
- Ottilie Baader (1847–1925), German women's right activist and socialist

== See also ==
- Baade (surname)
- Bader
- Badr (disambiguation)
