= Badri =

Badri may refer to:

== Films ==
- Badri (2000 film), an Indian Telugu-language romantic drama film starring Pawan Kalyan
- Badri (2001 film), an Indian Tamil-language sports action film starring Vijay

== Military ==
- Badri 313 Battalion in Afghanistan

== People ==
=== Surname ===
- Omar el-Badri, Libyan politician, 7th Secretary General of OPEC
- Abdallah Salem el-Badri, Libyan politician, 20th and 27th Secretary General of OPEC
- Abdul Qadir al-Badri, former Prime Minister of Libya
- Balghis Badri, Sudanese feminist activist and social anthropologist
- Haitham al-Badri, Al-Qaeda in Iraq member
- Abu Bakr al-Baghdadi, born Ibrahim al-Badri
- Abd al-Aziz al-Badri, Iraqi Islamic scholar
- Saleh al-Badri, Iraqi poet
- Faisal Al Badri, Libyan footballer
- Salem Amer Al-Badri, Kenyan middle-distance runner
- Anice Badri, Tunisian professional footballer
- Hossam El Badry, Egyptian football coach and former player

=== Given name ===
- Badri Patarkatsishvili, Georgian businessman
- Badri Kvaratskhelia, Georgian-Azerbaijani footballer
- Badri (director), Indian film director in Tamil cinema

== See also ==
- Badr (disambiguation)
