= Al-Badr (disambiguation) =

Al-Badr may refer to:

== Groups/organisations ==
- Al-Badr (Jammu and Kashmir), an organization active in Kashmir
- Al-Badr (East Pakistan), a militia supportive of Pakistan in the Bangladesh Liberation War

== Places ==
- Al Badr, Saudi Arabia, a village in Makkah Province, in western Saudi Arabia

== See also ==
- Badr (disambiguation)
- Badir, a name
