= Zen Judaism: For You a Little Enlightenment =

Book by David M. Bader

- Author: David M. Bader
- Publisher: Harmony/Rodale
- Publication date: August 13, 2002
- ISBN: 9780609610213

Zen Judaism: For You a Little Enlightenment (Harmony Books, 2002) is a humor book by David M. Bader, the author of Haikus for Jews: For You a Little Wisdom (1999) and Haiku U.: From Aristotle to Zola, Great Books in 17 Syllables (Gotham Books, 2004).

Widely circulated in e-mails and quoted on web pages, often without attribution, this collection of Jewish Zen combines Eastern wisdom and advice with Jewish kvetching.

The following are examples from the book:

- The Journey of a thousand miles begins with a single "Oy."
- There is no escaping karma. In a previous life, you never called, you never wrote, you never visited. And whose fault was that?
- To know the Buddha is the highest attainment. Second highest is to go to the same doctor as the Buddha.
