= Baade (surname) =

Origin
- Language: German

Other names
- See also: Baader

Baade is a surname of German origin. Notable people with the surname include:

- Brunolf Baade (1904–1969), German aeronautical engineer
- Carrie Ann Baade (born 1974), American painter
- Else Baade (1911–1965), Danish swimmer
- Ernst-Günther Baade (1897–1945), German general
- Fritz Baade (1893–1974), German politician
- Knud Baade (1808–1879), Norwegian painter
- Paul Baade (born 1940), American politician
- Paul W. Baade (1889–1959), American army officer
- Walter Baade (1893–1960), German astronomer

== See also ==
- Baade (disambiguation)
- Baader, another German surname
