= PNS Badr =

PNS Badr may refer to following ships of Pakistan Navy:

- PNS Badr (1957), the former British Battle-class destroyer HMS Gabbard (D47) acquired by Pakistan in 1957 and scrapped in 1985.
- PNS Badr (1989), the former United States Brooke-class frigate USS Julius A. Furer (FFG-6) acquired by Pakistan in 1989 and returned in 1993. She was scrapped in 1994.
- PNS Badr (1994), the former British Type 21 frigate HMS Alacrity (F174) acquired by Pakistan in 1994.
