= Operation Badr =

Operation Badr may refer to:

- Battle of Badr (624), the armed conflict between Muhammad's Muslim army and Amr ibn Hisham's Mushrikite army
- Operation Badr (1973), the successful Egyptian military offensive against Israel
- Operation Badr (1985), the failed Iranian military offensive against Iraq
- Operation Badr (1999), the failed Pakistani invasion of India's Kargil district in Kashmir
- Operation Badr (2011), the series of Taliban attacks across Afghanistan
