= Badr Rural District =

Badr Rural District (Persian: دهستان بدر) may refer to:

- Badr Rural District (Kermanshah Province)
- Badr Rural District (Kurdistan Province)
