= David Bader (writer) =

American writer

David M. Bader
- Education: Harvard College; Harvard Law School
- Occupations: Author and Former attorney

David M. Bader is an author and former attorney.

== Early life, family and education ==
Bader is a graduate of Harvard College and Harvard Law School.

== Career ==
Bader was an attorney, and he worked at two law firms, but he eventually focused instead on his career as a writer.

His first book was How to Be an Extremely Reform Jew (Avon Books, 1994). Other works include The Book of Murray: The Life, Teachings, and Kvetching of the Lost Prophet (Harmony Books, 2010), Haiku U.: From Aristotle to Zola: Great Books in 17 Syllables (Gotham Books, 2004), Haikus for Jews: For You a Little Wisdom (Harmony Books, 1999), Zen Judaism: For You a Little Enlightenment (Harmony Books, 2002). He has contributed to the Mirth of a Nation humor anthologies.

== In popular culture ==
Tom Magliozzi read selections from two of Bader's books Haikus for Jews and Zen Judaism on NPR's radio program Car Talk.

Excerpts from Bader's books have been widely circulated on the web and in e-mail, in most cases without permission. As William Novak notes, "his work has been all over the Internet without attribution."

== Personal life ==
David M. Bader resides and works in New York City.
