= Badr, Libya =

Badr بدر
- Town
- Location in Libya
- Coordinates: 32°01′00″N 11°30′00″E
- Country: Libya
- Region: Tripolitania
- District: Nalut
- Elevation: 2,881 ft (878 m)

Population (2010)
  - Total: 18,693
- Time zone: UTC+2 (EET)

Badr (Arabic: بدر, /ˈbɑːdər/ is a small town in the Nalut District in northwestern Libya, with a population of 18,693 as of 2010. Prior to the 2007 reorganization of districts, it was part of Yafran District. The town is currently home to the Alseaan (El-See’an) tribes, who moved into the area in the early to mid 20th century replacing the Al-Haraba tribes. Discoveries in the late 20th century showed a large quantity of oil and gas underlying the area.

== History ==
Under the Ottomans, Badr was first part of the Villayet of Tripoli and then Tripolitania. Under the Italians in 1934, it became part of the province of Tripoli. Immediately after World War II it was administered by the French military as part of the territory of Ghadames. After independence, it was part of the Tripolitania Governorate.
