= Paul Bader =

German general (1883–1971)

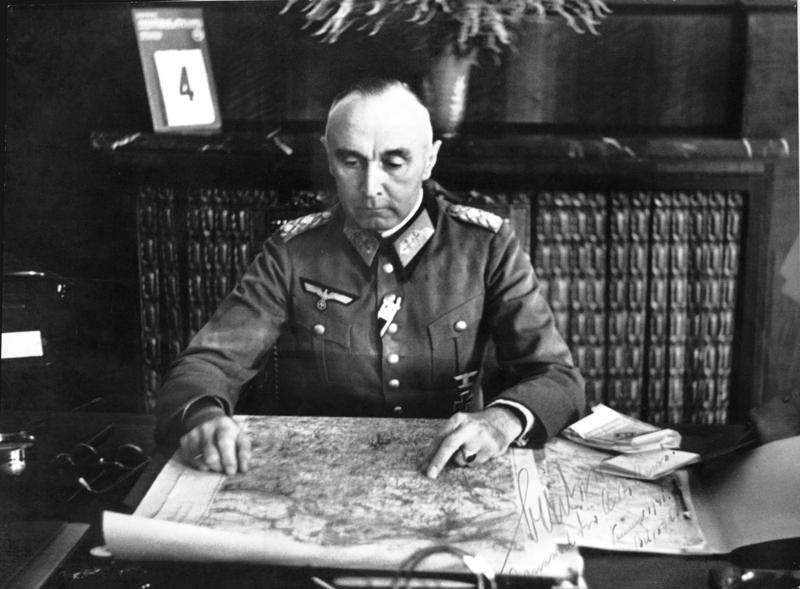
- Paul Bader in summer 1941
- Born: July 20, 1883; Lahr, Grand Duchy of Baden, Germany
- Died: February 28, 1971 (aged 87); Emmendingen, West Germany
- Military career
- Allegiance: German Empire; Weimar Republic; Nazi Germany
- Branch: German Army
- Service years: 1903–1944
- Rank: General der Artillerie
- Commands: 2nd Motorized Infantry Division; 3rd Motorized Infantry Division; Höheres Kommando z.b.V. LXV; Military Commander in Serbia; XXI Mountain Corps
- Conflicts: World War I; Western Front (World War I); World War II; Invasion of Poland; Battle of France; World War II in Yugoslavia; Operation Uzice; Operation Southeast Croatia; Operation Trio
- Awards: Iron Cross (1914) 2nd and 1st Class with repetition clasps (1939) in 2nd and 1st Class; Knights Cross 1st Class of the Friedrich Order with swords Knight, 2nd Class of the Order of the Zähringer Lion with swords and oak leaves Hanseatic Cross; German Cross in Gold

Paul Bader (20 July 1883 – 28 February 1971) was a General der Artillerie (lieutenant general) of the Wehrmacht during World War II who commanded the 2nd Motorized Infantry Division in the invasions of Poland and France then served as a corps commander and as Military Commander in Serbia. During his time in occupied Yugoslavia troops under his command engaged in several major anti-Partisan operations, within both the Territory of the Military Commander in Serbia and in the Independent State of Croatia.

== Early service and World War I ==
Bader joined the Prussian Army in 1903 at the age of 20, as an Einjährig-Freiwilliger (volunteer reserve officer) and was subsequently accepted as a Fahnenjunker (officer candidate) and attended the Kriegsschule (War School). While awaiting his commission he was appointed as a Fähnrich (junior non-commissioned officer) in the 66th Field Artillery Regiment of the 39th Division. He was commissioned into the regiment on 21 May 1906 as a Leutnant (lieutenant). In 1912, he was transferred to the 80th Field Artillery Regiment.

On 20 November 1913, he was promoted to Oberleutnant (first lieutenant) and was appointed as the adjutant to the commander of the 80th Field Artillery Regiment. The regiment was deployed to Kolmar in Alsace-Lorraine and at the outbreak of World War I they saw action along the eastern border of Germany known as the Battle of the Frontiers. The 39th Division then participated in the Race to the Sea between September and November 1914, which brought the 39th Division to a position along the Yser River in Flanders, Belgium. While on this part of the front, the 39th Division fought in the Battle of the Yser. In April 1915, Bader was promoted to Hauptmann (captain) and was appointed as the adjutant to the commander of the 39th Field Artillery Brigade. After deploying to northeastern France in early 1916 the division reinforced the German attack at Verdun. During the remainder of the war, Bader remained with the 39th Division, which fought in the Battle of the Somme, the Second Battle of the Aisne, the Battle of Passchendaele, and the German spring offensive of 1918.

== Interwar years ==
During the interwar years Bader remained active in the German artillery forces of the Reichswehr, and was promoted to major (major) in 1925. Between 1919 and 1928, he commanded various artillery batteries. As part of the expansion of the German military starting in 1933, Bader was promoted to oberst (colonel) and commanded several artillery regiments including the 5th Artillery Regiment and the Artillery Regiment "Ludwigsburg". He was promoted to generalmajor (brigadier) in 1935, and took command of the 2nd Infantry Division on 1 April 1937. The division was subsequently renamed the 2nd Motorised Infantry Division and Bader was promoted to generalleutnant (major general) in 1938.

== World War II ==
=== Poland and France ===
When war broke out in 1939, Bader commanded the 2nd Motorized Infantry Division during the invasion of Poland, where it formed part of Heinz Guderian's XIX Corps within the 4th Army of Army Group North. In September 1939, Army Group North drove east from Western Pomerania to cut the Polish Corridor to East Prussia, then fulfilled a support role during the advance towards Brest-Litovsk.

Following the successful end of the Polish campaign, Bader's division was transferred to the west to prepare for the invasion of France. The division formed part of the XIV Corps within Panzer Group "Kleist" of Gerd von Rundstedt's Army Group A. In May and June 1940, Army Group A thrust through the Ardennes, across the Meuse and towards the Channel Ports of Dunkirk and Calais then south to outflank the Maginot Line. Bader commanded the 2nd Motorised Division until October 1940 when it returned to Germany and was re-organised as the 12th Panzer Division. In October 1940, Bader was appointed as the commander of the 3rd Motorised Infantry Division which had also returned to Germany to be re-fitted as a fully motorised division in preparation for Operation Barbarossa.

=== Yugoslavia ===
In May 1941, just before the division was committed to the attack on the Soviet Union, Bader was replaced as commander of the 3rd Motorised Infantry Division and on 1 July 1941 he was promoted to General der Artillerie (lieutenant general) and was appointed as the commander of the Higher Command LXV, which was essentially a corps headquarters commanding four garrison divisions stationed in occupied Yugoslavia, three in the Territory of the Military Commander in Serbia and one in the Independent State of Croatia. After assisting with the crushing of the uprising in Serbia, Bader became the Plenipotentiary General in Serbia on 6 December 1941, then in February 1942 was re-titled the Commanding General and Military Commander in Serbia.

Bader ordered on January 3, 1942 that admitting Jews into their homes and hiding their things and value papers is punishable by death. On February 8 he ordered that saboteurs should be executed, hanged on the spot if possible to terrify the population and that only in special cases hostages can be taken. On October 10 Bader decided that disappeared German soldiers should be counted as dead for retributions. Massacre in Kriva Reka during Operation Kopaonik committed by SS Prinz Eugen became huge news in Serbia and people started talking about terror of SS Prinz Eugen. Bader had to warn the unit not to order similar actions without a reason, because it could cause negative consequences. He also thought that unit was "too used to Balkan methods" On insistence of August Meyszner, Bader ordered additional measures against resistance on October 5 accord to which family members of uprisers could either be fined, sent to Germany as forced labour or executed in reprisals on August 6, 1943.

On 26 August 1943 he was transferred to command the newly created XXI Mountain Corps in Albania, however he was only in this position for a few months before he was placed on the Führerreserve list in October 1943 then retired on 31 March 1944, having served in the German Army for 41 years.

== Death ==
Paul Bader died on 28 February 1971 in Emmendingen, Germany, aged 87.

== Decorations and awards ==
- Iron Cross (1914), 1st and 2nd class
- Knight's Cross of the Friedrich Order, 1st class with swords (Kingdom of Württemberg)
- Knight's Cross Second Class of the Order of the Zähringer Lion with swords and oak leaves (Baden)
- Hanseatic Cross (Hamburg)
- Clasp to the Iron Cross, 1st and 2nd class
- German Cross in Gold on 29 January 1943 as General der Artillerie and commander in Serbia
