= Battle of Chojnice (1939) =

Battle of the Invasion of Poland during WWII

Coordinates: 53°42′00″N 17°34′00″E

- Part of the Invasion of Poland
Date	1 September 1939
Location	Chojnice, Pomeranian Voivodeship, Poland
Result	German victory

Belligerents
Germany	Poland

Commanders and leaders
(Nazi Germany) Mauritz von Wiktorin	(Second Polish Republic) Tadeusz Majewski

The Battle of Chojnice occurred during the 1939 German invasion of Poland on the first day of the hostilities, 1 September. A detached unit from the Polish army Chojnice Detached Group under Colonel Kazimierz Tadeusz Majewski, part of the Czersk Operational Group under Stanisław Grzmot-Skotnicki, was assigned the task of defending the city of Chojnice, a major regional communications center, against the advancing German 20th Motorized Infantry Division in order to protect the southern flank of Army Pomorze.

The German attacks started at 04:30 with Stuka dive bombers, from 3/1 Stuka Geschwader, attacking the Tczew bridge. The Wehrmacht then tried to sneak armoured cars into the station, but the Poles destroyed the bridge beforehand. Finally, an armored train attack on Chojnice was repulsed.

The Polish troops managed to hold back the German advance until the early afternoon, but at 14:00 the German troops threatened to surround the city and the Polish units were forced to retreat east towards Rytel. The 18th Pomeranian Uhlan Regiment was ordered to cover the retreat of the infantry, and launched a mounted attack against the Germans at Krojanty.

== See also ==
- nearby Charge at Krojanty
- List of World War II military equipment of Poland
- List of German military equipment of World War II
