= List of Polish armies in World War II =

The following is a list of Polish Armies during World War II, together with their commanders and brigade and division-sized units. For a more detailed list see: Polish army order of battle in 1939.

Key
Formed before the war	Blue
Formed during the war in Poland	Green
Formed in exile at later stages of the war	Red

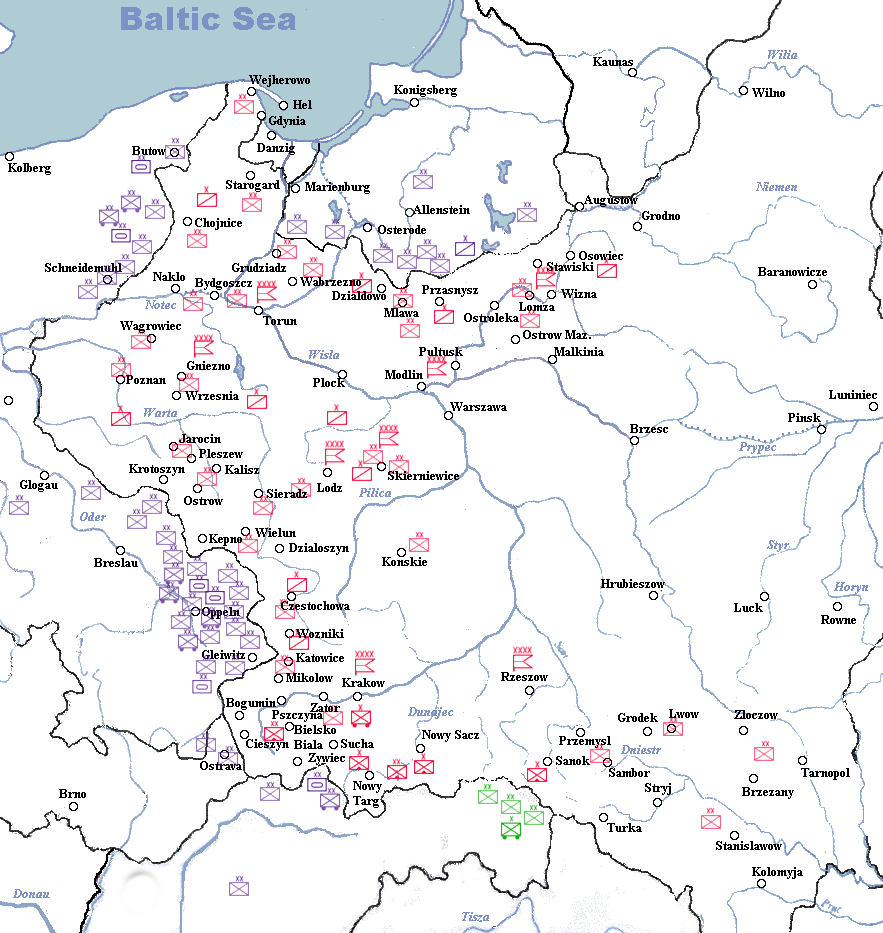
Placement of divisions on September 1, 1939

Karpaty Army (Armia Karpaty); Kazimierz Fabrycy; 2nd and 3rd Mountain Bdes, 11th Inf.Div, 24th Inf.Div, 38th Inf.Div
Kraków Army (Armia Kraków); Antoni Szylling; 6th, 7th, 21st Mountain, 22nd Mountain, 23rd, 55th Infantry Divisions, 10th Mot., Kraków Cav.Bde., 1st Mountain
Łódź Army (Armia Łódź); Juliusz Rómmel, Wiktor Thommée; 2nd Legions, 10th, 28th, 30th Infantry Divisions, Wołyńska and Kresowa Cavalry Brigades
Modlin Army (Armia Modlin); Emil Krukowicz-Przedrzymirski; 8th and 20th Infantry Divisions, Mazowiecka and Nowogródzka Cavalry Brigades, Warsaw BON
Pomorze Army (Armia Pomorze); Władysław Bortnowski; 4th, 9th, 15th, 16th and 27th Infantry Divisions, Pomorska Cavalry Brigade, Pomorze and Chełm National Defence Bdes, Wisła Independent Unit
Poznań Army (Armia Poznań); Tadeusz Kutrzeba; 14th, 17th, 25th and 26th Inf.Div., Podolska and Wielkopolska Cav.Bdes, Poznań and Kalisz National Defence Bdes
Prusy Army (Armia Prusy); Stefan Dąb-Biernacki; 3rd Legions, 12th, 13th, 19th, 29th and 36th Inf.Div, Wileńska Cavalry Brigade
Lublin Army (Armia Lublin); Tadeusz Piskor; 39th Inf.Div., Motorised Bde, Sandomierz Group, Komorowski's Cavalry Group
Małopolska Army (Armia Małopolska); Kazimierz Fabrycy; See:Karpaty Army above
Warszawa Army (Armia Warszawa); Juliusz Rómmel, Walerian Czuma, Wiktor Thommée
Polish Army in France (Wojsko Polskie we Francji); Władysław Sikorski; 1st Grenadier, 2nd Rifle, 10th Armoured Brigade Bde
I Corps (I Korpus Polski); Stanisław Maczek; 1st Armoured Division, 1st Para Brigade
II Corps (II Korpus Polski); Władysław Anders; 3rd and 5th Infantry Divisions, 2nd Armoured Division
First Army (1 Armia Wojska Polskiego); Zygmunt Berling; 1st, 2nd, 3rd, 4th and 6th Infantry Divisions, Armoured Bde, Cavalry Bde
Second Army (2 Armia Wojska Polskiego); Karol Świerczewski; 5th, 7th, 8th, 9th, 10th Inf. Divs, 16th Armoured Bde

During the Invasion of Poland several divisions were grouped into two units smaller than armies: the Wyszków Operational Group and the Narew Independent Operational Group.

== See also ==
- Air Force of the Polish Army (in the East)
- Polish Air Forces in France and Great Britain
- Polish Navy in World War II
- List of Polish divisions in World War II
- Polish army order of battle in 1939
- Polish contribution to World War II
