= Independent Operational Group Silesia =

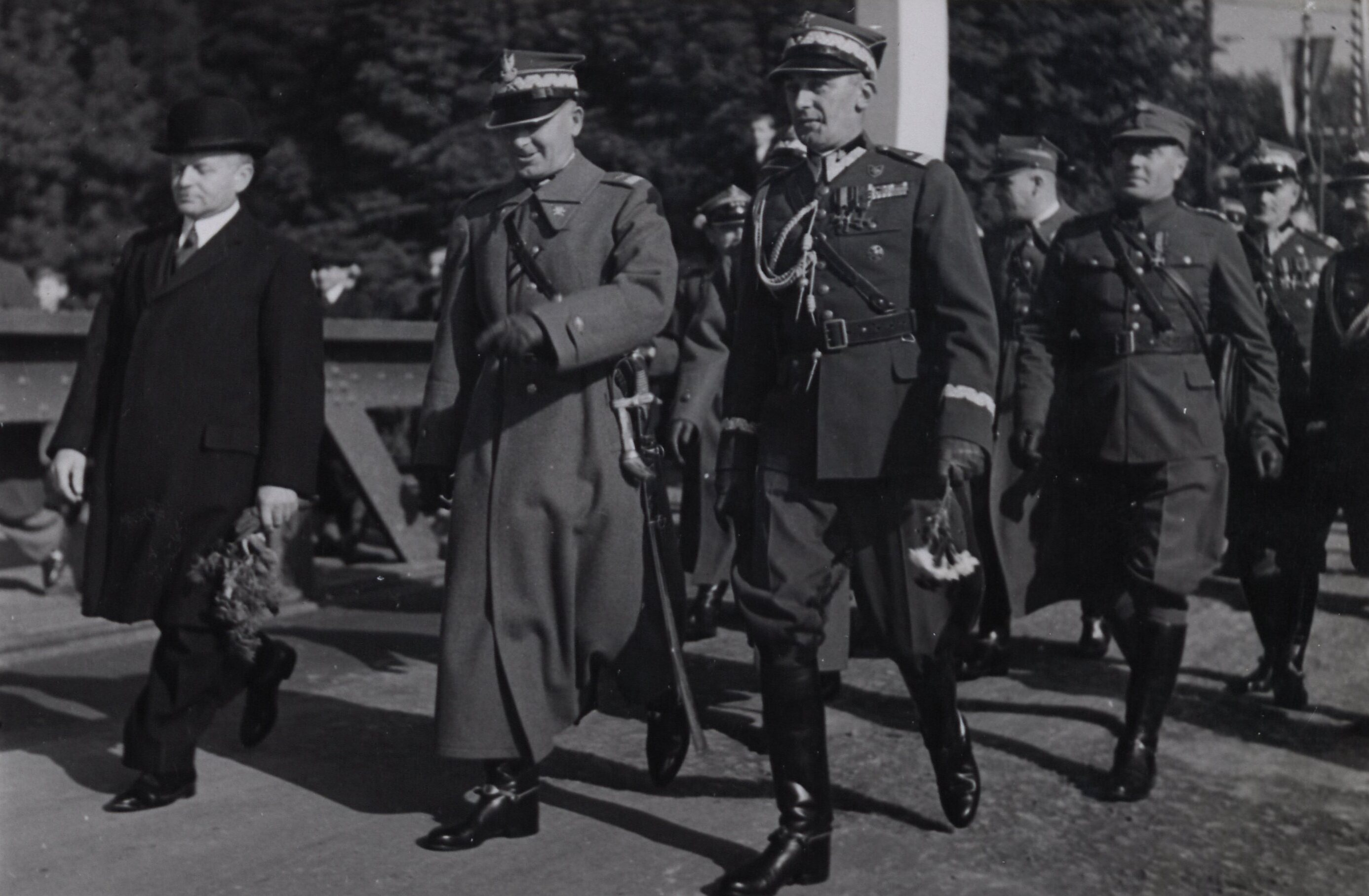
Silesian Voivode Michał Grażyński, Marshal Edward Rydz-Śmigły, and General Władysław Bortnowski in Czech Cieszyn, 12 October 1938

Independent Operational Group Silesia (Polish: Samodzielna Grupa Operacyjna Śląsk, SGO Śląsk) was an Operational Group of the Polish Army, created in September 1938 to annex Trans-Olza (Zaolzie) from Czechoslovakia.

== History ==
The Group was commanded by General Władysław Bortnowski and comprised several Army units and five air squadrons. Altogether, 35,966 Polish officers and soldiers participated in the annexation of Zaolzie.

The Group comprised mostly units of the 4th Infantry Division, as well as regiments of the 14th Infantry Division, 15th Infantry Division, 16th Infantry Division, 23rd Infantry Division, 25th Infantry Division, and 21st Mountain Infantry Division. Additionally, a cavalry regiment was created, comprising units of the Wielkopolska Cavalry Brigade and the Pomeranian Cavalry Brigade.

== Annexation of Zaolzie region ==
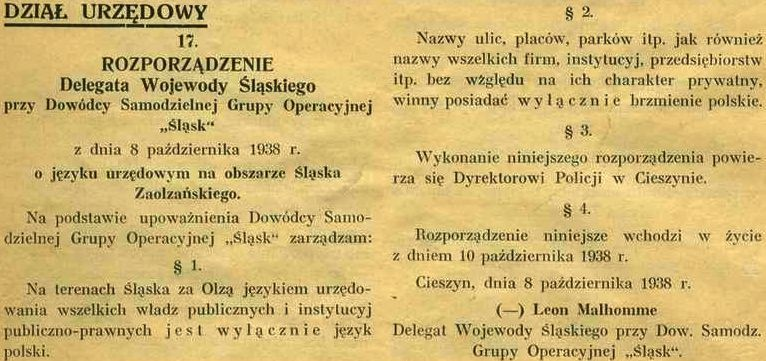
Ruling that mandates exclusive use of Polish language on the annexed territory issued in Czeski Cieszyn by Leon Malhomme

After its creation, the military unit was stationed near the borders of Poland and Czechoslovakia.

As a result of the Munich crisis, the Czechoslovak government yielded to Polish pressure and gave up a part of the Cieszyn Silesia region (namely Trans-Olza/Zaolzie) to Poland (as demanded by Poland under a threat of military action). The Independent Operational Group Silesia was carrying out the annexation from 2 to 11 October 1938.

== Group termination ==
On 9 December 1938 the Independent Operational Group Silesia was ordered to leave the occupied territory and the group was dissolved after that.

== See also ==
- Trans-Olza
- History of Poland (1918-1939)
- Edmund Charaszkiewicz
- Feliks Ankerstein

== Sources ==
- Marek Piotr Deszczyński, Ostatni egzamin. Wojsko Polskie wobec kryzysu czechosłowackiego 1938-1939 (The Final Exam: The Polish Armed Forces in the Czechoslovak Crisis of 1938–1939), Warsaw, 2003.
