= Battle of Tuchola Forest =

Part of the German invasion of Poland

Coordinates: 53°36′00″N 18°00′00″E

- Part of the Invasion of Poland
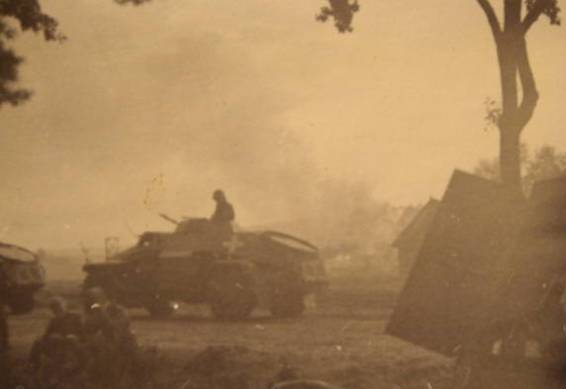
- German armored car Sd.Kfz.221 during the battle.
Date	1–5 September 1939
Location	Near Tuchola Forest, Pomeranian Voivodeship, Poland
Result	German victory

Belligerents
Germany	Poland

Commanders and leaders
Günther von Kluge; Heinz Guderian; Adolf Strauss	Władysław Bortnowski; Stanisław Grzmot-Skotnicki; Józef Werobej; Juliusz Drapella

Casualties and losses
506 killed 743 wounded	1,600 killed 750 wounded Unknown number captured

The Battle of Tuchola Forest (German: Schlacht in der Tucheler Heide, Polish: Bitwa w Borach Tucholskich) was one of the first battles of World War II, during the invasion of Poland. The battle occurred from 1 September to 5 September 1939 and resulted in a major German victory.

Poor Polish command and control, as well as German numerical and tactical superiority, allowed the Germans to cripple Poland's Armia Pomorze (Army Pomerania) and, by breaking through the Polish Corridor, to connect mainland Germany with East Prussia.

The battle was fought against the judgment of General Władysław Bortnowski, the commander of Army Pomerania, who considered the Corridor a very poor defensive position and had repeatedly asked for permission to withdraw his forces from it.

== Prelude ==
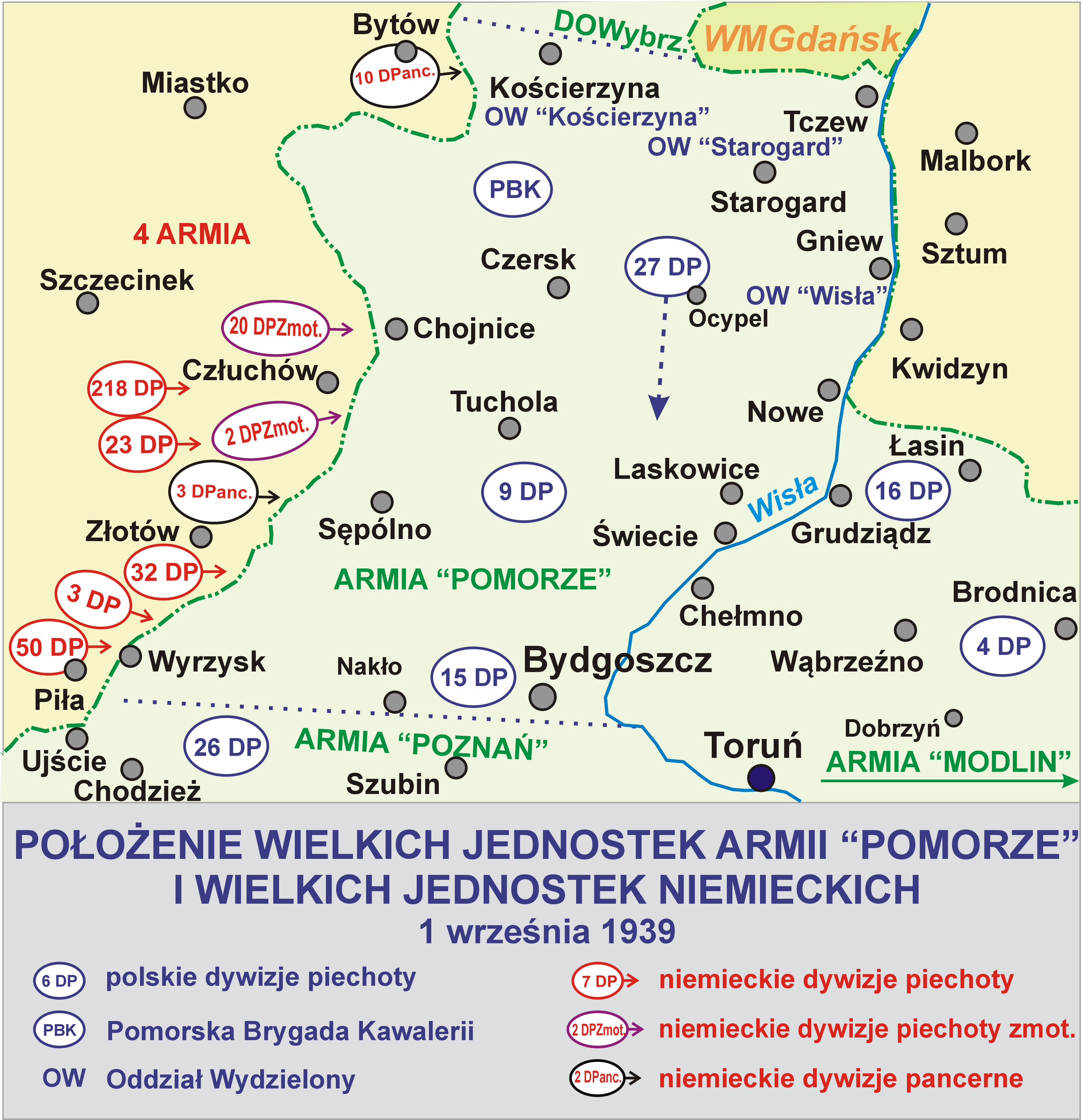
Positions of Polish and German forces before the battle

Tuchola Forest (Polish: Bory Tucholskie, German: Tucheler Heide) in Westprussia, since 1920 Treaty of Versailles in the Polish Corridor, is a large area of mostly forest. Its difficult terrain was thought by the Polish high command as a good defensive position. However, the Germans had held their Truppenübungsplatz Gruppe military exercises in the area until 1919, and were therefore familiar with it, and furthermore General Heinz Guderian had been born in nearby Chełmno).

Polish forces in the theater comprised elements of the Pomeranian Army: 9th Infantry Division under colonel Józef Werobej, the 27th Infantry Division under general Juliusz Drapella, and Czersk Operational Group under gen. Stanisław Grzmot-Skotnicki. Facing the German exclave of East Prussia was the Operational Group East under General Mikołaj Bołtuć, consisting of the 4th Infantry Division and 16th Infantry Division.

German forces in the theater were composed of elements of the 4th German Army under general Günther von Kluge, specifically 19th Panzer Corps (commanded by general Heinz Guderian), and 2nd Army Corps under general Adolf Strauß. Those units were based in Western Pomerania west of the corridor. The XXI Army Corps of the German 3rd Army would simultaneously advance from East Prussia, in a pincer movement across the Polish corridor, while the bulk of the 3rd Army would attack the Modlin Army in the direction of Warsaw.

19th Panzer Corps consisted of the 2nd Motorized Division under general Paul Bader, the 20th Motorized Division under general Mauritz von Wiktorin and the 3rd Panzer Division under general Leo Geyr von Schweppenburg. 2nd Army Corps was composed of two infantry divisions: the 3rd Infantry Division under general Walter Lichel and 32nd Infantry Division under general Franz Böhme.

== Battle ==
=== September 1 ===
Moving quickly after crossing the border at 0445 on September 1, the Wehrmacht forces made contact with the Polish defenses along the Brda River around 0915. The 5th Panzer Regiment of the 3rd Panzer division attempted to seize the railway bridge at Pruszcz, held by the 3rd Battalion of the 34th Infantry Regiment of the Polish 9th Division. The Polish defenders successfully destroyed a Panzer IV tank and held up the Germans for two hours, buying time to partially destroy the bridge at the cost of 22 killed. Meanwhile, the 6th Panzer Regiment attacked Wielka Klonia, held by the 1st Battalion of the 34th Infantry Regiment, and lost two Panzer II tanks to Polish anti-tank fire. The Germans fell back and shelled the village, killing four Poles. Frustrated by these delays, Guderian ordered his motorcyclists to cross the river in rubber boats at Sokole-Kuźnica, this was accomplished by 1800 hours, and after clearing the Polish defenders from the far bank German engineers were able to begin repairs of the bridges over the Brda. To the north of Pruszcz near Gostycyn the 6th Panzer Regiment engaged the remainder of the 34th Infantry Regiment in inconclusive combat which lasted until midnight.

To the north of this action, at 1130 the German 2nd Motorized Infantry Division encountered the Polish 35th Infantry Regiment, also of the 9th Division, dug in near the town of Tuchola. General Bader ordered a series of frontal assaults across flat, marshy terrain which were repeatedly repulsed with considerable casualties until the Polish troops withdrew around 1800 due to the risk of encirclement from the south by Guderian's panzers.

The 20th Motorized Division was tasked with capturing Chojnice, held by three Polish territorial defense (ON) battalions. An initial attempt to seize the city with an armored train and two platoons of commandos failed, and resulted in the destruction of the train by the Polish defenders. During the late morning and early afternoon the 20th Division slowly enveloped the Polish positions, and the ON battalions withdrew at 1400 to avoid encirclement. Their withdrawal to the northeast was covered by a mounted attack by the 18th Pomeranian Uhlan Regiment, known to history as the charge at Krojanty, which managed to scatter the troops of the German 76th Motorized Infantry Regiment, but then encountered a squadron of armored cars, which cut down nearly a third of the Polish riders, including the unit's commander Kazimierz Mastalerz.

The 2nd Army Corps on Guderian's right flank advanced largely unmolested, annihilating the isolated ON battalion defending Wiecbork.

All day on September 1 the German XXI Army Corps, attacking from the exclave of East Prussia, attempted to secure a crossing over the Vistula and link up with Guderian. Their attempt to seize the bridges at Tczew at 0445 was foiled and the bridges were blown up at 0600. The town was captured in the afternoon by Waffen-SS troops advancing south from Danzig. Having failed to secure the bridges, XXI Corps proceeded southwards and became locked in a positional battle with the Polish 16th Infantry Division dug in along the Osa, a minor tributary of the Vistula. It secured a bridgehead at 1600 hours near Rogozno-Zamek.

=== September 2 ===
During the night, General Bortnowski repositioned the 27th Infantry Division southwards to conduct a counterattack against Guderian's bridgehead over the Brda. This attack was meant to be coordinated with the 9th Division but the two units never made contact. On September 2 the 27th Division launched a piecemeal assault on Swiekatowo and Tuszyny which initially drove back the German reconnaissance elements but was broken up by the arrival of German armored cars, which inflicted considerable losses. The 27th Division retreated southwards in disarray.

Troops of the 9th Division, meanwhile, were still engaged in the defenses of the bridges over the Brda at Piła-Młyn, north of the German bridgehead. These were destroyed at 1000. The 35th Regiment, which had repositioned south from Tuchola, launched an attack against the left flank of the 3rd Panzer Division but was repulsed with heavy casualties. The German 32nd Infantry Division, part of the 2nd Corps advancing on Guderian's right, launched its own attack on the 9th Division's 22nd Infantry Regiment, which had not yet been seriously engaged, in the vicinity of Koronowo, and shattered the Polish unit.

Meanwhile, the German XXI Corps, advancing from East Prussia, now had a pontoon bridge over the Osa, and the 21st Infantry Division launched an assault across the river, driving back the Polish 16th Division. The 10th Panzer Regiment drove through the gap, seizing the town of Melno and threatening the rear of the Polish army. This threat of encirclement sparked a panic among the troops of the 16th Division, which began to scatter and retreat southwards. The 4th Infantry Division, positioned to the right of the 16th, launched a counterattack to relieve the beleaguered Polish unit and had some initial success, taking 100 German prisoners, but the attack ran out of steam, and the German XXI Corps continued to push towards the southwest.

By the end of the day, a significant portion of the Polish forces were disorganized or in retreat, with the remainder facing the threat of encirclement by the German pincer movement. The remainder of the 9th Division, including the 35th and 22nd Regiments, began to disengage and join the retreat southwards towards Bydgoszcz, where the 15th Division was still dug in.

=== September 3 ===
On September 3, Guderian recognized the situation of the Polish forces and began orienting most of his force towards Bydgoszcz, sending only reconnaissance elements onwards to secure Chelmno. Around noon the German Luftwaffe began to launch air attacks on the retreating Polish columns which inflicted heavy losses, including most of the 9th Division's artillery. Some troops of the 9th and 27th Divisions were caught by the advancing panzers and surrounded near the village of Bukowiec, where 846 Polish troops were captured by the 3rd Panzer Division after a three-hour battle. Pressed up against the Vistula with their route to Bydgoszcz cut, 4,000 Polish troops would be captured by the end of the day, with only the 35th Infantry Regiment managing to escape.

In Bydgoszcz, Gen. Bortnowski had at his disposal the 15th infantry division, about one third of the 2nd infantry division, two surviving battalions of the 22nd regiment, and about a quarter of the Pomorska cavalry brigade. Nearly all were disorganized and exhausted. Bortnowski decided to abandon the city and establish a new defensive line on the south bank of the Vistula, but roughly 1,000 German Nazi sympathizers, organized by Abwehr infiltrators and armed by the SS, staged a diversionary uprising, firing from windows and killing 20 Polish troops of the 22nd Infantry Regiment. The 62nd infantry regiment of the 15th division was tasked with restoring order; Polish troops rounded up 600 local Germans and killed 100 others, some in combat and some in summary executions. The next day however, September 4, saw more sniping by local Germans, resulting in retaliation from the Polish troops which killed as many as 150 further fighters and civilians. This event was magnified by German propaganda into the “Bromberg Massacre”, falsely claiming that 5,000 Germans had been killed. On September 5 German troops entered the city, followed by the SS Einzatzgruppen 4 and SS-Standarte-Totenkopf division, which rounded up and killed 192 Poles, including city officials and other political figures, in the first week of the occupation. Prison camps were established in the area which held over 7,000 prisoners by November.

== Aftermath ==
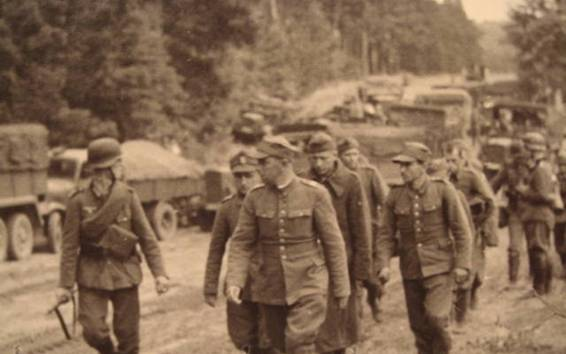
Polish prisoners of war escorted by German soldiers. Tuchola Forest. 1939.

By 5 September, the Germans had in large part completed their takeover of the Polish Corridor. At that point some German forces moved to erase isolated pockets of Polish resistance further north in fortified areas on the Baltic Coast, while others continued their push south-east, deeper into Polish territory.

On 6 September, Adolf Hitler visited Guderian and congratulated him on his swift progress.

About two-thirds of Armia Pomorze survived the battle, regrouped, and were reconstituted under Armia Poznań (Army Poznań) in time to fight in the Polish counteroffensive at the Battle of the Bzura.

Ultimately, Polish units, when dug-in and defending their chosen strongpoints, fought well and managed to inflict casualties on the German attackers, but the Polish troops were spread too thin, and coordination between units, even regiments of the same division, was very poor. German losses were fairly modest, with only 150 dead and 700 wounded in Guderian's XIX Panzer Corps, and several dozen tanks knocked out. German air power and mobility gave them a considerable technological advantage over the Polish forces, which struggled to keep pace with their opponents in a war of movement.

== Order of battle ==
=== Polish ===
Polish Army
	Groups	Division or Brigade	Regiment or Battalion
Army Pomorze Bortnowski	Operational Group Czersk Grzmot-Skotnicki	Pomorska Cavalry Brigade; Zakrzewski	2nd Chevau-légers Regiment; 8th Mounted Rifles Regiment; 16th Uhlan Regiment; 18th Uhlan Regiment
Army Pomorze Bortnowski	Operational Group Czersk Grzmot-Skotnicki	Chojnice Detachment; Majewski	1st Rifles Battalion; 18th Uhlan Regiment; Czersk Battalion; Tuchola Battalion
Army Pomorze Bortnowski	Operational Group Czersk Grzmot-Skotnicki	Kościerzyna Detachment; Staniszewski	Kościerzyna Battalion; Gdynia II Battalion; 62nd Infantry Regiment
Army Pomorze Bortnowski		9th Infantry Division; Werobej	15th Infantry Regiment; 22nd Infantry Regiment; 34th Infantry Regiment; 35th Infantry Regiment
Army Pomorze Bortnowski		27th Infantry Division; Drapella	23rd Infantry Division; 24th Infantry Division; 50th Infantry Division
Army Pomorze Bortnowski		15th Infantry Division; Przyjalkowski	59th Infantry Regiment; 61st Infantry Regiment; 62nd Infantry Regiment

=== German ===
Wehrmacht
	Corps	Division or Brigade	Regiments
4th Army Kluge	XIX Corps Guderian	3rd Panzer Division; Schweppenburg	5th Panzer Regiment; 6th Panzer Regiment; 3rd Motorized Infantry Regiment
4th Army Kluge	XIX Corps Guderian	2nd Motorized Division; Bader	5th Motorized Infantry Regiment; 25th Motorized Infantry Regiment; 92nd Motorized Infantry Regiment
4th Army Kluge	XIX Corps Guderian	20th Motorized Division; Wiktorin	69th Motorized Infantry Regiment; 76th Motorized Infantry Regiment; 80th Motorized Infantry Regiment
4th Army Kluge	II Corps Strauss	3rd Infantry Division; Lichel	8th Infantry Regiment; 29th Infantry Regiment; 50th Infantry Regiment
4th Army Kluge	II Corps Strauss	32nd Infantry Division; Böhme	4th Infantry Regiment; 94th Infantry Regiment; 96th Infantry Regiment
4th Army Kluge	III Corps Haase	50th Infantry Division; Sorsche	121st Infantry Regiment; 122nd Infantry Regiment; 123rd Infantry Regiment
4th Army Kluge	Wehrmacht Reserves	10th Panzer Division; Schaal	8th Panzer Regiment; 86th Motorized Infantry Regiment
4th Army Kluge	Wehrmacht Reserves	23rd Infantry Division; Brockdorff-Ahlefeldt	9th Infantry Regiment; 67th Infantry Regiment; 68th Infantry Regiment
4th Army Kluge	Wehrmacht Reserves	218th Infantry Division; Freiherr Grote	323rd Infantry Regiment; 386th Infantry Regiment; 397th Infantry Regiment

== See also ==
- List of World War II military equipment of Poland
- List of German military equipment of World War II
