= Charge at Krojanty =

WWII Polish invasion battle

Battle of Krojanty
- Part of the Invasion of Poland
Date	1 September 1939
Location	Near Krojanty, Pomeranian Voivodeship, Poland 53.7119°N 17.6536°E
Result	German victory

Belligerents
(Nazi Germany) Germany	(Second Polish Republic) Poland

Commanders and leaders
(Nazi Germany) Hans Gollnick; (Nazi Germany) Mauritz von Wiktorin	(Second Polish Republic) Kazimierz Mastalerz †

Units involved
76th Infantry Regiment	18th Pomeranian Uhlan Regiment; 1st & 2nd squadrons; 1 platoon of 3rd and 4th sq.

Strength
800 men; Armoured reconnaissance vehicle; 20 guns	250

Casualties and losses
11 killed; 9 wounded	19–25 killed; 40–50 wounded

The charge at Krojanty, battle of Krojanty, the riding of Krojanty or skirmish of Krojanty was a Polish cavalry charge on the evening of 1 September 1939, the first day of the Second World War, near the Pomeranian village of Krojanty. It occurred at the start of the invasion of Poland and was part of the larger Battle of Tuchola Forest. Polish soldiers advanced east along the railway to a railroad crossroads 7 kilometres (4.3 mi) from the town of Chojnice, where elements of the Polish cavalry charged and dispersed a German infantry battalion. Machine gun fire from German armoured cars that appeared from a nearby forest forced the Poles to retreat. However, the attack delayed the German advance, allowing the Polish 1st Rifle Battalion and Czersk Operational Group to withdraw safely.

The incident prompted false reports of Polish cavalry attacking German tanks, after journalists saw the bodies of horses and cavalrymen. Nazi propaganda took advantage to suggest that the Poles attacked intentionally since they had believed the Germans still had the dummy tanks permitted by the Versailles Treaty's restrictions. The scene of the Polish cavalry charging panzers with lances remains a common myth.

== Before the battle ==
Polish units were engaged in battle from 05:00 against elements of German 76th Infantry Regiment (Colonel Hans Gollnick) of 20th Motorised Division under Lt. Gen. Mauritz von Wiktorin, which operated on the left (northern) flank of XIX Army Corps under Gen. Heinz Guderian. Early in the day, Polish cavalry had intercepted German infantry moving towards the Free City of Danzig (Gdańsk) and slowed their progress.

At 08:00, the Germans broke through Polish Border Guard units south of the Polish cavalry, which forced the Polish units in the area to start a retreat towards a secondary defence line at the Brda river. The 18th Pomeranian Uhlan Regiment was ordered to cover the retreat.

== The battle ==
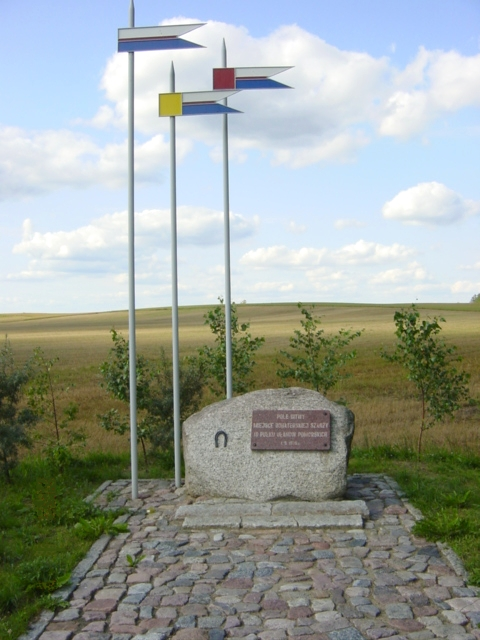
Monument at the battlefield

The 18th Pomeranian Uhlans spotted a group of German infantry resting in a clearing in the Tuchola Forest heath near the railroad crossroads of Chojnice–Runowo Pomorskie line.

Colonel Kazimierz Mastalerz decided to take the enemy by surprise and ordered Eugeniusz Świeściak, commander of the 1st squadron, to execute a cavalry charge at 1900 hours, leading two squadrons, about 250 strong. Most of the two other squadrons, and their TKS/TK3 tankettes, were held back in reserve.

The charge was successful: the German infantry unit was dispersed, and the Poles occupied the clearing. However, German armored reconnaissance vehicles appeared from the forest road, probably part of Aufklärungs-Abteilung 20, and soon the Polish units came under heavy machine gun fire, probably from Leichter Panzerspähwagen equipped with MG 34, or Schwerer Panzerspähwagen equipped also with a 20 mm gun. The Poles were completely exposed and began to gallop for cover behind a nearby hillock.

Commander Świeściak was killed, as was Mastalerz, who tried to save him. About a third of the Polish force was dead or wounded. On the other hand, the German advance was halted long enough to allow the withdrawal of Polish 1st Rifle battalion and National Defence battalion Czersk from the nearby battle of Chojnice.

The Polish cavalry charge impressed the Germans and caused a delay in the offensive of the German 20th Motorised Infantry Division which considered a tactical retreat. This was however prevented by personal intervention of Gen. Guderian, who in his memoirs stated that he encountered his staff "wearing helmets, preparing an anti-tank gun for a possible Polish cavalry attack," and that "the panic of the first day of war was overcome quickly".

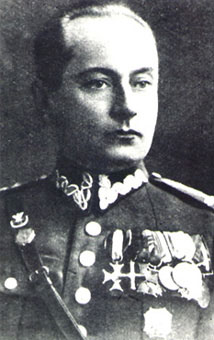
Kazimierz Mastalerz

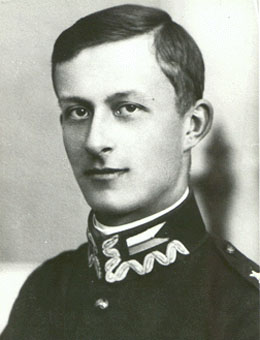
Eugeniusz Świeściak

== Aftermath and myth ==
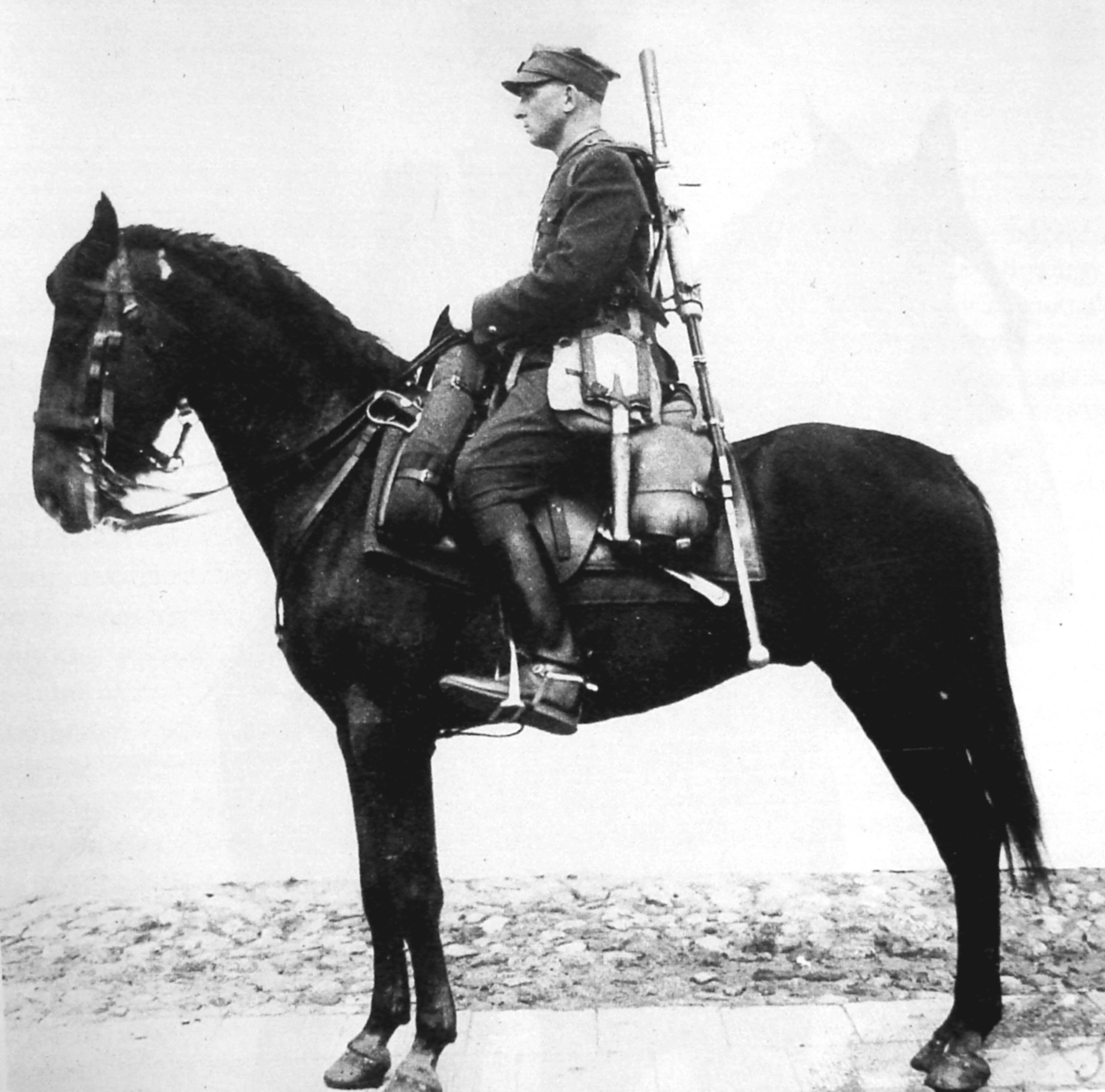
Polish uhlan with wz. 35 anti-tank rifle. Military instruction published in Warsaw in 1938.

The Polish cavalry charge stopped the German pursuit for the day, and the units of Czersk Operational Group were able to withdraw southwards unopposed. Also, it took the Germans several hours to reorganise and continue the advance. On 2 September 1939 the 18th Pomeranian Uhlans Regiment was decorated by General Stanisław Grzmot-Skotnicki, the commander of the Operational Group, with his own Virtuti Militari medal for valour shown in combat.

The same day, German war correspondents were brought to the battlefield, together with two journalists from Italy. They were shown the corpses of Polish cavalrymen and their horses as well as German tanks that had arrived after the battle. One of the Italian correspondents, Indro Montanelli, sent home an article in which he described the bravery and heroism of Polish soldiers, who charged German tanks with sabres and lances. Although such a charge did not happen, and there were no tanks used during combat, the myth was used in German propaganda during the war. German propaganda magazine Die Wehrmacht reported on 13 September that the Poles had gravely underestimated German weapons, as Polish propaganda had suggested that German armoured vehicles were covered only with sheet metal, which led to a grotesque attack.

One writer said:

Contrary to German propaganda, Polish cavalry brigades never charged tanks with their sabres or lances... The cavalry brigades were in the process of being reorganized into motorized brigades.

The Poles had anti-tank weapons, including the anti-tank rifle model 1935 7.92 mm (Wz. 35 anti-tank rifle). It could penetrate 15 mm of armour at 300 m at 30 degrees. In 1939, the Germans were equipped mainly with the small Panzer I and Panzer II models, which were vulnerable to such weapons.

== See also ==
- List of World War II military equipment of Poland
- List of German military equipment of World War II

== Bibliography ==
- Guderian, Heinz (1951), Erinnerungen eines Soldaten [Memoirs of a soldier] (in German) (2nd ed.), Welsermühl.
- Zaloga, Steven J (1982), The Polish Army 1939–45, Men-at-Arms, Osprey, ISBN 978-0-85045417-8, "small skirmish near the hamlet of Krojanty".
