= Pomeranian Army =

- Polish: Armia Pomorze
- Active: 23 March 1939 – 18 September 1939
- Country: Second Polish Republic
- Type: Field Army
- Engagements: World War II: Invasion of Poland; Battle of Tuchola Forest; Battle of Bzura

Commanders
- Notable commanders: Władysław Bortnowski

The Pomeranian Army (Polish: Armia Pomorze) was one of the Polish armies defending against the 1939 Invasion of Poland. It was officially created on 23 March 1939. Led by General dywizji Władysław Bortnowski, it consisted of 5 infantry divisions, 2 National Defence brigades and 1 cavalry brigade.

== Tasks ==
The Army was tasked to defend Toruń and Bydgoszcz from a possible German attack and to carry out delaying actions in the "Polish Corridor" area.

== Operational history ==
The Pomorze Army suffered severe losses during the Battle of Tuchola Forest; losing about a third of its strength. In retreat towards Warsaw from 6 September, it subordinated itself to Army Poznań and took part in the Battle of Bzura (9–20 September).

== Organization ==
The Army was commanded by General Władysław Bortnowski; his chief of staff was Colonel Ignacy Izdebski.

The composition of the Pomorze Army:

Unit	Polish name	Commander	Remarks
Army units - Gen. Władysław Bortnowski
9th Infantry Division	9 Dywizja Piechoty	Col. Józef Werobej
15th Infantry Division	15 Dywizja Piechoty	Gen. Wacław Przyjałkowski	Greater Polish
27th Infantry Division	27 Dywizja Piechoty	Gen.Bryg. Juliusz Drapella
Pomeranian National Defence Brigade	Pomorska Brygada Obrony Narodowej	Col. Tadeusz Majewski
Chełm National Defence Brigade	Chełmska Brygada Obrony Narodowej
Operational Group "East" - Gen. Mikołaj Bołtuć
4th Infantry Division	4 Dywizja Piechoty	Col. Rawicz-Mysłowski, Col. Józef Werobej
16th Infantry Division	16 Dywizja Piechoty	Col. Zygmunt Szyszko-Bohusz	Pomeranian
Operational Group "Czersk" - Gen.Bryg. Stanisław Grzmot-Skotnicki
Pomeranian Cavalry Brigade	Pomorska Brygada Kawalerii	Gen.Bryg. Stanisław Grzmot-Skotnicki
Independent Units Chojnice and Kościerzyna	Oddziały Wydzielone "Chojnice" i "Kościerzyna"

== Maps ==
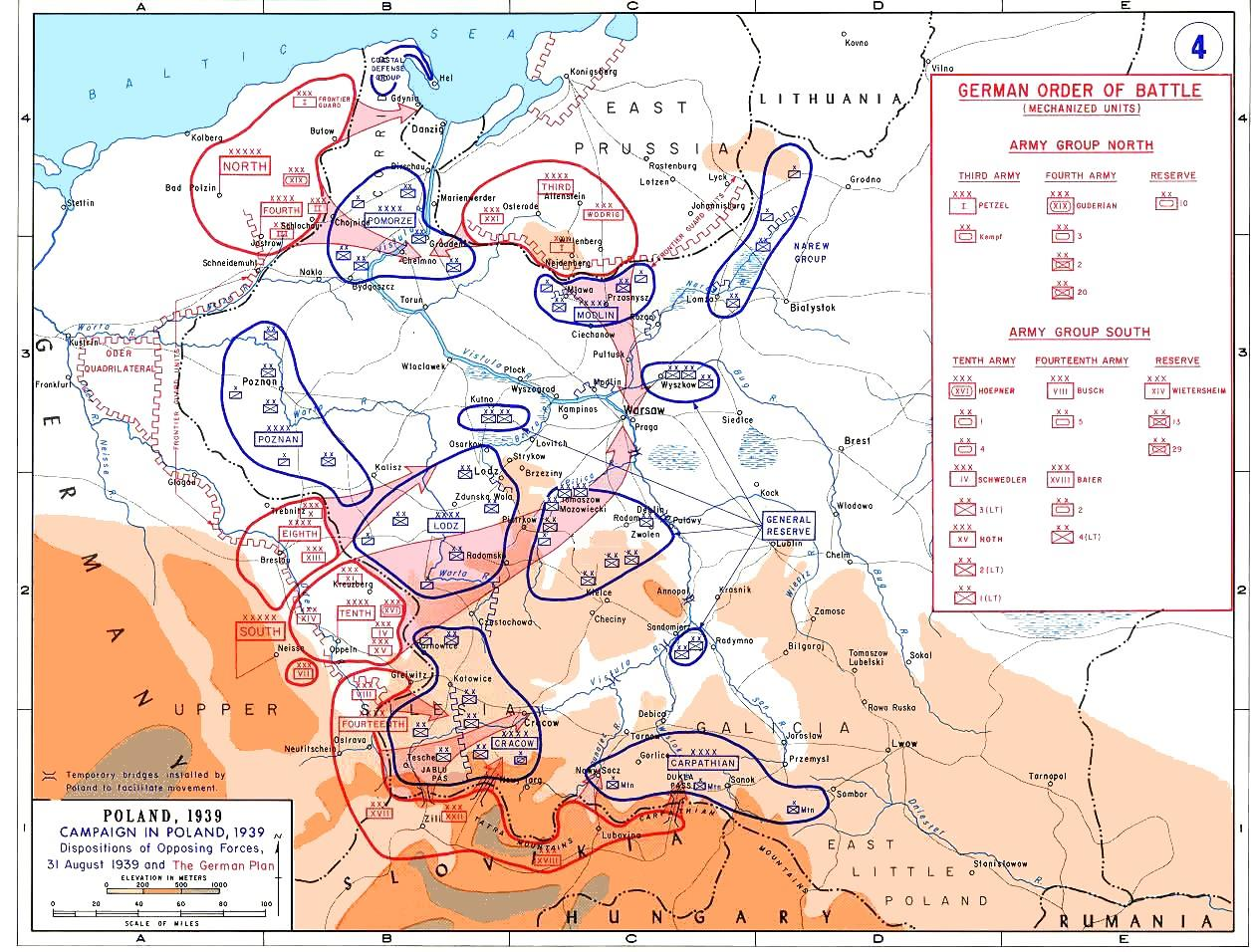
Forces as of 31 August and German plan of attack.

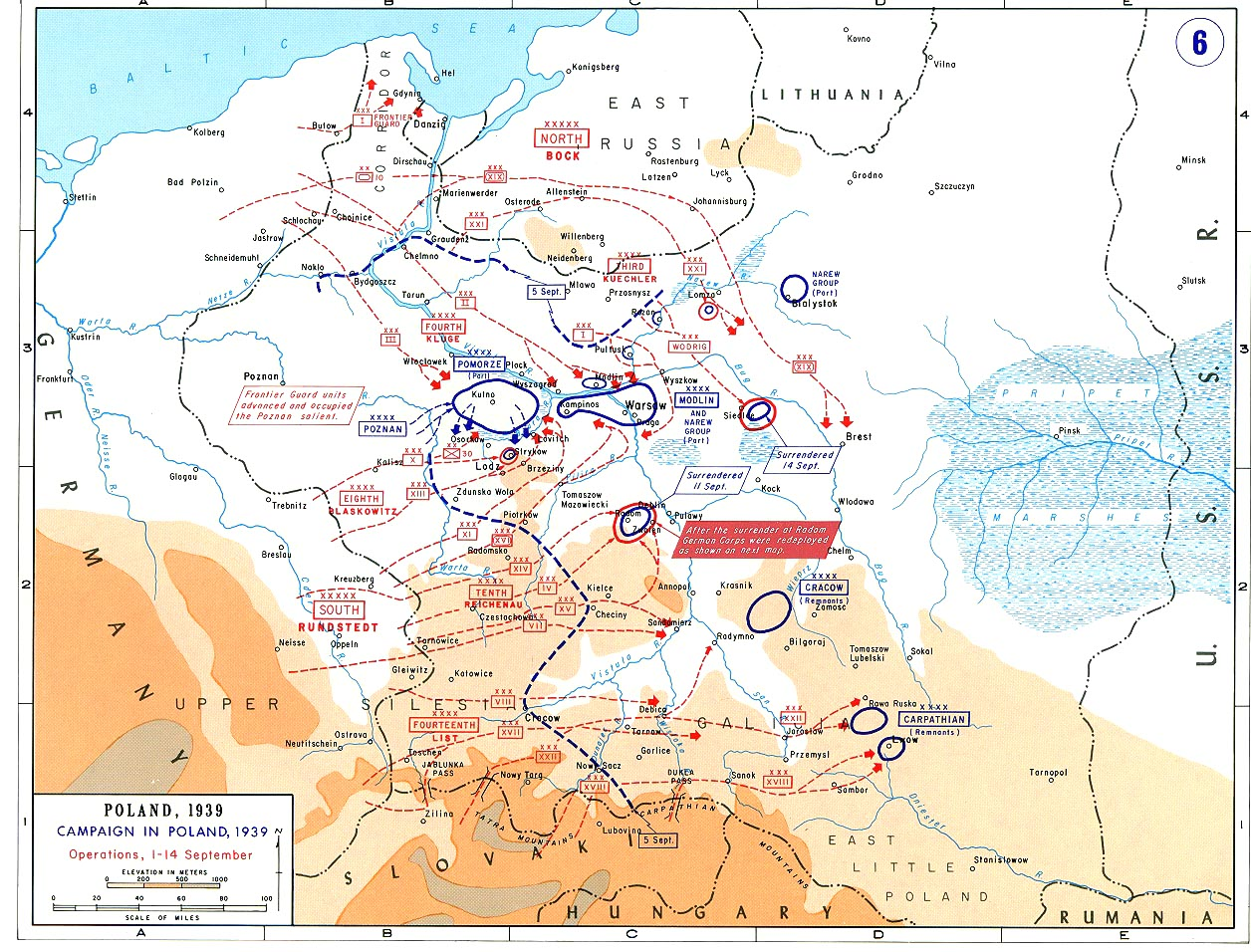
Forces as of 14 September with troop movements up to this date.

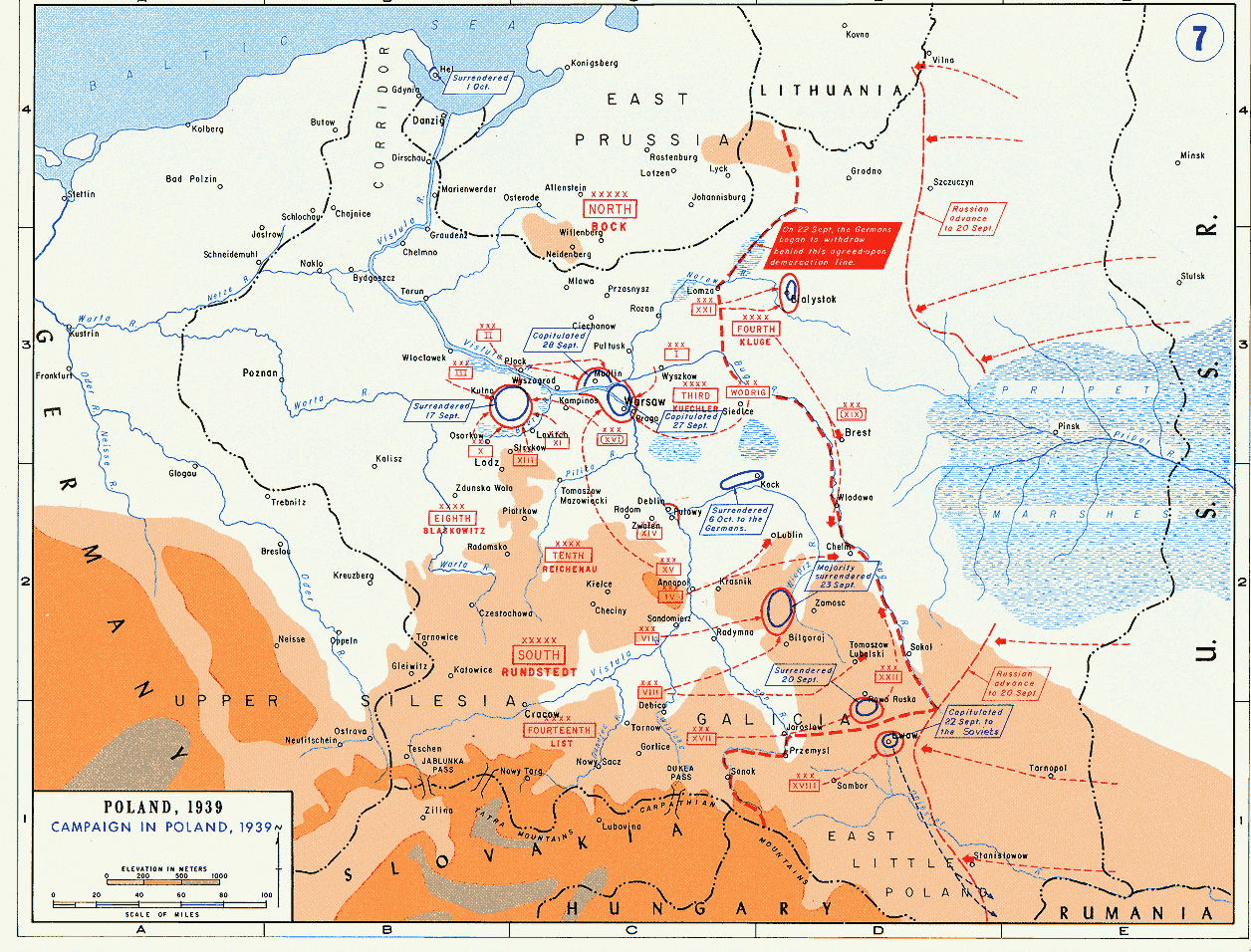
Forces after 14 September with troop movements after this date

== See also ==
- Polish army order of battle in 1939
