= Władysław Bortnowski =

Polish military commander (1891–1966)

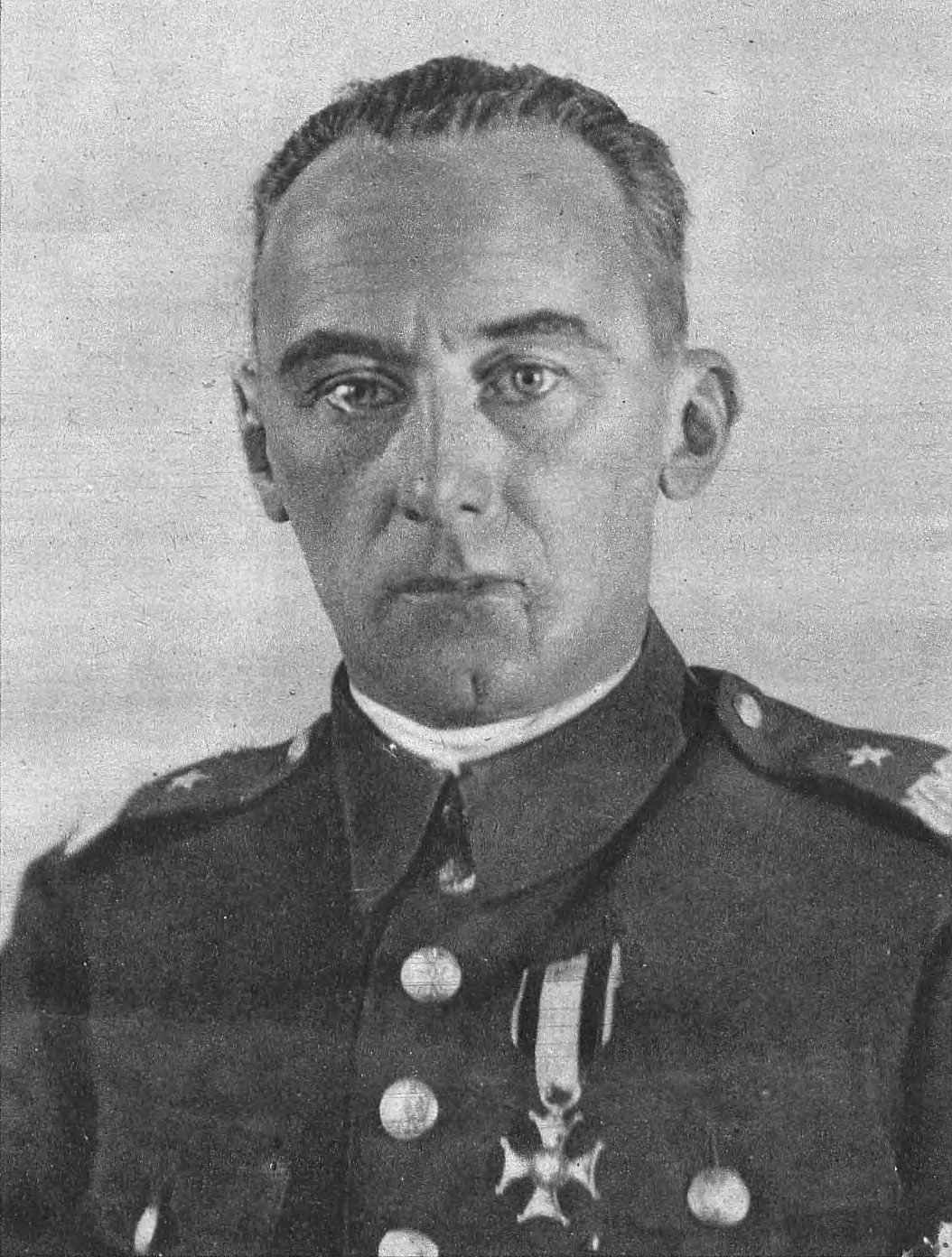
- Born: 12 November 1891; Radom, Russian Empire
- Died: 21 November 1966 (aged 75) Glen Cove, New York, U.S.
- Branch: Polish Army
- Service years: 1914–1945
- Rank: Major general
- Commands: Pomorze Army
- Conflicts: World War I; Polish–Ukrainian War; Polish–Bolshevik War; World War II; Battle of Tuchola Forest; Battle of the Bzura
- Awards: See awards and decorations

Władysław Bortnowski (12 November 1891 – 21 November 1966) was a Polish historian, military commander and one of the highest ranking generals of the Polish Army. He is most famous for commanding the Pomorze Army in the Battle of the Bzura during the Nazi invasion of Poland in 1939. He is also notable for serving as president of the Józef Piłsudski Institute of America between 1961 and 1962.

== Education and the Great War ==
Bortnowski was born on 12 November 1891 in Radom, Congress Poland, Russian Empire. Upon graduating from a gymnasium in Zhytomir, he enrolled into the Imperial Moscow University as a medical student, only to transfer after one year to the Jagiellonian University in Kraków. There, he completed his medical studies. From 1908, he was a member of the Union for Active Struggle, and from 1912, a member of the Riflemen's Association. In 1913, he completed his training as a NCO, followed by his graduation as an officer in the ranks of the Rifleman's Association. With the outbreak of the Great War, Bortnowski interrupted his higher studies and joined the Polish Legions where he commanded a platoon in the ranks of the 1st Infantry Regiment. Next, as a second lieutenant, he commanded a company in the 5th Infantry Regiment, followed by a position as adjutant of the 7th Infantry Regiment of the 1st Brigade. On Christmas Day 1914, Bortnowski was wounded at the battle of Łowczówek. Following the events of the Oath Crisis in 1917, he was arrested and interned at the Fort Beniaminów POW camp in Beniaminów from July 1917 until his release in April 1918. From his release from Beniaminów to October 1918, Bortnowski acted as commander of the Kraków branch of the Polish Military Organisation.

== Polish–Ukrainian War and Polish–Soviet War ==
On 31 October 1918, Lieutenant Colonel Bortnowski joined the Polish Army which was reborn after Poland had regained her independence at the conclusion of World War I. Initially, he led a company in the 5th Infantry Regiment, and was later promoted to lead a battalion of the 5th Infantry Regiment. In November 1918, he participated in both the Sieges of Przemyśl and Lwów. From May 1919, Bortnowski worked as a teaching assistant during the very first post-war sessions at the War School of the General Staff of the War College in Warsaw.

With the onset of the Polish–Soviet War, Bortnowski remained at his teaching position in Warsaw until December 1919. From 10 October 1919, he served as an operations officer of the Polish 1st Legions Infantry Division, composed mostly of his colleagues from the Polish Legions. Next, he served as Chief of the 3rd Operational Group Branch led by General Edward Rydz-Śmigły. Next, Bortnowski served as Chief of the 3rd Branch of the 3rd Army, and from October 1920, as chief of staff of the 3rd Army led by Zygmunt Zieliński.

== Interwar period ==
After the conclusion of the Polish–Soviet War, Bortnowski traveled to Paris, France, where he began training at the École Supérieure de Guerre on 1 November 1920. In September 1922, he graduated and returned to Poland where he received further training at various posts, notably in the staff of the Army Inspectorate in Wilno (modern Vilnius, Lithuania). On 15 August 1924, he was promoted to the rank of colonel and in October of the following year, he became the commanding officer of the Kutno-based 37th Infantry Regiment. After the May Coup d'État in 1926, he served as the Chief of the 3rd Branch of the General Army Staff for two months starting in November. In February 1928, he was appointed commander of the 26th Infantry Division in Skierniewice. From June 1930, he was transferred to Poznań where he was appointed commander of the 14th Infantry Division. In October 1930, was assigned to the Army Inspectorate in Toruń as an officer. On 1 November 1931, he took command of the Zamość-based 3rd Legions Infantry Division, one of the most prestigious units of the Polish Army.

On 1 January 1932, Bortnowski was promoted to the rank of brigadier general by President Ignacy Mościcki. Starting from 12 October 1935, he served as an Inspector General of the Armed Forces at Toruń. In the autumn of 1938, Bortnowski took command of the Independent Operational Group Silesia which took participation in the occupation of Czechoslovak territory resulting from the Munich Agreement. Specifically, Bortnowski's troops occupied the Czechoslovak territory of Trans-Olza. The popularity of Bortnowski after his successful invasion and occupation of Trans-Olza was so great back in Poland, that he was planned to replace Marshal Edward Rydz-Śmigły as commander-in-chief when the latter was to run for the presidency in the planned 1940 elections.

Prior to the outbreak of the September Campaign in September 1939, Bortnowski was promoted to the rank of division general on 1 March 1939, and became the commanding officer of Pomeranian Army, the northernmost of the Polish armies to take part in the war.

== September Campaign ==
During the September Campaign, also known as the Polish Defensive War, Bortnowski commanded the Pomeranian Army. Having been surrounded from two sides by Nazi German forces, the Pomeranian Army was forced to fight several bloody battles while retreating southwards towards Poznań and Warsaw, including the Battle of Tuchola Forest.

On 9 September, Bortnowski subordinated the Pomeranian Army under the Poznań Army led by General Tadeusz Kutrzeba. Next, the combined forces of the Pomeranian and Poznań Armies took part in the Battle of the Bzura, a counter-offensive devised by Kutrzeba. Bortnowski's forces were most notable for fighting near the outskirts of Łowicz and Sochaczew.

On 14 September, he was ordered to retreat onto the northern side of the Bzura River which resulted in the definite retreat of both the Pomeranian and Poznań Armies towards Warsaw. On 21 September, Borntowski was captured by German forces and held as a prisoner-of-war.

== German captivity and post-war life ==
Bortnowski spent the rest of World War II in various Nazi prisoner-of-war camps, such as Oflag IV-B Koenigstein, Oflag VIII-E Johannisbrunn and finally Oflag VII-A Murnau. Liberated in 1945 by American forces, he remained in exile after the war. Initially in Great Britain, where he was one of the founders of the Józef Piłsudski Institute in London, he eventually emigrated to the United States in 1954. He is most commonly associated with the Polish Independence League and the Józef Piłsudski Institute of America. He served on the institute's committee from 30 November 1954. From 19 June 1955, he served as the institute's vice-president, and he was appointed President of the Institute in 1961 and served until 1962. He died on 21 November 1966, in Glen Cove, New York. His funeral took place five days later on 26 November, where he was laid to rest at the Our Lady of Czestochowa Cemetery in Doylestown, Pennsylvania.

== Controversy ==
Prior to his death on 22 September, General Mikołaj Bołtuć, an officer serving in Bortnowski's Pomeranian Army, allegedly criticized Bortnowski's leadership during the September Campaign. He supposedly regretted that he had not "during the first days of the war – during the Battle of Tuchola Forest, put a bullet through his (Bortnowski's) head and assumed command". Additionally, he allegedly stated that "if I die, let it be known that the Army and I died because of this son-of-a-bitch".

The above-mentioned statements made by General Bołtuć were publicised by General Wiktor Thommée. On the other hand, Bołtuć's statements regarding Bortnowski and his leadership during September 1939 were contrary to the general opinion of the other officers who had served under Bortnowski's command in the Pomeranian Army.

General Bołtuć, who was remembered positively by Bortnowski himself, was supposedly hot-tempered in both word and action. During the September Campaign, Bołtuć dismissed both commanders of the two divisions that were part of his Operational Group. It is alleged that as a result of the bombardment during the Battle of the Bzura, as well as the break-through towards the Modlin Fortress, Bołtuć may have suffered from a nervous breakdown. Bołtuć attributed to Bortnowski the series of disastrous events of September 1939 that eventually resulted in Nazi Germany's and the Soviet Union's occupation of Poland. Specifically, Bołtuć criticized the "absurd" deployment of three large Polish Army units: the Pomeranian Cavalry Brigade, the 9th Infantry Division and the 27th Infantry Division into the Polish Corridor, which would allow Germany forces to cut Poland off from access to the Baltic Sea. Bołtuć was correct since General Günther von Kluge's 4th Army quickly exploited the tactical error. Kluge and his 4th Army captured the Corridor by smashing through the three Polish units and cut off the rest of Poland from the Baltic coast, where several Polish coastal defense units remained and were forced to defend alone, which resulted in the notable Battle of Hel.

On the other hand, General Bortnowski had known of the tactical absurdity and had unsuccessfully appealed several times to his superiors prior to the invasion. Bołtuć's reaction and criticisms may be justified through the Clausewitzian philosophy in which the commander of a losing army holds the heaviest burden for the loss since he holds full responsibility for his army. With that interpretation, Bołtuć's criticisms of Bortnowski are justified in that Bortnowski was the commanding officer of the Pomeranian Army.

== Promotions ==
- Podporucznik (Second lieutenant) - 1914
- Porucznik (First lieutenant) - 1916
- Kapitan (Captain) - 1918
- Podpułkownik (Lieutenant colonel) - 1920
- Pułkownik (Colonel) - 15 August 1924
- Generał brygady (Brigadier general) - 1932
- Generał dywizji (Major general) - 16 March 1939

== Awards and decorations ==
Among the military decorations he received are:

- Silver Cross of Virtuti Militari (1921)
- Commander's Cross with Star of the Polonia Restituta (10 November 1938)
- Cross of Independence (20 January 1931)
- Officer's Cross of the Polonia Restituta (7 November 1925)
- Cross of Valour (4 times)
- Golden Gold Cross of Merit (17 March 1930)
- Cross of Merit of the Army of Central Lithuania (1926)
- Commemorative Medal for the War of 1918–1921
- Medal of the Tenth Anniversary of Regained Independence
- Honorary Badge of Airborne and Antigas Defence League
- Order of Lāčplēsis, 3rd Class Order Number 1904 (Latvia)
- Medal of the 10th Anniversary of the War of Independence (Latvia)
- Commander of the Legion of Honour (France)
- Commander of Order of the Star of Romania (Romania)
- Officer of Order of Leopold (Belgium)

== Bibliography ==
- Konrad Ciechanowski, Armia "Pomorze" 1939, Warszawa, 1983. (in Polish)
- Jerzy Kirchmayer: Pamiętniki, Warszawa, 1987. (in Polish)
- Tadeusz Kryska-Karski i Stanisław Żurakowski, Generałowie Polski Niepodległej, Warszawa, 1991. (in Polish)
- Kazimierz Pindel, Obrona Narodowa 1937–1939, Warszawa, 1979. (in Polish)
- Piotr Stawecki, Słownik biograficzny generałów Wojska Polskiego 1918–1939, Warszawa 1994. (in Polish)
- General Władysław Bortnowskiego Archive in the collections of the Józef Piłsudski Institute of America (in Polish)
