= Polish 9th Infantry Division (disambiguation) =

Polish 9th Infantry Division may refer to:

- 9th Infantry Division (Poland) (1920-1939)
- Polish 9th Infantry Division (Armia Krajowa) of Armia Krajowa (9 Podlaska Dywizja Piechoty AK)
- Polish 9th Infantry Division (1942), formed and disbanded in 1942 as part of the Anders Army
