= Czersk Operational Group =

Military unit of the Polish Army

Czersk Operational Group (Polish: Grupa Operacyjna Czersk, otherwise known as Shielding Group Czersk; named after the town of Czersk, Poland) was an Operational Group (a type of tactical military unit) of the Polish Army. Formed in 1939 under the name of Tuchola Detachment (Polish: Zgrupowanie Tuchola) as part of the Intervention Corps created in order to counter a possible German action in the Free City of Danzig, it was not disbanded after the end of the Danzig Crisis. Instead it was pressed into the newly formed Pomorze Army of Gen. Władysław Bortnowski and took part in the fights against the German and Soviet Invasion of Poland later that year.

Commanded by Gen. Stanisław Grzmot-Skotnicki, it was composed of one cavalry brigade and one brigade-strong reserve infantry detachment, as well as numerous smaller units. In total, the unit had a force equivalent to one and a half divisions. Along with the rest of the army it took part in the early stages of the war, notably in the Battle of Tuchola Forest.

== OOB ==
- Pomorska Cavalry Brigade
  - Headquarters
  - 8th Mounted Rifles Regiment
  - 16th Greater Poland Uhlan Regiment
  - 11th Mounted Artillery Battalion (1st battery)
  - 81st Armoured Battalion (9 wz. 34 armoured cars and 13 TKS tankettes)
- Kościerzyna Detachment (Polish: Oddział Wydzielony Kościerzyna)
  - Kościerzyna Battalion of National Defence
  - Gdynia II Battalion of National Defence (detached from Kartuzy Detachment on September 1, 1939)
  - 11th Mounted Artillery Battalion (3rd battery)
- Chojnice Detachment
  - 1st Rifles Battalion
  - Czersk Battalion of National Defence
  - Tuchola Battalion of National Defence
  - Border Protection Corps engineering company Hoszcza
  - 11th Mounted Artillery Battalion (2nd battery)
  - 1st Battalion of the 9th Light Artillery Regiment (detached from 9th Infantry Division)
