= Pomeranian Cavalry Brigade =

Cavalry unit of the Polish Army

Pomeranian Cavalry Brigade (Polish: Pomorska Brygada Kawalerii) was a cavalry unit of the Polish Army in the interbellum period. It was created on April 1, 1937 out of the Cavalry Brigade "Bydgoszcz". Its headquarters were stationed in Bydgoszcz and the brigade consisted of these units:

- 2nd Rokitno Chevau-légers Regiment, garrisoned in Starogard,
- 16th Greater Poland Uhlan Regiment of General Gustaw Orlicz-Dreszer, stationed in Bydgoszcz,
- 18th Pomeranian Uhlan Regiment, stationed in Grudziądz,
- 8th Mounted Rifles Regiment, stationed in Chełmno,
- 11th Mounted Artillery Regiment, stationed in Bydgoszcz,
- 10th Pioneers Squadron, stationed in Bydgoszcz,
- 8th Communications Squadron, stationed in Bydgoszcz.

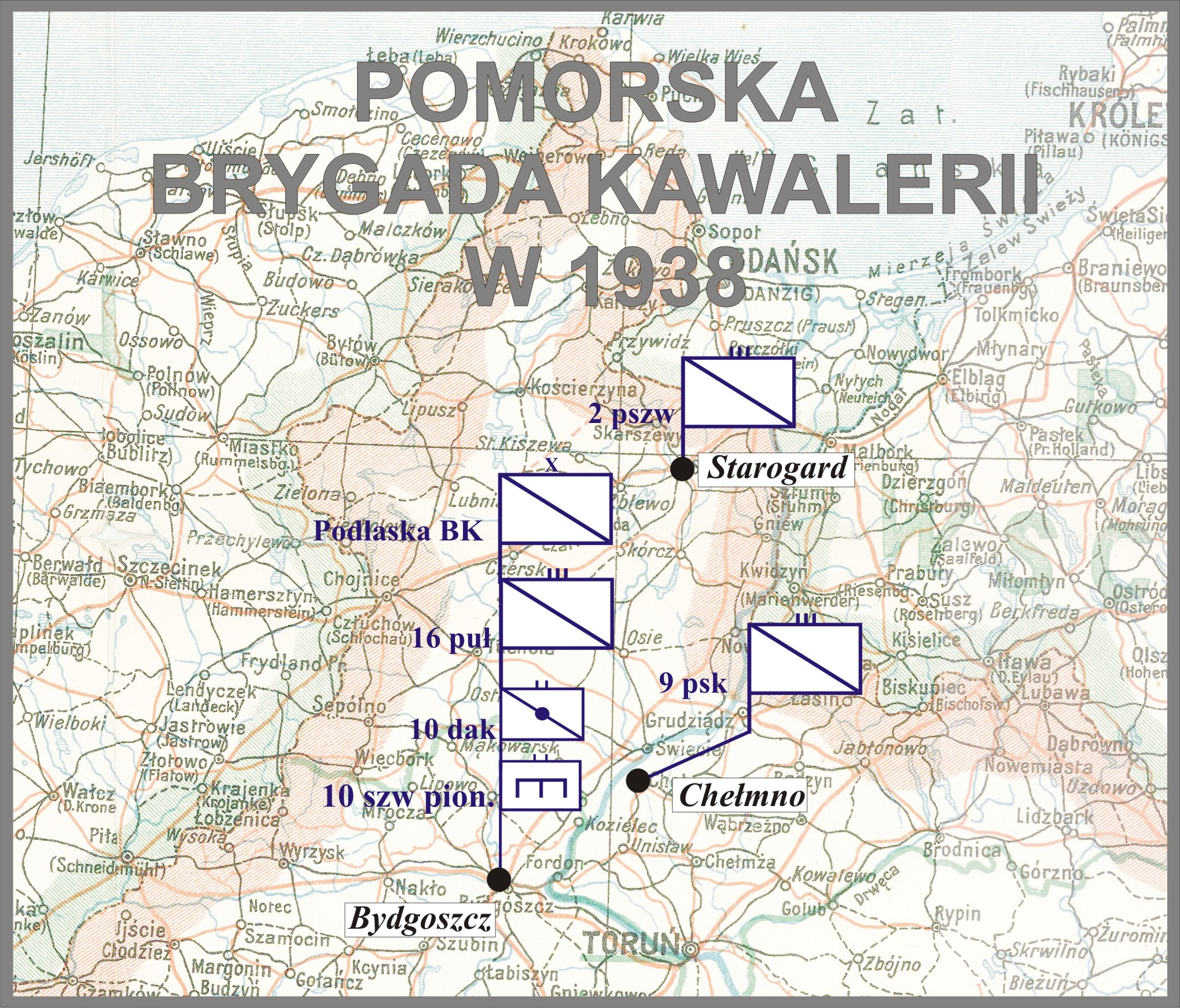
Pomorska BK w 1938

== Polish September Campaign ==
The brigade, under Colonel Adam Zakrzewski, was part of the Pomorze Army. On September 1, 1939, parts of the 18th Regiment of Pomeranian Uhlans made the legendary charge at Krojanty, during which unit's commandant, Colonel Kazimierz Mastalerz was killed. On September 2, the brigade was ordered to attack the town of Koronowo, which was defended by the German 3rd Armored Division of General Leo Geyr von Schweppenburg. This move was necessary, as it would help the withdrawing 9th Infantry Division, which had been engaged in bitter fighting. The cavalrymen, with heavy losses, managed to halt the Germans. However, at Bukowiec the Wehrmacht forces destroyed the 16th Regiment of Greater Poland Uhlans, soon afterwards the 18th Regiment of Pomeranian Uhlans shared same fate. The remaining forces managed to withdraw from the Tuchola Forest and on September 5, became part of the Operational Group of General Juliusz Drapella. After a few days, these units, together with Podolska Cavalry Brigade, took part in the Battle of Bzura. Then they managed to break to the Kampinos Forest, where, together with Podolska Cavalry Brigade and Wielkopolska Cavalry Brigade they created the Joint Cavalry Brigade of General Roman Abraham. On September 20, these forces broke into besieged Warsaw, where they capitulated together with the city, on September 28, 1939.

== See also ==
- Polish army order of battle in 1939
- Polish contribution to World War II
