= Leon Malhomme =

Polish diplomat (1881–1940)

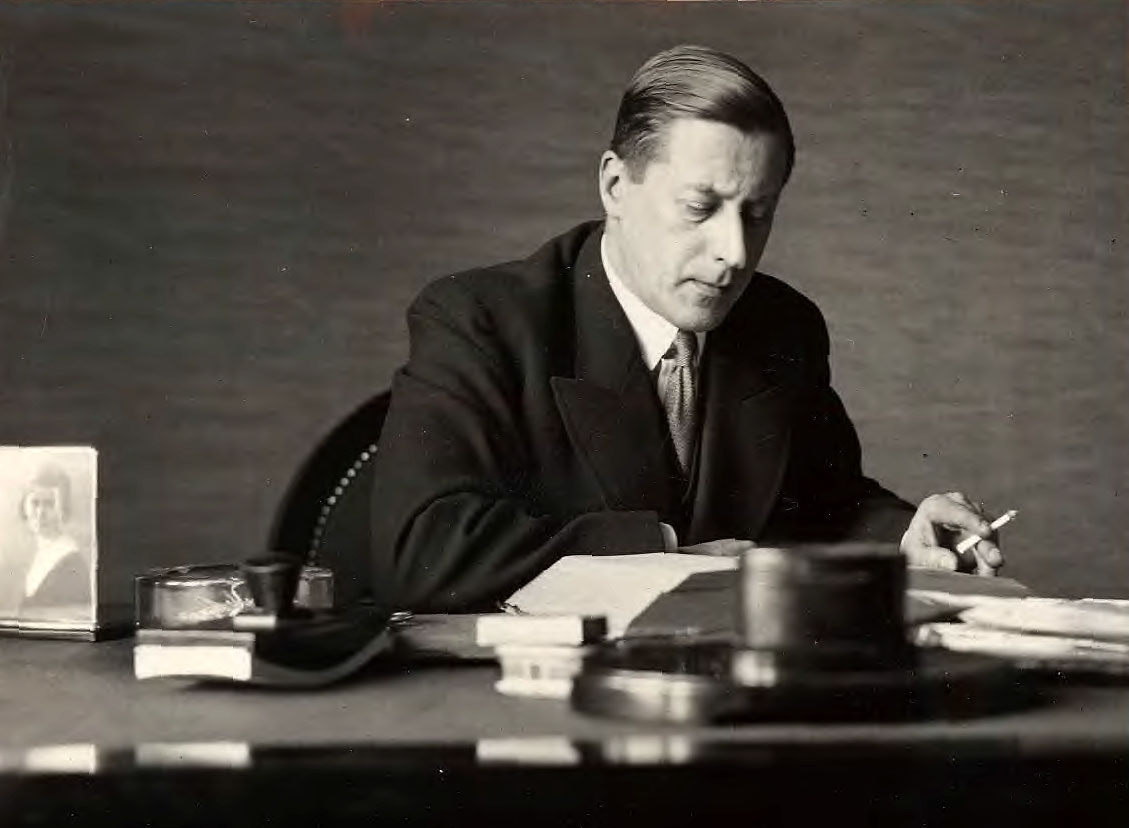
Leon Malhomme in 1932

Leon Malhomme (5 January 1881 in Saint Petersburg - 1940 in the Soviet Union) was a Polish interwar diplomat.

He worked as a Consul General of the Polish Republic in Germany - in Beuthen (1929–1931) and Oppeln (1931–1933), and as a Consul in Czechoslovakia - in Ostrava (1934–1935). During his tenure in Ostrava he encouraged the Polish minority to oppose the Czechoslovak government. Following the pressure from Czechoslovak government, he was recalled from the consulate.

After returning to Poland he became a vice-voivode of Silesian Voivodeship.

Malhomme was arrested on 23 September 1939 by NKVD, transported to the Soviet Union and executed.
