= Stanisław Grzmot-Skotnicki =

Polish general

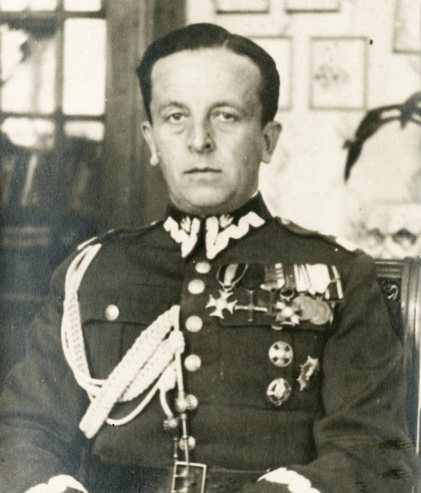
- Born: 13 January 1894; Skotniki, Congress Poland, Russian Empire
- Died: 19 September 1939 (aged 45); Tułowice, Poland
- Military career
- Allegiance: Poland
- Branch: (Poland) Polish Army
- Service years: 1914–1939
- Rank: Major General
- Conflicts: Great War; Polish–Ukrainian War; Polish–Bolshevik War; Invasion of Poland
- Awards: Virtuti Militari Silver Cross Commander's Cross of Polonia Restituta Cross of Independence Golden Cross of Merit Cross of the Valorous

Stanisław Grzmot-Skotnicki ([staˈniswaf ˈɡʐmɔt skɔtˈnit͡ski]; 13 January 1894 – 19 September 1939) was a Polish military commander and a general of the Polish Army. During the invasion of Poland of 1939 he commanded the Czersk Operational Group and was among the highest ranking Polish officers to be killed in action in that war.

Stanisław Skotnicki was born on 13 January 1894 in the village of Skotniki (being the root of his surname which literally means of Skotniki), to a family of Polish nobility (bearing the coat-of-arms of Clan Bogoria of which the lords of Skotniki are among the most ancient and prominent branches). After graduating from Seven-Class Municipal Trade School in Radom in 1912, he began studies at the Academy of Commerce in Sankt Gallen, Switzerland. There he joined the Związek Strzelecki and started organizing military training for the Polish emigrees and students as a commander of the association's branch. It was then he adopted his nom de guerre of Grzmot (Polish language for thunder), which later formed a part of his surname.

== First World War ==
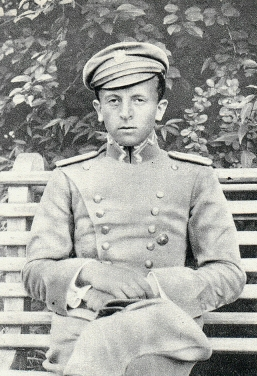
Grzmot-Skotnicki in the 1st Regiment of Polish Legions Uhlans

Upon the outbreak of the Great War he returned to Poland, to Austro-Hungarian Galicia, where he volunteered for the service in the Polish Legions. In August 1914 he became the member of The Seven Lancers of Belina under Władysław Belina-Prażmowski, the first detachment of the Polish Cavalry to cross the border with Privislinsky Krai. On the evening of August 3, he returned to Kraków, and on August 6, he set off with the First Cadre Company for Congress Poland. On October 9, 1914, he was promoted to second lieutenant and took the position of adjutant to Belina-Prażmowski.

He served in the cavalry regiment of the Legions, in which he commanded a platoon and then a squadron. During February and March 1917, he lectured on drills at the cavalry officer course in Ostrołęka. In the Oath Crisis, unwilling to leave his soldiers, he initially concealed his rank and was interned in Szczypiorno. After being exposed, he was imprisoned by the Germans in Havelberg, Rastatt, and Werl. He was released on October 14, 1918, and returned to Poland.

== Interbellum ==
Promotion

- 9 October 1914 Second Lieutenant
- 5 March 1915 Lieutenant
- 17 December 1918 Captain
- 1 April 1920 Lieutenant Colonel
- 31 March 1924 Colonel
- 24 December 1929 Brigadier General

After Poland regained her independence in November 1918, Stanisław Grzmot-Skotnicki took part in re-creation of his cavalry regiment, which later adopted the name of 1st Regiment of Light Cavalry of Józef Piłsudski (1. pułk szwoleżerów im. marszałka Józefa Piłsudskiego). On December 17, 1918, he officially joined the Polish Army with a promotion to captain by general Śmigły-Rydz. As the deputy commander of the 1st Light Cavalry Regiment he took part in the Polish-Ukrainian War, after which he was sent to the newly created School of Cavalry Officers in Warsaw, and then to the Application School of Cavalry in Saumur in France.

Upon his return, in August 1920 he became the commanding officer of the 8th Cavalry Brigade and then the entire 2nd Cavalry Division on the fronts of the Polish-Soviet War. On September 17, before entering Klevan, facing the danger of the brigade being cut off from its rear by the Bolsheviks, Grzmot-Skotnicki crossed the Stubla River with his brigade, captured the city, and defended it despite being outnumbered. This made his unit the front row of the counterattack in the Battle of Klevan. For his courage, he was awarded the Virtuti Militari Order, Class V. Later he also took part in the defence of Budyonny's forces at Równo and Horyń, in the Battle of Korets and Baranowicze.

From May to July 1921 he attended the Higher Commanders' Course in Warsaw. After the war he became the head instructor at the Centre for Cavalry Training in Grudziądz. Later that year, he was reprimanded by the Officers’ Court of Honour of the DOK VIII for a dispute with officers of the Central Cavalry School, who were speaking German in a public venue. Between 1924 and 1927 he was the commander of the prestigious 15th Uhlan Regiment in Poznań.

During the May Coup of 1926, his regiment was also ordered by the government to participate in the fight around Warsaw, which when found was commanded by his deputy, Major Albert Traeger. Skotnicki was told that he was under arrest as "a legionnaire cannot be entrusted when the regiment was marching against Piłsudski." He rebuked and gave his word of honour before taking command and set out for Warsaw, however arriving too late to participate in any battle. In Romeyko's account, Piłsudski had him report to him, cursed him out for being a greenhorn––yet according to Skotnicki's son, the Marshal simply wagged his finger at his father and said: "Oh, Grzmocik, Grzmocik." Nevertheless, Skotnicki's military career continued without interruption. After the coup, he was a member of the Commission for the Liquidation of the May Events, headed by General Żeligowski, which investigated military operations during the Coup.

Since 1927 he commanded the 9th Independent Cavalry Brigade, which was the later Baranowicze cavalry brigade of the Border Defence Corps after the reorganisation of Polish Cavalry in 1932.

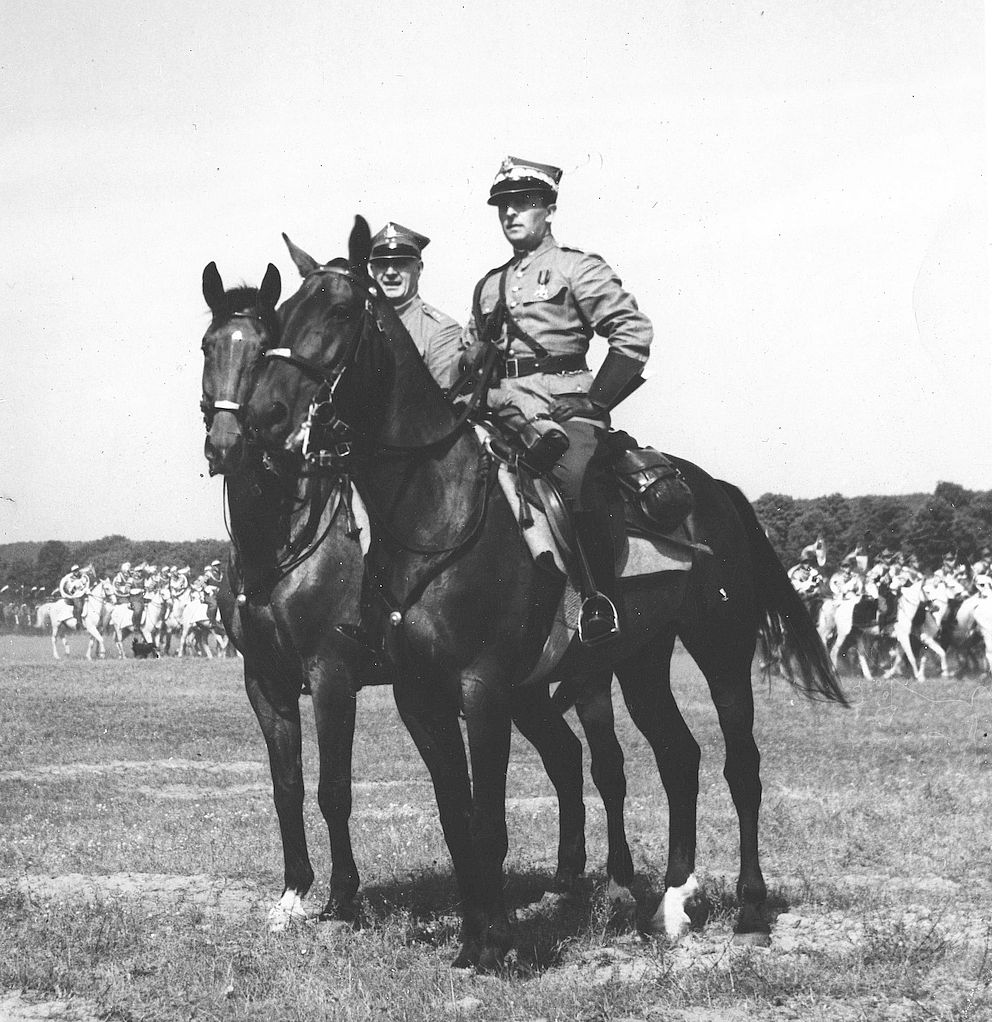
Stanisław Grzmot-Skotnicki during the parade, 1938.

In 1930–1931, Grzmot-Skotnicki was involved in a formal dispute with Colonel Jan Rozwadowski, commander of the 3rd Mounted Rifle Regiment, after Rozwadowski refused to cooperate with the pro-government Military Family (Rodzina Wojskowa) organisation and declined to comply with Skotnicki’s written demand for an explanation. Rozwadowski subsequently attempted to bypass his immediate superiors by seeking a personal audience with the General Inspector of the Armed Forces, which senior commanders judged to be contrary to service regulations and resolved the problem by transferring Rozwadowski. In 1933, he was involved in both military and personal disputes with artillery officer Jan Chmurowicz, who complained of difficulties in professional cooperation during planning and exercises in the Baranowicze area.

Since 1937 he served as the commander of the Pomeranian Cavalry Brigade. In 1938, together with the Brigade, he took part in the action in acquisition of Zaolzie.

== Second World War ==
At the start of the invasion of Poland in 1939, he commanded his unit as the core of the Czersk Operational Group which was to shield the Vistula river crossings against the German offensive and to protect the flanks of the Pomorze Army. After that unit's defeat in the battle of Tuchola Forest, he withdrew with the remnants of his unit to the south. During the Battle of the Bzura River he commanded a Cavalry Operational Group under his name, with which he headed for Warsaw after the Polish defeat in the battle.

On 18 September 1939, he ordered the brigade’s march under Colonel Jastrzębski while supervising the crossing of the Bzura by the remaining infantry elements. That evening, about 500 infantrymen formed a breakout group, successfully crossing the river and advancing toward the Kampinos Forest after overcoming weak German resistance. He was heavily wounded by German machine gun shots in the chest and stomach in the village of Tułowice and died of his wounds the following day. Initially buried on the spot, in 1952 his body was exhumed and moved to Warsaw's Powązki Military Cemetery.

== Assessment ==
Contemporary inspection reports from 1928 to 1938 consistently described Grzmot-Skotnicki as an energetic and ambitious cavalry commander with strong leadership qualities, initiative, and a marked talent for training officers and units. Inspectors praised his intelligence, decisiveness, horsemanship, and ability to impose discipline and cohesion, while also noting a tendency toward self-confidence bordering on arrogance and a focus on cavalry at the expense of systematic combined-arms cooperation, particularly with artillery. Although regarded as a promising candidate for higher command, several evaluators observed that he had limited opportunities to demonstrate his abilities in large-scale field command, and his performance in formal tactical exercises was assessed as mixed.

== Private Life ==
Stanisław Grzmot-Skotnicki was married twice. In 1919, he married Stefania née Calvas, divorced from Bolesław Wieniawa-Długoszowski. They had two children: Stanisław, born in 1920, and Stefania, a year younger. After Stefania's death in 1934, Stanisław's second wife was Maria née Karczewska.

He devoted most of his free time to social activities. He was president of the Baranowicze District Board of the Polish Educational Society and the Eastern Borderlands Riding Club. From 1928 to 1938, he frequently worked in the Executive Committee for Church Construction in Baranowicze, and as president from 1931 to 1934.

== Awards ==
- Virtuti Militari, Golden Cross (posthumously, 1970); previously awarded the Silver Cross
- Polonia Restituta, Commander's Cross; previously awarded the Officer's Cross
- Cross of Independence
- Cross of Merit, Golden)
- Cross of Valour 4x times
- Commemorative Medal for the War of 1918–1921
- Medal of the Tenth Anniversary of Regained Independence
- Commemorative Badge of the First Cadre
- Légion d'honneur, Commander's Cross (France); previously awarded the Knight's Cross
- Order of the Cross of the Eagle, Class II (Estonia, 1936)
- Commemorative Medal 1918-1928 (Latvia)

== Commemoration ==
In Tułowice, just off road 705, there is a small stone with a cavalry pennant – a memento of the general's last battle and the 42 soldiers taken prisoner, as well as six Tułowice residents, listed by name, who were executed by the Germans. Memorabilia of the general, including his uniform shoulder board, the Virtuti Militari order, and a medallion, are in the collections of the Museum of the Sochaczew Region and the Bzura Battlefield in Sochaczew.

By decision no. 77/MON of 4 August 1994, the Minister of National Defence named the 7th Mechanised Brigade (currently the 7th Pomeranian Coastal Defence Brigade) in Słupsk after Brigadier General Stanisław Grzmot-Skotnicki.

On the anniversary of his death in 2025, a new tombstone monument for General Stanisław Grzmot-Skotnicki was unveiled at the Powązki Military Cemetery, funded by the Institute of National Remembrance (IPN). The ceremony was attended by IPN Deputy President Karol Polejowski, who described Grzmot-Skotnicki as a worthy role model of patriotic service in modern Poland.
