= Mauritz von Wiktorin =

Austrian WWII general

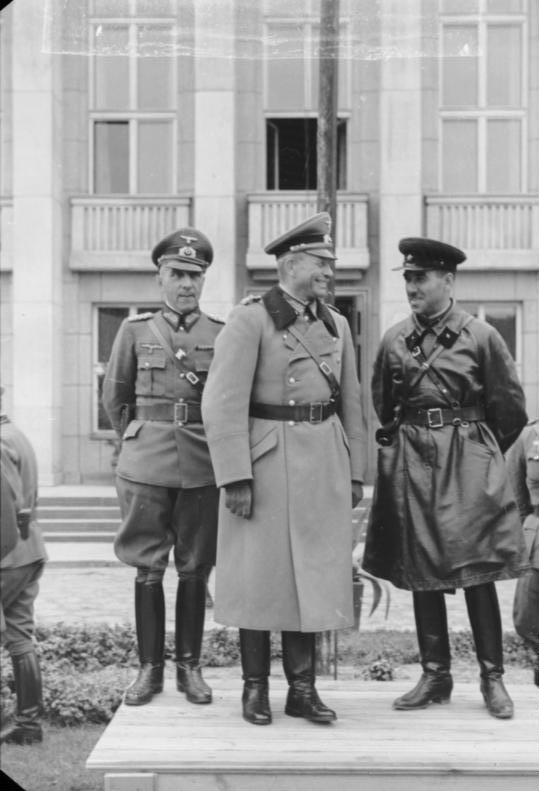
- Wiktorin (left), General Heinz Guderian (center) and Semyon Krivoshein at the German–Soviet military parade in Brest-Litovsk in 1939
- Born: 13 August 1883; Hainburg an der Donau, Cisleithania, Austria-Hungary
- Died: 16 August 1956 (aged 73); Nuremberg, West Germany
- Military career
- Allegiance: Austria-Hungary; First Austrian Republic; Nazi Germany
- Branch: German Army
- Service years: 1904–1935; 1938–1944
- Rank: General der Infanterie
- Commands: 20th Infantry Division; XXVIII Army Corps
- Conflicts: World War I; World War II; Invasion of Poland; Battle of Tuchola Forest; Charge at Krojanty; Battle of Belgium; Battle of France; Operation Barbarossa; Siege of Leningrad
- Awards: Knight's Cross of the Iron Cross

Mauritz von Wiktorin (13 August 1883 – 16 August 1956) was an Austrian general in the Wehrmacht during World War II. He was a recipient of the Knight's Cross of the Iron Cross of Nazi Germany. Wiktorin was discharged from the army on 30 November 1944 after the 20 July Plot.

== Military career ==
Wiktorin served as an officer in the Austro-Hungarian army in the First World War. After the war, he transferred to the postwar Austrian army and served as a commander and general staff officer in various units. During his service in the Austrian General Staff, he was arrested and dismissed from the army in 1935 for unauthorized contacts with German authorities.

Wiktorin was enthusiastic about the annexation of Austria. After the annexation, he was recalled into service and promoted to lieutenant-general of the army. In July 1938, he took command of the 20th Infantry Division. Wiktorin commanded the 20th in the invasion of Poland and attended the German–Soviet military parade in Brest-Litovsk with Heinz Guderian. In May 1940, the 20th Infantry Division took part in the invasion of France.

On 28 November 1940 Wiktorin took over as Commanding General of the XXVIII. Army Corps. He commanded the Corps in Operation Barbarossa, the invasion of the Soviet Union. As part of Army Group North Wiktorin's corps advanced through the Baltic states and was part of the forces that besieged Leningrad. In April 1942 before the main German summer offensive that year, he was replaced and transferred to the Führerreserve. From May 1942 he was head of the military district XIII based in Nuremberg, but was replaced by Karl Weisenberger in November 1944 after the assassination attempt on Hitler in the summer of 1944.

Wiktorin died on 16 August 1956 in Nuremberg.

== Awards and decorations ==
- Knight's Cross of the Iron Cross on 15 August 1940 as Generalleutnant and commander of 20. Infanterie-Division (mot.)
- Iron Cross, 1st Class (1939)
- 1939 Clasp to the Iron Cross 2nd Class
- 1914 Iron Cross 2nd Class (World War I award)
- Wehrmacht Long Service Award 1st Class

== Notes ==
Military offices
Preceded by Generalleutnant Maximilian Schwandner	Commander of 20. Infanterie-Division (mot.); 10 November 1938 – 10 November 1940	Succeeded by General der Infanterie Hans Zorn
Preceded by General der Artillerie Peter Weyer	Commander of XXVIII. Armeekorps; 25 November 1940 – 27 October 1941	Succeeded by General der Artillerie Herbert Loch
