= Kazimierz Mastalerz =

Polish military commander (1894–1939)

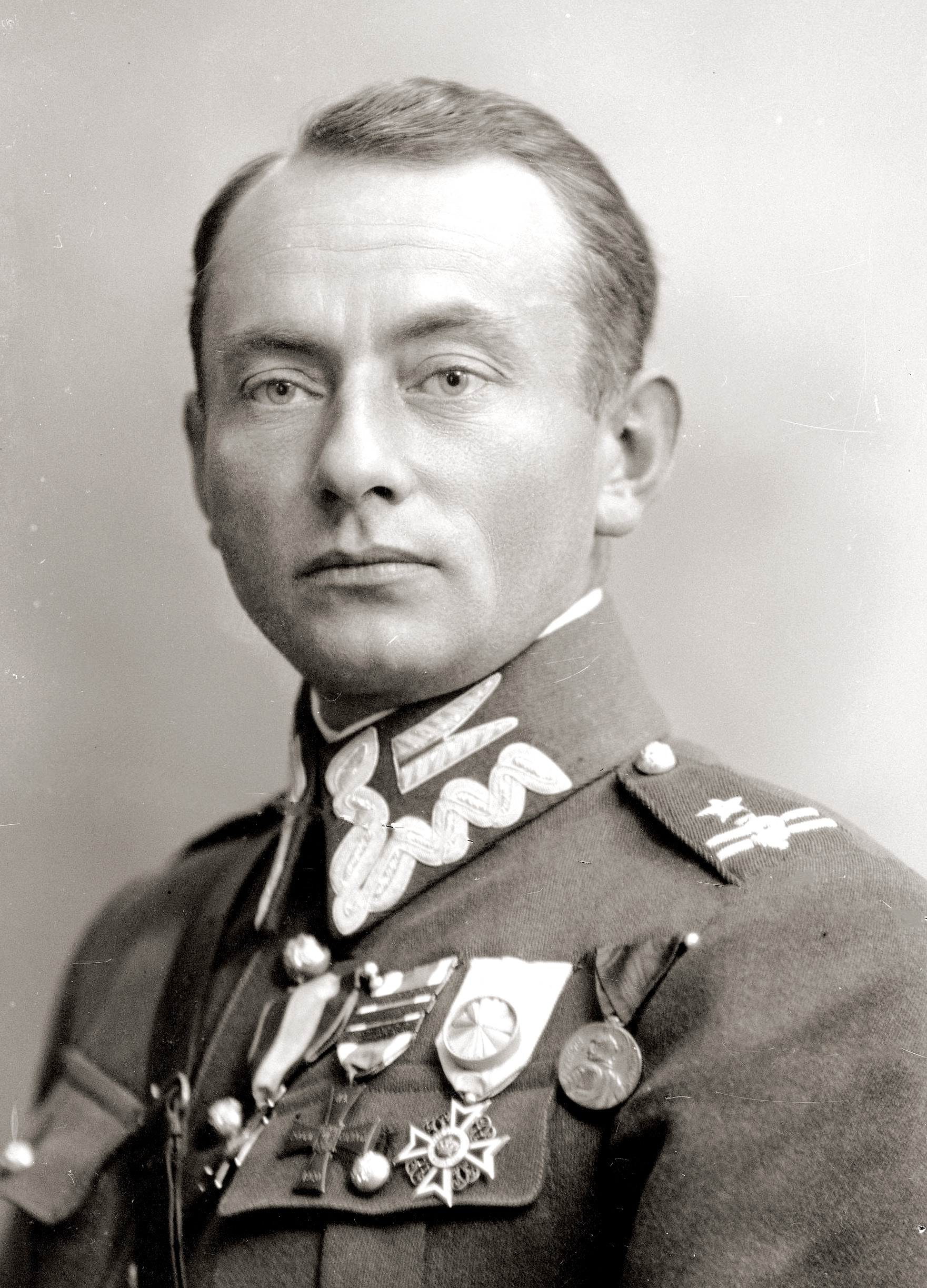
Kazimierz Mastalerz

Kazimierz Władysław Mastalerz (20 November 1894 in Czeladź or Sosnowiec – 1 September 1939 at Krojanty) was a Polish military commander of the 18th Pomeranian Uhlan Regiment.

He was the son of Jan Mastalerz (1858–1947), train driver, and née Dobke Sophia (1875–1937). He attended high school in Częstochowa. He belonged to the National Youth Organisation of Secondary Schools and the Organization of the Polish Youth "Future" (PET). In September 1912 he co-founded the scout team. At the end of 1912, as a student of class VII, he was arrested by the Russians and taken into custody in Częstochowa. After his release he moved to Warsaw, where he attended school. Fearing re-arrest, he moved to Lviv, and there continued his studies at Matura courses. In 1914, he passed the exams. During this period he was a member of the Polish Rifle Teams.

From 1914 he served in a Squadron 1st Regiment of Cavalry of the First Brigade of the Polish Legions. After the Oath crisis from July 1917 to 1918 he was interned in Szczypiorno near Kalisz, then in Łomża. From November 1918 he served in a Cavalry Regiment. He participated in the defense of Lviv, then in the Polish–Bolshevik War. In April 1919 he was appointed second lieutenant, and in August 1920 he was promoted to lieutenant and captain.

In 1925–1926 he served in the Border Protection Corps and in May 1926 he was promoted to the rank of Major. In 1926–1930 he served again in the 1st Regiment of Cavalry. In 1930 he was appointed lieutenant colonel. In March 1930 in Kraków, Mastalerz took command of the 8 Cavalry Regiment. He held this position until 1939. In 1934, he was promoted to colonel. On 1 August 1939 he was appointed to command the 18th Pomeranian Cavalry Regiment, which was part of the Pomeranian Cavalry Brigade.

Mastalerz saw action in the German Invasion of Poland at the outset of World War II. On 1 September he died commanding his cavalry unit during the Charge at Krojanty, when he was cut down by machine gun fire. He was killed while trying to rescue Eugeniusz Świeściak, the commander of the 1st Squadron of the 18th Pomeranian Cavalry.

He was buried at the cemetery in Chojnice.

Kazimierz Mastalerz was married to Janina née Krępska. He had no children.

== Decorations ==
- Double-Cross of Military Virtue: 5 class (1920), 4 class (1939, posthumously),
- Independence Cross,
- Cross of Valour (3-fold)
- On 7 December 1927 he was awarded the Silver Cross of Merit
- Gold Cross of Merit (1937).
