= Józef Werobej =

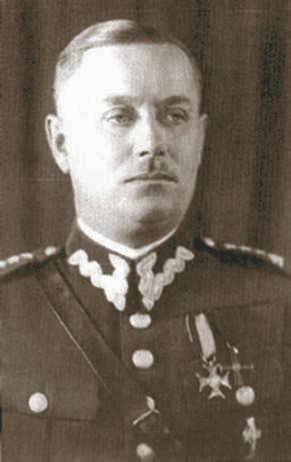
- Born: September 19, 1890; Zalesie, Grodno Governorate, Russian Empire
- Died: April 27, 1976 (aged 85); London, Greater London, England, United Kingdom
- Burial place: Gunnersbury Cemetery, Hounslow, London
- Military career
- Allegiance: Russian Empire; Poland
- Branch: Imperial Russian Army; Polish Armed Forces; Polish Armed Forces in the West
- Service years: 1912–1945
- Rank: Colonel
- Conflicts: World War I; Polish–Soviet War; Battle of Borkowo; World War II; Battle of Tuchola Forest

Józef Werobej was a Polish infantry officer who served in the Imperial Russian Army and a colonel in the Polish Army appointed by the Polish authorities in exile as a brigadier general. Knight of the Order of Virtuti Militari.

== Biography ==
After graduating from the classical gymnasium in Vilnius, in 1912 to 1917 he served in the Imperial Russian army, where he graduated from the school of non-commissioned officers (1913) and the school for ensigns (1915). He was a professional infantry officer. He participated in the battles in the World War I during the First World War. In December 1917 he joined the Officer's League of the Polish I Corps in Russia. In the period from August 1918 to July 1920, he commanded a company and battalion of the 1st Polish Rifle Regiment (later the 43rd Bajończyk Regiment ) of the Blue Army, commanded by General Józef Haller.

He took part in the Polish-Soviet War. From August 1920 to December 1931, acting, then commander of the 83rd infantry regiment in Kobryn. From December 1931 to December 1934, he was commander of the 44th Infantry Regiment of Borderlands Rifles in Równe. As the oldest regiment commander, from January to August 1933 he was the division commander in the absence of Brigadier General Edmund Knoll-Kownacki and Col. dipl. Bronisław Regulski, and was division infantry commander. From this second officer, in December 1934, he took over the duties of the division commander of the 13th Infantry Division and served them until March 1939, when he was given command of the 9th Infantry Division in Siedlce.

He was the chairman of the board of the Volyn Regional Ice Hockey Association.

He commanded the 9th Infantry Division during the September Campaign. As part of the "Pomeranian" Army, he performed the task of defending the passages through the "Pomeranian Corridor" in front of the 19th Guderian Corps . After breaking up the division in Bory Tucholskie, he managed to get out of the encirclement and join the staff of the Pomeranian Army. On September 13, he formally took command of the 4th Infantry Division . On September 19 he was taken prisoner by the Germans.

During the war, he was in the Oflag II-C, where he was in charge of the underground activity for some time.

After his release from captivity from the Polish Armed Forces in the West, Werobej as the first deputy commander of the 5th Kresowa Infantry Division in Italy and the United Kingdom. After demobilization, he took an active part in veteran circles. He was hit by a car in London. He is buried in Gunnersbury Cemetery in London.

== Awards ==
- Virtuti Militari, Gold Cross
- Virtuti Militari, Silver Cross (1921)
- Cross of Independence (August 2, 1931)
- Order of Polonia Restituta (November 11, 1937)
- Cross of Valour (Awarded 4 Times)
- Cross of Merit, Gold Cross (March 17, 1930)
- Army Medal for War 1939-1945

== Bibliography ==
- Officer's Yearbook 1923. Warsaw: Ministry of Military Affairs. 1923.
- Officer's Yearbook 1924. Warsaw: Ministry of Military Affairs. 1924.
- Officer's Yearbook 1928. Warsaw: Ministry of Military Affairs. 1928.
- Officer's Yearbook 1932. Warsaw: Ministry of Military Affairs. 1932.
- Kryska-Karski, Tadeusz; Żurakowski, Stanisław (1991). Generals of independent Poland. Warsaw: Editions Meetings.
- Jurga, Tadeusz; Strzałkowski, Waldemar (1990). "Biographies of the commanders of Polish units in the defense war of 1939". Defense of Poland 1939. Warsaw: PAX Publishing Institute. ISBN 8321110967.
