= 18th Pomeranian Uhlan Regiment =

Polish cavalry unit

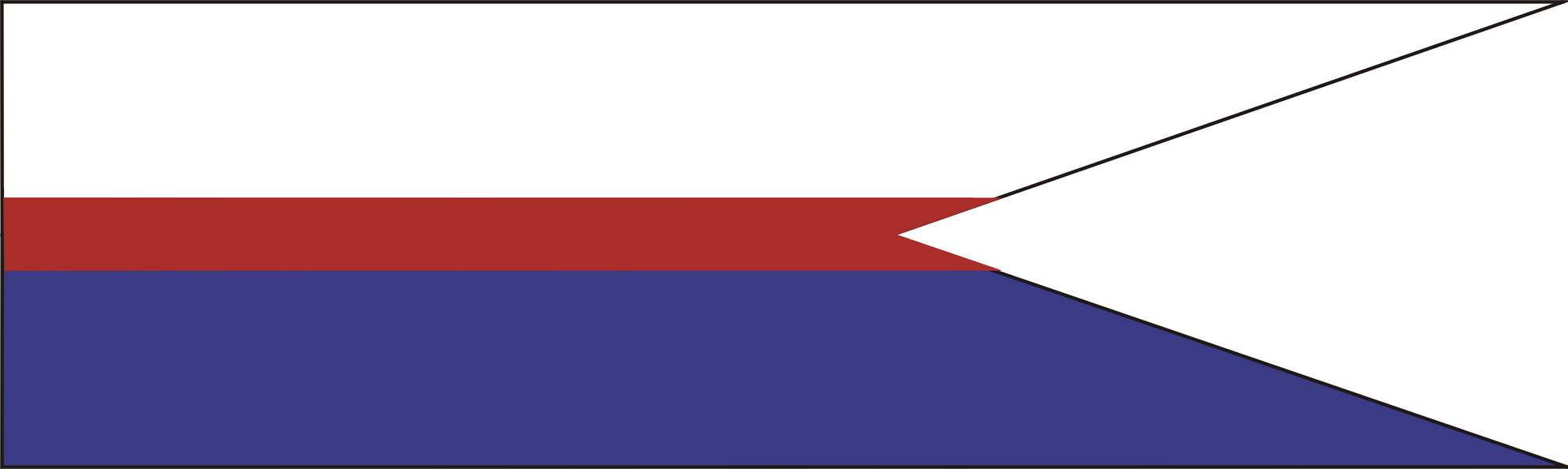
Flag of the 18th Pomeranian Uhlan Regiment

18th Pomeranian Uhlan Regiment (Polish: 18 Pulk Ulanów Pomorskich, 18 p.ul.) was a cavalry unit of the Polish Army in the Second Polish Republic. Formed in April 1919 in Poznań, it fought in the Polish-Soviet War and the Invasion of Poland. In the interbellum period, the regiment was garrisoned in Grudziądz (since September 1923). Pomeranian uhlans became famous for the legendary Charge at Krojanty, after which the unit ceased to exist.

== Beginnings ==
In April 1919, following the order of commandant of Greater Poland Front, General Jozef Dowbor-Musnicki, a cavalry unit was formed in Poznań. In July 1919, the unit was named 4th Greater Poland Uhlan Regiment, with Colonel August Brochwitz-Donimirski (former officer of the Imperial German Army) as its commandant.

By late October 1919, First Squadron of the regiment was fully equipped and trained. The unit was tasked with seizing parts of formerly German province of West Prussia, which were attached to Poland (see Polish Corridor). On January 18, 1920, it entered Toruń, to be later moved to Grudziądz after the Germans had abandoned this city. In February 1920, its name was officially changed into the 18th Pomeranian Uhlan Regiment, and in late May 1920, the regiment was sent to the Soviet front.

In early summer 1920, Pomeranian uhlans fought in northeastern corner of the Second Polish Republic, along the Daugava (river), where it engaged Soviet cavalry under Hayk Bzhishkyan. On July 5, 1920, it was encircled by the enemy near Druja. To escape Soviet captivity, the uhlans decided to swim across the Daugava, and enter the territory of neutral Latvia. Polish soldiers reached Daugavpils, and on July 22 were transported by rail to Riga. Six days later, 60 Polish soldiers were loaded on the Pomeranian, but the bulk of the regiment remained in Riga.

On August 11, Latvia signed a peace treaty with Soviet Russia. Fearing disarmament by the Latvian authorities, the Poles marched towards the port of Memel, which at that time was a free city, occupied by French troops. The regiment reached Palanga, where it was disarmed. After several days, the uhlans in mufti, were loaded on boats, and on August 18 arrived at Danzig. Unable to anchor at this port, the regiment finally left the boats at nearby Gdynia. On August 22, the unit returned to Torun.

The Pomeranian uhlans remained in Toruń until mid-September 1920, when they were transported by rail to Hajnówka. At that time, the regiment had 32 officers, 630 soldiers and 610 horses. On September 19, the unit was attached to Operational Group of General Wladyslaw Jung, and was sent to the frontline near Vawkavysk, to fight in the Battle of the Niemen River. Pomeranian uhlans remained in eastern Poland until May 5, 1921, when they returned to Grudziądz.

== 1939 Invasion of Poland ==
On August 26, 1939, the regiment, commanded by Colonel Kazimierz Masztalerz, became part of Chojnice Group of Polish Army. The unit was tasked with protecting the area of Chojnice and nearby Rytel.

The Germans attacked Polish positions on September 1, 1939, at 5 a.m. After initial clashes, the uhlans were forced to withdraw. In the evening of the first day of the war, the Charge at Krojanty took place.

Following the charge, and subsequent Luftwaffe attack near Drzycim, the regiment ceased to exist as a cohesive unit (September 4). Among those KIA at Krojanty, was Colonel Mastalerz himself.

== Commandants ==
- Colonel August Donimirski (May 1919 – November 1920)
- Colonel Rudolf Alzner (November 1920 – July 1922)
- Colonel Michal Ostrowski (July 1922 – April 1923)
- Colonel Stefan Dembinski (May 1923 – January 1928)
- Colonel Albert Traeger (January 1928 – May 1932)
- Colonel Kazimierz Kosiarski (May 1932 – February 1938)
- Colonel Tadeusz Kurnatowski (February 1938 – August 1, 1939)
- Colonel Kazimierz Mastalerz (August 1 – September 1, 1939)

== Symbols ==
The regimental flag was funded by residents of Pomerelia, and handed to the unit in Torun, on May 29, 1923. In recognition of extraordinary service of Pomeranian uhlans during the Polish-Soviet War, the flag was awarded Silver Cross of the Virtuti Militari.

The badge of the regiment, approved in April 1925, featured the Pomeranian Griffin. The regiment had its own zurawiejka.

== See also ==
- Horses in World War II
- Polish cavalry

== Sources ==
- Włodzimierz Błaszczyk: 18 Pułk Ułanów. Pruszków: Oficyna Wydawnicza Ajans, 1996
- Roman Abraham: Wspomnienia wojenne znad Warty i Bzury. Warsaw: Wydawnictwo Ministerstwa Obrony Narodowej, 1990
