= 9th Infantry Division (Poland) =

Historic division of the Polish Army

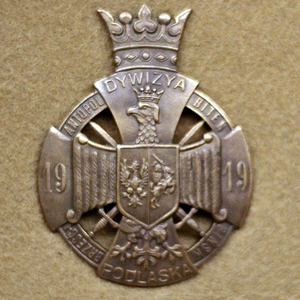
- Badge of the division with the year of its founding on it
- Active: 1919 – 5 September 1939; January 1942 – 4 April 1942; 1944 – 7 March 1962
- Country: Second Polish Republic
- Branch: Pomorze Army (1939); Anders Army (1942); Polish People's Army (1944-1962)
- Role: Infantry
- Garrison/HQ: Siedlce (1919-1939); Margilon (1942)
- Engagements: Polish-Soviet War: Kiev offensive; May Coup; World War II: Invasion of Poland; Prague offensive

The 9th Infantry Division (Polish: 9 Dywizja Piechoty) was a unit of the Polish Army in the Second Polish Republic. For most of 1919, the 9th Division's regiments were dispersed across the regions of Podlachia, Polesie and Volhynia, with one battalion sent to Dąbrowa Basin.

== Formation ==
The division was originally formed in 1919. Stationed in Siedlce. The 9th Division's history begins in the early summer of 1919. It was formed on June 12 of that year, in Polesia, out of units of Operational Group Polesie, commanded by General Antoni Listowski. At that time, it was divided into two Infantry Brigades and one Artillery Brigade:

- 17th Infantry Brigade (15th and 22nd Infantry Regiments),
- 18th Infantry Brigade (34th and 35th Infantry Regiments),
- 9th Artillery Brigade (9th Field Artillery Regiment, 9th Heavy Artillery Regiment).

== Polish and German conflict ==
On February 5, 1919, the division attacked the German-occupied Brest Fortress. After four days, the Germans decided to negotiate, and hand over the fortress, together with Terespol, to General Listowski. A commemorative parade took place in Brześć Litewski on February 13, and soon afterwards, the 34th Regiment was transported by rail to Kobryn to defend the line of the Mukhavets.

== Polish–Soviet War ==
=== 1919 ===
On February 17, the Red Army clashed with Poles near Antopal, which was the first battle of the Polish–Soviet War.

On February 28, the infantry units of General Listowski advanced east towards Pinsk. Divided into three groups, the Poles captured Drahichyn and Janów Poleski, and then advanced along the rail line from Brześć to Pinsk. Finally, on March 5, the Poles seized Pinsk and then headed towards Luniniec, but failed to capture this important rail junction.

On July 1, 1919, divisions of the Polish Lithuanian-Belarusian Front began an offensive to capture Minsk and to reach the line of the Berezina river. The 9th Division protected the right flank of the Polish front, seizing the important rail junction of Luniniec on July 10. The Soviets several times tried to recapture the town, but their attacks failed. Finally, in August 1919, the division captured Sluck, reaching the line of the Sluch river. It spent the winter of 1919/1920 keeping the positions along the Sluch.

=== 1920 ===
In March 1920, the 9th Division was ordered to attack and capture another important rail junction at Mazyr. The offensive began on the night of March 4, and by the afternoon of March 5, after crossing 70 kilometres, Mozyr was in Polish hands. The division then took defensive positions, repelling several Soviet raids.

On April 25, 1920, the Kiev offensive began. During the fighting in the Kyiv area, the Polesie Group of the Polish Army (General Władysław Sikorski) was ordered to attack and reach the line of the Dnieper near its confluence with the Prypec. On April 26, the 9th Division seized Czernobyl, and on May 9, it captured Recyca. Six days later, Polish units reached the Dnieper.

In early June 1920, the Soviet 12th Army crossed the Dnieper, threatening Polish forces in Kyiv with encirclement. On June 17, the Polish front was broken, and a general retreat was ordered. On July 4, the armies of Mikhail Tukhachevsky and Semyon Budyonny initiated a general offensive. The 9th Division withdrew to the Styr line, but the Soviets crossed it on July 21. In late July, two regiments of the division were transported to the area of Grodno, fighting the Cavalry Army of Hayk Bzhishkyan. There, the Polish retreat continued. Near Jablonka, the 34th Infantry Regiment was almost destroyed by the enemy, with losses reaching up to 75%.

In early August, the division regrouped in the area of Modlin, with the 41st Infantry Regiment attached to it, to replace the destroyed 34th Infantry Regiment. As part of the Fifth Army, it was tasked with protecting the left wing of the Polish Northern Front until the planned Wieprz river offensive.

On August 14, the division began offensive from its positions along the Wkra river. By August 16, it captured Nasielsk and advanced towards Ciechanów. On August 30, the division was transported by rail from Ciechanów to Chełm, where it joined the Third Army. On September 3, Marshal Józef Piłsudski decorated many of its soldiers with medals and awards. After a parade, the division was ordered to capture Hrubieszów. The assault began on September 5, and on the next day, the town was seized. The division remained in the south until September 19, capturing Lutsk and Dubno.

In late September 1920, the division was transported northwards to guard the Polish–Lithuanian demarcation line. It was stationed near Wolkowysk, and two of its regiments were incorporated into the armed forces of the Republic of Central Lithuania.

== Second Polish Republic ==
In 1921, the headquarters and the 22nd Infantry Regiment were moved to the permanent location in the garrison of Siedlce. The 34th Infantry Regiment was stationed in Biała Podlaska, and the 35th Infantry Regiment in Brzesc nad Bugiem.

On November 3, 1922, during a ceremony in Siedlce, the division's flag was handed to its soldiers by Józef Piłsudski. The flag was funded by the residents of the counties of Siedlce, Łuków and Janów Lubelski. In December 1922, after the election in which Gabriel Narutowicz became the President of Poland, the division sent two battalions to Warsaw to prevent street fighting.

During May Coup of 1926, the 9th Division supported the rebellion and its leader, Józef Piłsudski. Its 22nd Regiment was involved in the coup from the very beginning. Commandant of the Siedlce garrison, Colonel Franciszek Sikorski, sent on May 12, 1926, his soldiers to guard strategic locations in the town, including its important rail junction. Two battalions of soldiers, on the way from Siedlce to Warsaw, were halted at the station in Mińsk Mazowiecki, by the uhlans of the 7th Regiment of Lublin Uhlans. After brief negotiations, the uhlans joined the infantry from Siedlce, and the whole group reached Rembertów in the early afternoon. In the evening, soldiers of the 9th Division fought on the streets of Warsaw, and after the coup, officers of the unit were decorated by Piłsudski for their loyalty.

In 1933, the 9th Light Artillery Regiment was garrisoned in Siedlce.

== 1939 Invasion of Poland ==
As part of Pomorze Army the 9th I.D. defended the 70-kilometer line between the town of Pruszcz and the village of Gostycyn in Polish Pomerania. The division fought in the 1939 Defensive War under Colonel Józef Werobej. In the morning of September 1, 1939, it was attacked by three Wehrmacht divisions – 2nd Armored-Motorized, 3rd Armored and 32nd I.D. After heavy fighting, the Poles withdrew in the evening to the area of Cekcyn. Another defence line was established there, but the Germans broke it, and the 9th I.D. retreated over the Brda and to the suburbs of Bydgoszcz.

The 2nd Motorized Infantry Division advanced in the north, facing Polish 35th Infantry Regiment. The 3rd Panzer Division in the middle, and the 32nd Infantry Division in the south, along the Brda river, where it faced Polish 22nd Infantry Regiment.

On the night of September 1/2, Polish units retreated behind the Brda, concentrating near Bysławek. The 22nd Regiment was transferred to the 15th Infantry Division and sent to Bydgoszcz, while remaining subunits of the 9th Division were ordered to join forces with the 27th Infantry Division, and to attack German panzer columns, heading towards the Brda.

Since the 27th Division did not arrive on time, General Władysław Bortnowski ordered both units to attack simultaneously, with the support of Czersk Operational Group. Thus, the Polish attack was set to begin on the morning of September 3, and the objective was to push the Germans back behind the Brda. However, since both Polish divisions failed to cooperate as their communication failed, the assault turned into a failure, with the German 3rd Armored Division managing to halt it.

After the defeat, the 9th I.D. gathered in the forests north of Bydgoszcz. Soon afterwards, it was attacked by the Luftwaffe. Unable to defend itself and without air support, the division scattered and ceased to exist. Only the 35th Infantry Regiment remained as a unit and managed to break out of the German encirclement on September 5.

== Later in World War II ==
The 9th Infantry Division was reformed as part of the Anders Army briefly in January 1942 in the town of Margilon. It was commanded by Colonel Marian Bolesławicz until it was disbanded on 4 April 1942. The Polish Home Army formed the 9th Home Army Infantry Division and was active in 1944. Additionally, the Polish People's Army reformed the 9th Infantry Division in 1944 in the city of Białystok. It participated in the Prague offensive.

== Cold War ==
On 7 March 1962, the division was disbanded and its remaining elements were reorganized into the 9th Mechanised Division.

== See also ==
- Polish army order of battle in 1939
- Polish contribution to World War II
- List of Polish divisions in World War II

== Bibliography ==
- 9 Dywizja Piechoty w dziejach oręża polskiego. Pruszków: Ajaks. 1995. ISBN 83-85621-75-X.
- Biegański, Witold (1990). Polskie Siły Zbrojne na Zachodzie 1939-1945 [Polish Armed Forces in the West 1939-1945] (in Polish). Krajowa Agencja Wydawnicza. ISBN 9788303029232.
- Tadeusz Jurga: Wojsko Polskie : krótki informator historyczny o Wojsku Polskim w latach II wojny światowej. 7, Regularne jednostki Wojska Polskiego w 1939 : organizacja, działania bojowe, uzbrojenie, metryki związków operacyjnych, dywizji i brygad. Warszawa : Wydawnictwo Ministerstwa Obrony Narodowej 1975.
- Wyszczelski, Lech (2006). Wojsko Polskie w latach 1918–1921. Warszawa: Wydawnictwo Neriton. ISBN 83-89729-56-3.
- Jagiełło, Zdzisław (2007). Piechota Wojska Polskiego 1918–1939. Warszawa: Bellona. ISBN 978-83-11-10206-4.
- Krivosheev, Grigoriy (1997). Soviet Casualties and Combat Losses in the Twentieth Century. London: Greenhill Books. ISBN 1-85367-280-7.
- "Almanach oficerski": praca zbiorowa, Wojskowy Instytut Naukowo-Wydawniczy, Warszawa 1923
- "Księga chwały piechoty": komitet redakcyjny pod przewodnictwem płk. dypl. Bolesława Prugara Ketlinga, Departament Piechoty MSWojsk, Warszawa 1937–1939. Reprint: Wydawnictwo Bellona Warszawa 1992
