= Juliusz Drapella =

Polish brigadier general

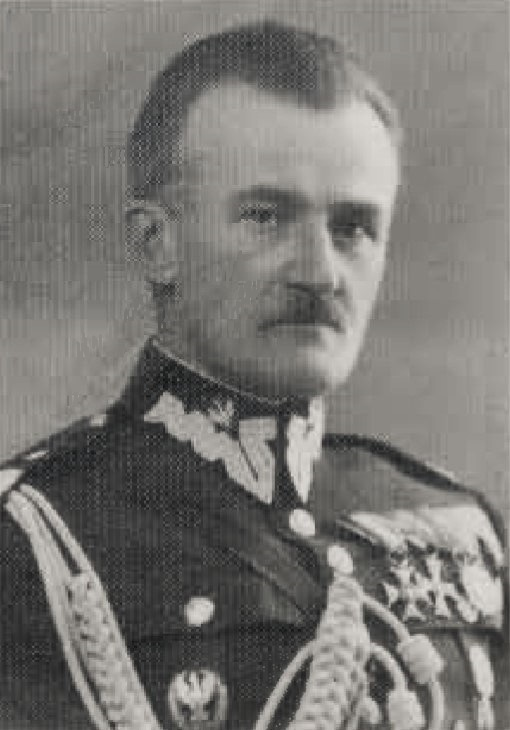
- Born: December 3, 1886; Wieprz, Kingdom of Galicia and Lodomeria, Austria-Hungary
- Died: October 25, 1946 (aged 59); Nice, Alpes-Maritimes, France
- Burial place: Russian Orthodox Cemetery, Nice, France
- Military career
- Allegiance: Austria-Hungary; Poland
- Branch: Austro-Hungarian Army; Polish Armed Forces
- Service years: 1907–1908; 1914–1946
- Rank: Brigadier General
- Conflicts: World War I; Polish–Soviet War; World War II; Battle of Tuchola Forest; Battle of Bzura

Juliusz Alfred Drapella was a Polish brigadier general of the Polish Armed Forces who was most notable during his service in World War II.

== Biography ==
Juliusz Alfred Drapella was born on November 3, 1886, in Wieprz, to the family of Ludwik Drapella (1852–1935) and Maria née Mierowska. In 1906 he graduated from a seven-class real school with a high school diploma in Kromieryż and began studying at the TU Wien. In 1908 he moved to the Vienna University of Economics and Business.

In the period from October 1, 1907, to October 30, 1908, he completed his compulsory one-year military service in the Austro-Hungarian army . He completed his commercial studies in Vienna. In the years 1910–1914 he was a member of "Sokoł" in Żywiec. He was appointed to the rank of cadet with seniority on January 1, 1911, in the corps of officers of the infantry reserve, and his parent unit was the infantry regiment No. 56 in Kraków. In 1913 he was renamed a cadet to a warrant officer with the preservation of seniority. In the years 1912–1913, he took part in the mobilization of the armed forces of the Austro-Hungarian Monarchy, introduced in connection with the First and Second Balkan Wars with the mobilization of Austria-Hungary and in the years 1914–1918 he fought on the fronts of World War I. His parent unit was still the 56th infantry regiment. He was appointed to the rank of lieutenant with seniority on November 1, 1915, in the corps of infantry reserve officers In 1915 he received the highest praise for bravery.

On July 7, 1919, he was admitted to the Polish Army from the former Austro-Hungarian army, with the approval of the rank of lieutenant with seniority from November 1, 1915, included in the 1st Army Reserve with simultaneous appointment to active service during the war and assigned to the 12th Infantry Regiment. During the Polish–Soviet War, he was, among others, commander of the backup battalion in Żywiec, chief of staff of the Group of General Aleksandrowicz and General Krajowski, deputy chief of staff and chief of the Operational Department of the Staff of the 4th Infantry Division and chief of staff of the 18th Infantry Division (September 26, 1920 – June 30, 1921).

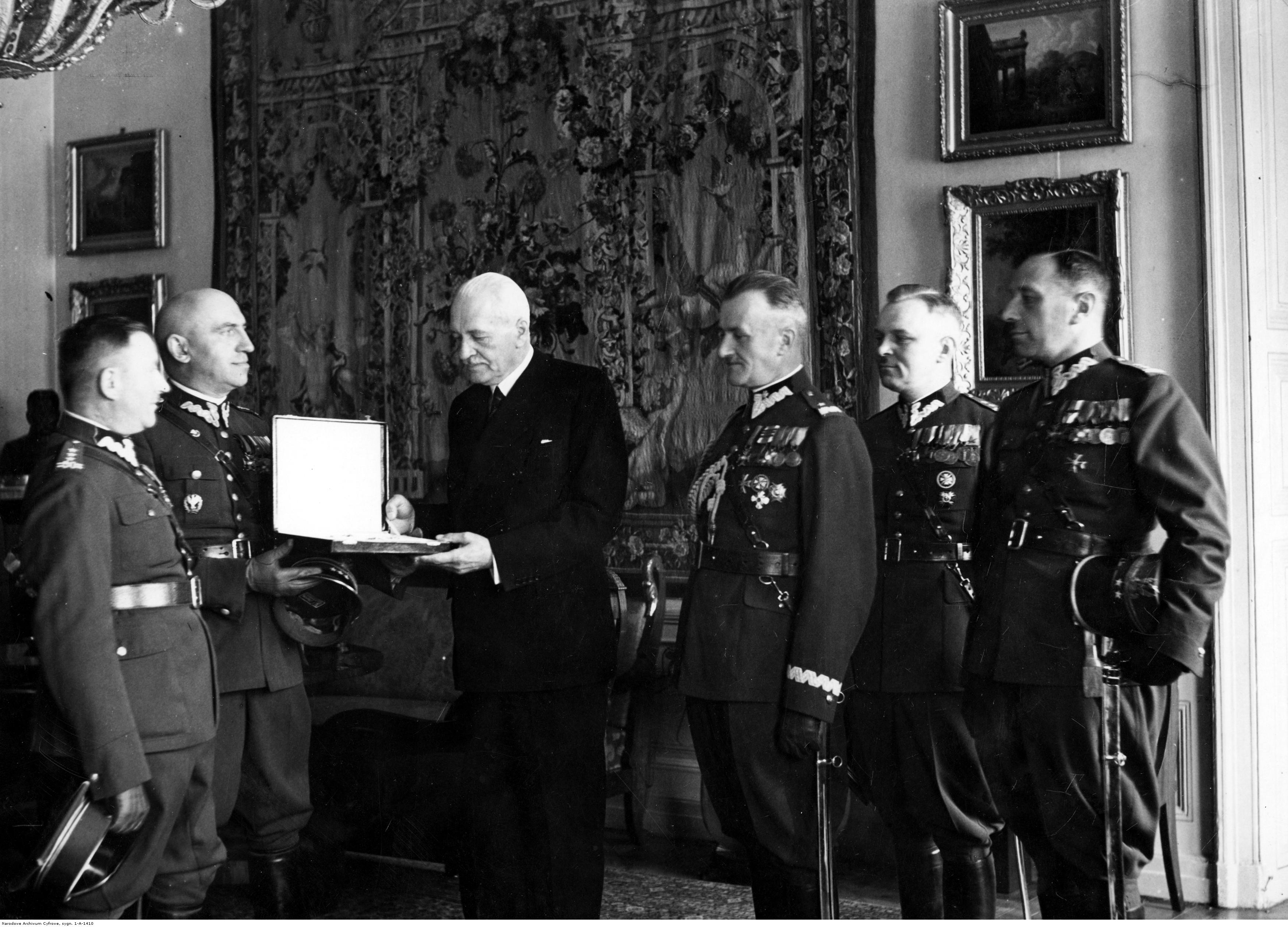
Delegation of the 27th Infantry Division with the President of the Republic of Poland Ignacy Mościcki in 1936 (gen. Drapella, 3rd from right)

On November 20, 1922, he was appointed deputy chief of staff of the Command of the Corps District No. II in Lublin. On April 1, 1923, he was decommissioned for a period of 6 months without the right to conscription. In the years 1923–1924 he was a student of the Training Course at the Wyższa Szkoła Wojenna in Warsaw. On October 15, 1924, after completing the course and receiving the academic diploma of an officer of the General Staff, he was assigned to the Command of the Corps District No. III in Grodno as the head of the General Division. On November 2 this year, he was transferred to an identical position in the Headquarters of the Corps District No. VI in Lviv. On December 1, 1924, the President of the Republic of Poland, Stanisław Wojciechowski, at the request of the Minister of Military Affairs, Major General Władysław Sikorski, promoted him to senior colonel on August 15, 1924, and on the 46th position in the corps of infantry officers. On January 14, 1925, he was transferred from DOK VI in Lviv to the Army Inspectorate No. IV in Kraków to the position of the first clerk. On October 15, 1925, he was transferred to the 73rd infantry regiment in Katowice as the regiment commander. On March 31, 1927, he was appointed commander of the infantry division of the 27th Infantry Division in Kovel. On October 29, 1932, he was appointed commander of the 27th Infantry Division. On December 17, 1933, the President of the Republic of Poland, Ignacy Mościcki, appointed him Brigadier General with seniority on January 1, 1934, and 2nd in the corps of generals. He held the position of the division commander until September 1939.

In the September Campaign, he commanded the 27th Infantry Division in the "Pomorze" Army, and from 6 to 11 September also the Operational Group of his own name. On September 20 he was seriously wounded in the Battle of Bzura. He got to Modlin, from where he was taken prisoner by the Germans after the capitulation of the fortress. He stayed in Oflag VII-A Murnau. After his release in 1945, he settled in France. He intended to return to Poland. He died of heart disease on October 25, 1946, in Nice. He was buried at the local Caucade cemetery (plot 48, row 3 from the entrance, grave 2 from the hedge). He was married and had a son.

== Promotions ==
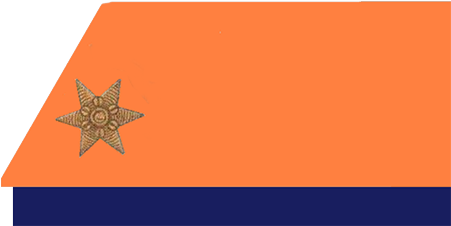
- Leutnant (Second lieutenant) - 1914
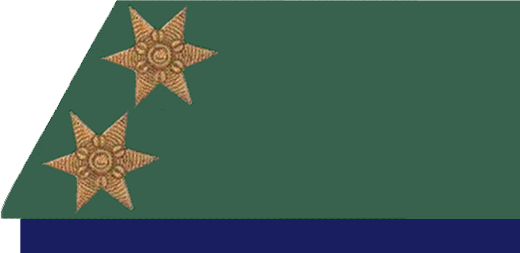
- Oberleutnant (First lieutenant) - 1915
- Kapitan (Captain) - 1920
- Major (Major) - 1920
- Podpułkownik (Lieutenant colonel) - 1922
- Pułkownik (Colonel) - 1924
- Generał brygady (Brigadier general) - 1934

== Awards ==
- Silver Cross of Virtuti Militari (30 June 1920)
- Cross of Valour (three times, 1922)
- Gold Cross of Merit (17 March 1930)
- Commemorative Medal for the War of 1918–1921
- Medal of the Decade of Regained Independence
- Military Merit Cross, 3rd class with war decoration and swords
- Silver Military Merit Medal
- Bronze Military Merit Medal
- Karl Troop Cross
- Mobilization Cross 1912/13

== Bibliography ==
- Kryska-Karski, Tadeusz; Żurakowski, Stanisław (1991). Generals of independent Poland. Warsaw: Editions Meetings.
- Piotr Stawecki (1994). Biographical dictionary of the generals of the Polish Army 1918-1939. Warsaw: Bellona. pp. 103–104. ISBN 83-11-08262-6. OCLC 830050159.
- Zbigniew Miekietański (1990). Generals of the Second Republic. Warsaw: Polonia Publishing House. pp. 71–76. ISBN 83-7021-096-1.
- Jurga, Tadeusz (1990). Defense of Poland 1939. Warsaw: PAX Publishing Institute. pp. 761–762. ISBN 83-211-1096-7.
- Zakrzewski, Bartosz (2016). 18th Infantry Division of the Polish Army in the Polish–Soviet war. Warsaw: Neriton Publishing House. ISBN 9788375434156.
