= 27th Infantry Division (Poland) =

27th Infantry Division 27 Dywizja Piechoty
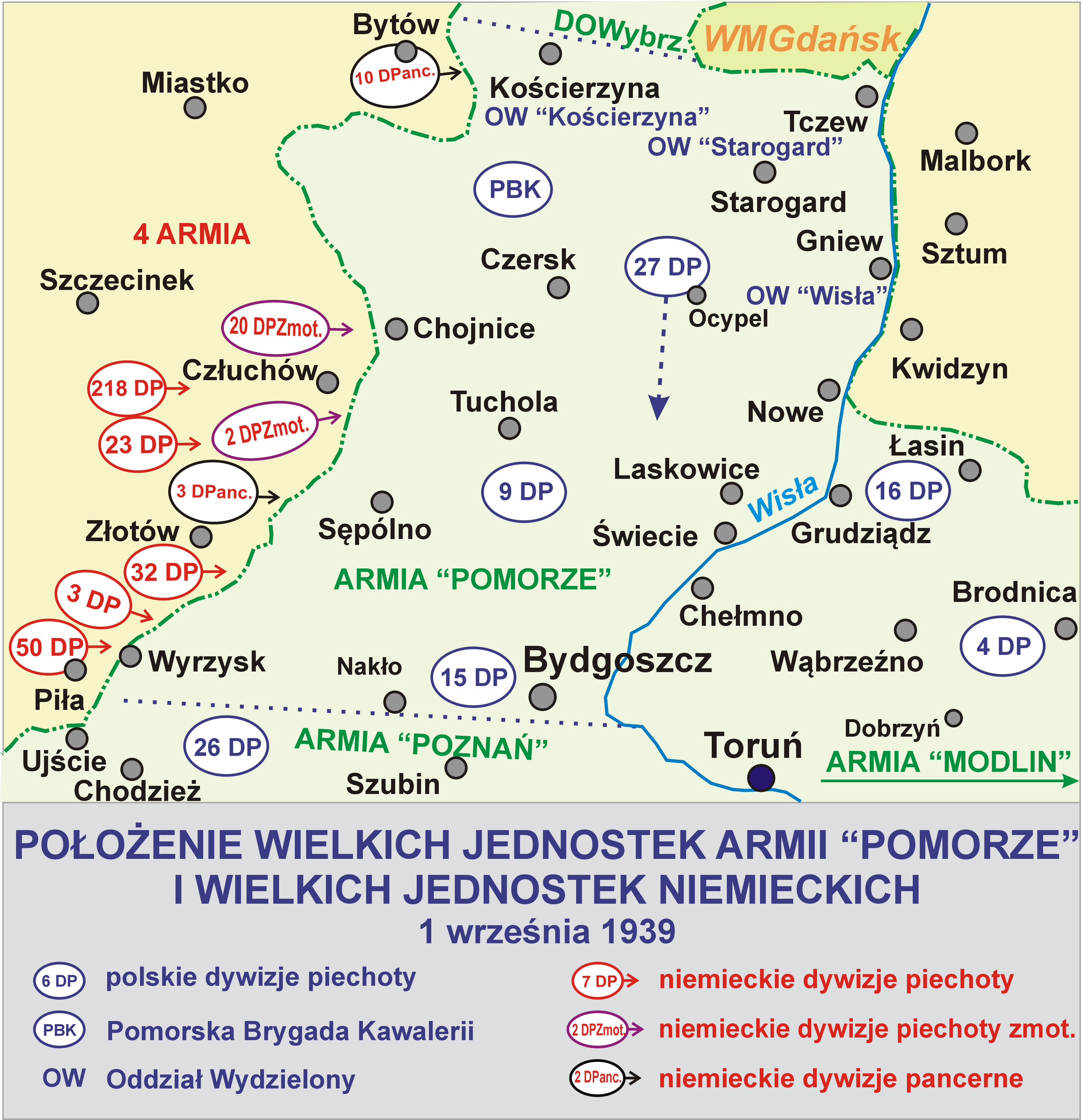
- Active: 1920–1939
- Country: Poland
- Branch: Infantry
- Part of: Pomeranian Army
- Garrison/HQ: Kowel
- Engagements: Polish September Campaign

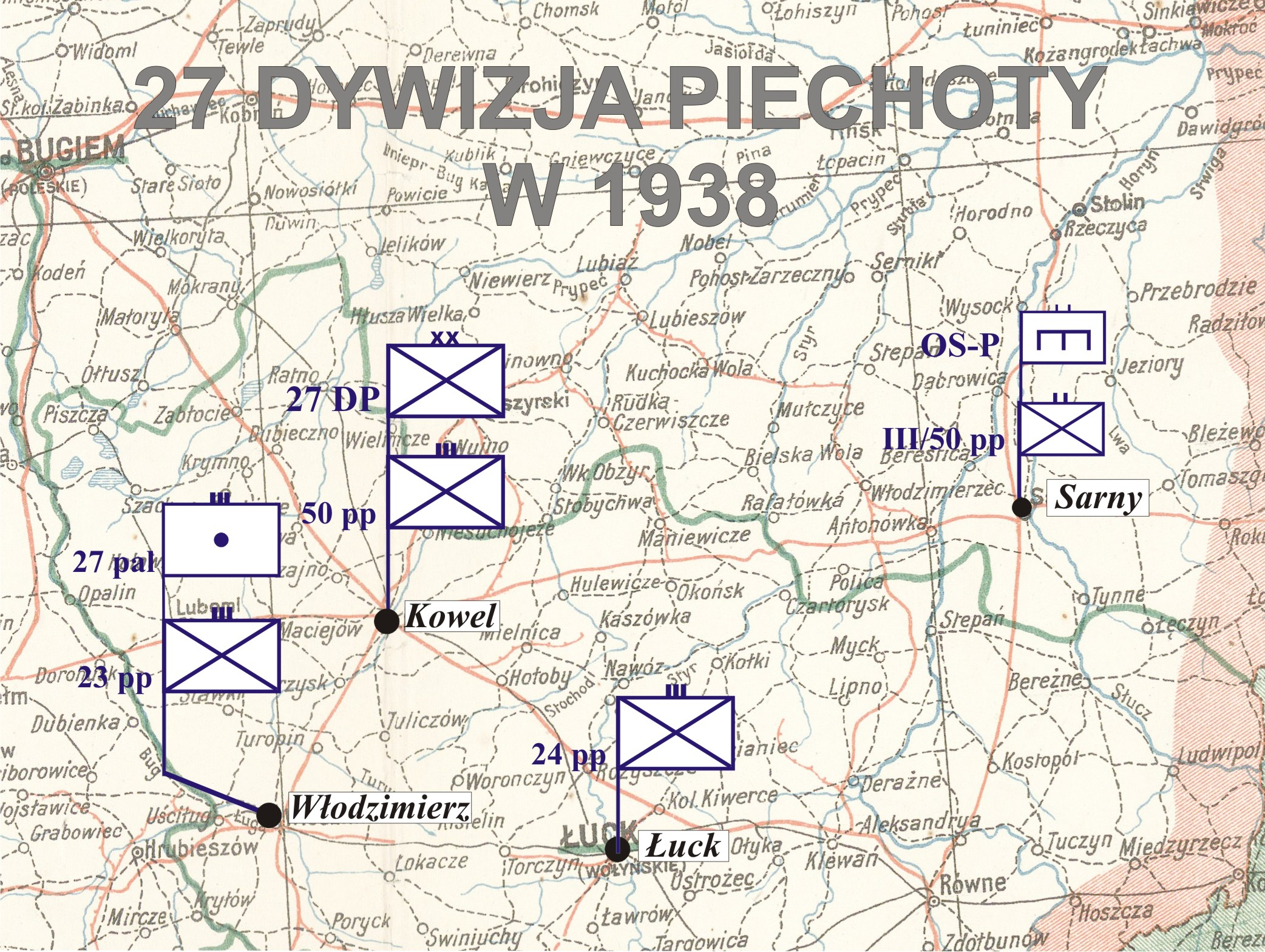
27 DP w 1938

The 27 Infantry Division (Polish: 27 Dywizja Piechoty), was a unit of the Polish Army in the inter-war period. It was created on 18 October 1920, as a result of reorganization of the Army, from units of the 2nd I.D., 3rd I.D., and 13th I.D. Its headquarters were located in Kowel, with units stationed in other Volhynian towns, such as Lutsk, Sarny and Wlodzimierz Wolynski. The Division's first commandant was General Gustaw Kuchinka.

== Participation in Polish September Campaign ==
The Division, under General Juliusz Drapella, was mobilized between 14 and 16 August 1939. In the following days it was transported by rail to the area of Bydgoszcz and Inowrocław, and finally, by 27 August, it was placed southwest of Starogard Gdański, as part of the Pomorze Army.

On 1 September 1939 (see: Polish September Campaign) the Division was ordered to march towards Toruń. The next day it engaged in heavy fights with the advancing Wehrmacht. On the third day of the war, it was cut off from the Pomorze Army after bloody fights around Terespol Pomorski and Świecie. The Germans managed to destroy the bulk of the unit in a battle waged in forests around Wierzchucin. Remaining parts of the Division managed to reach Bydgoszcz and later Toruń. There, the Division was moved to the rear to reorganize and recuperate.

On 6 September, the Division, renamed into Operational Group of General Drapella and strengthened by reserve units including the 208th Infantry Regiment from Inowrocław and National Defence Battalion Starogard, was ordered to defend Toruń from west. The next day, it began a retreat towards Warsaw, covering the main forces of the Pomorze Army. During the following days, it helped Polish units fighting in the Battle of the Bzura, engaging the Wehrmacht around Solec Kujawski (7–8 September), Włocławek and Brześć Kujawski (9–12 September). Withdrawing towards southeast, it attacked a German outpost near Płock, but without success.

On 16 September, the Group was ordered to march towards Gąbin, but was attacked by the Luftwaffe and German ground forces and destroyed. Separate smaller groups of soldiers managed to break to the besieged fortress of Modlin. Other survivors made it to Warsaw.

Around 19 September, a member of the Division wrapped and buried the Division's flag to prevent its capture by German forces. The flag was discovered in September 1959 and was put on display in the Polish Army Museum.

== Recreation in 1944 ==
In early 1944, the Division was recreated as Polish 27th Home Army Infantry Division and it was the biggest partisan unit in Central Europe with 7,300 soldiers.

== See also ==
- Polish army order of battle in 1939
- Polish contribution to World War II
- List of Polish divisions in World War II
