= XIX Army Corps (Wehrmacht) =

Armored corps of the German Wehrmacht (1939–1945)

- XIX. Armeekorps
- Active: 1 July 1939 - 5 June 1940 (XIX Army Corps); 5 June 1940 - 16 November 1940 (Panzer Group Guderian); Successive Formations: 16 November 1940 - 5 October 1941 (Panzergruppe 2); 5 October 1941 - 8 May 1945 (2nd Panzer Army)
- Country: Nazi Germany
- Branch: Army
- Type: Panzer
- Role: Armoured warfare
- Size: Corps
- Engagements: World War II: Invasion of Poland; Battle of France Successive Formations: Eastern Front

Commanders
- Notable commanders: Heinz Guderian

The XIX Army Corps (German: XIX. Armeekorps) was an armored corps of the German Wehrmacht between 1 July 1939 and 16 November 1940, when the unit was renamed Panzer Group 2 (German: Panzergruppe 2) and later 2nd Panzer Army (German: 2. Panzerarmee). It took part in the Invasion of Poland and the Battle of France.

It was formed in Vienna on 1 July 1939, the same day as the 2nd Panzer Division, but was not assigned to any single military district. Commanded by General der Panzertruppe Heinz Guderian, it was stationed in Pomerania prior to taking part in the invasion of Poland. It was officially tasked with constructing fortifications in preparation for an attack from Polish forces, though in fact German preparations for the invasion were already well advanced. Subordinated within Army Group North (responsible for Poland's north-western Danzig Corridor region) and supplemented by the 3rd Panzer, 2nd Infantry, and 20th Infantry Divisions, XIX Army Corps was tasked to strike southwards towards the Vistula river and thereby prevent any eastwards retreat of Polish troops to its west. Operations began on 1 September 1939, beginning World War II in Europe. During the initial days of the Polish campaign, the XIX Army Corps captured the city of Pruszcz and a bridgehead east of the Brda river, inflicted massive casualties on the Polish Pomorska Cavalry Brigade (described by William L. Shirer as "sickening evidence of the carnage" and "symbolic of the brief Polish campaign"), prevented attempts by the Polish 9th Infantry Division and the Czersk Operational Group to recapture the Brda's east bank, was visited at the front by Adolf Hitler, Heinrich Himmler, and Erwin Rommel, and suffered casualties of 150 fatalities and 700 wounded. Moved to operating east of the Vistula in support of the 3rd Army's left flank after the Battle of Różan, they were positioned to join in attacking Warsaw from the north but were hampered by the slow progress of Army Group South. Von Bock instructed Guderian to set his sights onto Brest-Litovsk, deep in the Polish rear. Miscommunications with the infantry-based XXI Army Corps caused casualties and risked them being encircled by Polish forces. The Battle of Brest-Litovsk followed soon after, with XIX Army Corps troops slowed but emerging victorious. After the Soviet invasion of Poland, XIX Army Corps yielded control of the city to the Red Army, in line with the Molotov–Ribbentrop Pact, which they had unknowingly violated. XIX Army Corps then represented Germany in the subsequent German–Soviet military parade in Brest-Litovsk. The unit received several commendations after the Polish campaign ended on 6 October, with Guderian himself awarded the Knight's Cross of the Iron Cross on 27 October.

The XIX Army Corps was reorganized into the Western Campaign in May 1940, containing three Panzer Divisions. The 1st Panzer Division under Friedrich Kirchner, the 2nd Panzer Division under Rudolf Veiel, the 10th Panzer Division under Ferdinand Schaal, and the Infantry Regiment Großdeutschland joined the XIX Army Corps, now under the command of Panzer Group Kleist. The XIX Army Corps became part of the German effort to trap the Allied troops with an attack through the Ardennes forest, devised by Erich von Manstein known as the sickle cut. The XIX Army Corps crossed into Luxembourg on 10 May, and progressed through southern Belgium supported by the German Third Air Fleet. Then Battle of Sedan was won by 15 May 1940 by the Germans, despite heavy losses to the French Char B1 bis tanks. The XIX Army Corps established a bridgehead on the Meuse, which allowed them to attack northward to the English Channel, and later southward to encircle Allied armies deployed in Belgium and the French forces along the Maginot Line. On 20 May, Amiens had been captured by 1st Panzer Division, to complete the XIX Army Corps' march to the English Channel. Germany won the Battle of Arras on the next day, which led the Allies to evacuate towards Calais and Dunkirk. XIX Army Corps continued northwards on 22 May then were reinforced by the XIV Army Corps, and began the Siege of Calais on 24 May. A victory on 26 May saw XIX Army Corps take 20,000 Allied soldiers as prisoners of war, and the onset of the Battle of Dunkirk. Two days later soldiers of Leibstandarte killed 80 men of British 144th Infantry Brigade in the Wormhout massacre. The ensuing victory at Dunkirk ended the northward campaign of the XIX Army Corps on 29 May. On 1 June, Guderian was assigned to command Panzergruppe Guderian, taking most of the XIX Army Corps staff with him, and were joined by the XLI Corps and the XXXIX Corps, and became part of the 12th Army. Panzergruppe Guderian were redeployed southwards, commencing battle on 10 June. German tanks advanced quickly southward, and only met French resistance in forests and villages. Philippe Pétain became leader of France on 16 June, began negotiating for a ceasefire with the Germans. A day later, the 29th Infantry Division reached the border of Switzerland, effectively encircling Allied soldiers on the Maginot Line. The XIX Army Corps campaign ended on 22 June, with the establishment of Vichy France. During its campaigns, the XIX Army Corps and Panzergruppe Guderian captured 250,000 prisoners.

== Creation ==
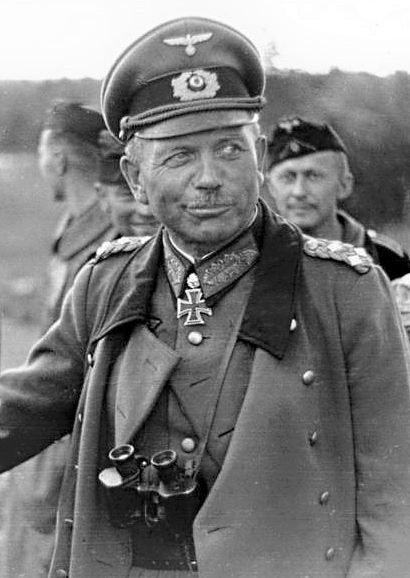
Heinz Guderian

The XIX Army Corps was formed on 1 July 1939 in Vienna to group together the 2nd Panzer Division and the 4th Light Division, the latter of which became 9th Panzer Division on 3 January 1940. At its inception, the unit was not part of any particular Wehrkreis. The initial commander of XIX Army Corps was General der Panzertruppe (then equivalent to the rank of lieutenant general in the English-speaking world) Heinz Guderian. (Note: 3rd Panzer contained Kurt Guderian, the commander's second son, meaning the son served in the father's corps. Guderian's older son, Kurt's brother Heinz Günther Guderian, the eventual inspector of panzer troops in the West German Bundeswehr, was also a panzer soldier, but served with the 4th Panzer Division, part of 10th Army of Army Group South.) Guderian had previously made a name for himself as a supporter of a motorized style of warfare using armored vehicles and air support, a style that is often dubbed Blitzkrieg ('lightning warfare') in the English-speaking world, although German military officers like Guderian did not themselves use that term. He also had previous experience as a panzer leader in the context of bloodless invasion, as he was involved in guiding German panzer forces, specifically 2nd Panzer Division, through the Anschluss of Austria in March 1938. This was in spite of the fact that he had already officially been replaced as commander of that unit by Rudolf Veiel and was only ordered back to that post by Ludwig Beck for the purpose of the Anschluss. During that action, Guderian reported that more than 30% (70% according to Alfred Jodl) of German panzer forces malfunctioned.

== Operational history ==
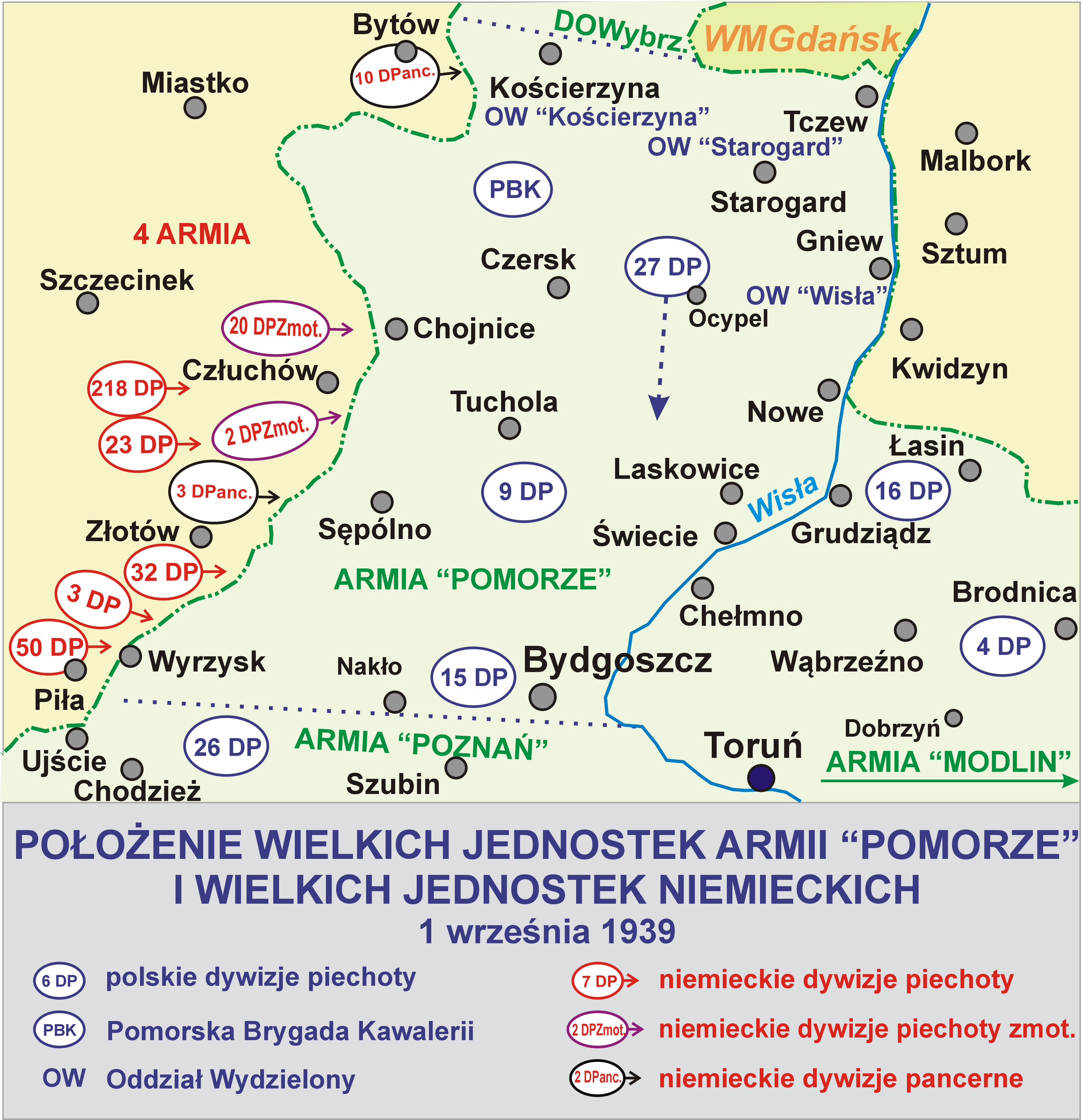
Initial positions of German 4th Army forces and the Polish defenders.

=== Poland campaign ===
==== Preparations ====
For the overall makeup of German forces in preparation for the Invasion of Poland, see also German order of battle for the invasion of Poland.

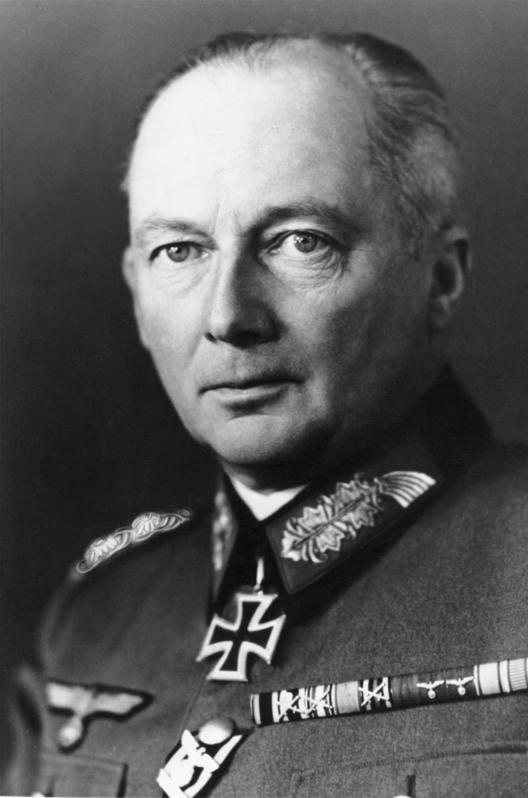
Günther von Kluge, commander of 4th Army that XIX Army Corps was a part of.

Guderian was informed of Hitler's decision to invade Poland through his superior, Günther von Kluge, commander of 4th Army, on 22 August 1939. He was ordered to Pomerania, where 4th Army and with it XIX Army Corps were stationed, to join the Befestigungsstab Pommern ('fortification staff Pomerania') and to officially construct military fortifications against a supposed Polish attack. Walther Nehring was assigned to be XIX Army Corps' chief of staff.

Germany's immediate preparations for the attack against its eastern neighbor had been ongoing since the Oberkommando der Wehrmacht issued the Directive for the Uniform Preparations of the Armed Forces for the War for 1939-40 between 3 April and 10 May 1939. The political background for the conflict goes quite a bit further. The signing of the Molotov–Ribbentrop Pact between Germany and the Soviet Union on 23 August 1939 created the immediate political prerequisites for Germany to launch its invasion.

See also Causes of World War II and Events preceding World War II in Europe.

During the Invasion of Poland, XIX Army Corps was part of 4th Army, which was itself subordinate to Fedor von Bock's Army Group North. 4th Army's task was to take Poland's north-western Danzig Corridor from Pomerania and to then unite with 3rd Army in East Prussia, commanded by Georg von Küchler. Inside 4th Army's overall military strategy, XIX Army Corps was to strike southwards towards the Vistula river and deny Polish troops to the west of it the retreat eastwards. XIX Army Corps had by then been expanded since its inception in July and now consisted of 3rd Panzer Division, 2nd Infantry Division and 20th Infantry Division.

3rd Panzer Division was also supported by Panzerlehrabteilung, a detachment that consisted of Panzer III and Panzer IV, which were at that point rarer in German tank divisions than their lighter Panzer I and Panzer II counterparts. Both the 2nd and the 20th Divisions were motorized, which was not at all standard amongst German infantry divisions. 3rd Panzer Division was the strongest of all German panzer divisions in the invasion, numbering 391 tanks out of the German overall of 3195.

Initially, the attack was planned to be launched on 26 August 1939, but in the night before the assault was to commence, the operation was abruptly cancelled due to diplomatic developments, causing a brief uncertainty whether the military campaign would take place at all.

However, on 31 August 1939, the troops were once more called to action for the following day, 1 September 1939, and this time the order went through as planned, and World War II began in Europe. This decision was given out the day before in a document signed personally by Adolf Hitler, titled Weisung Nr. 1 für die Kriegsführung ('Directive No. 1 for the Conduct of the War'), justifying the war as the result of the exhaustion of political means and setting the day and time of attack to 04:45 on 1 September 1939.

==== Action at Tuchola Forest (1–5 September 1939) ====
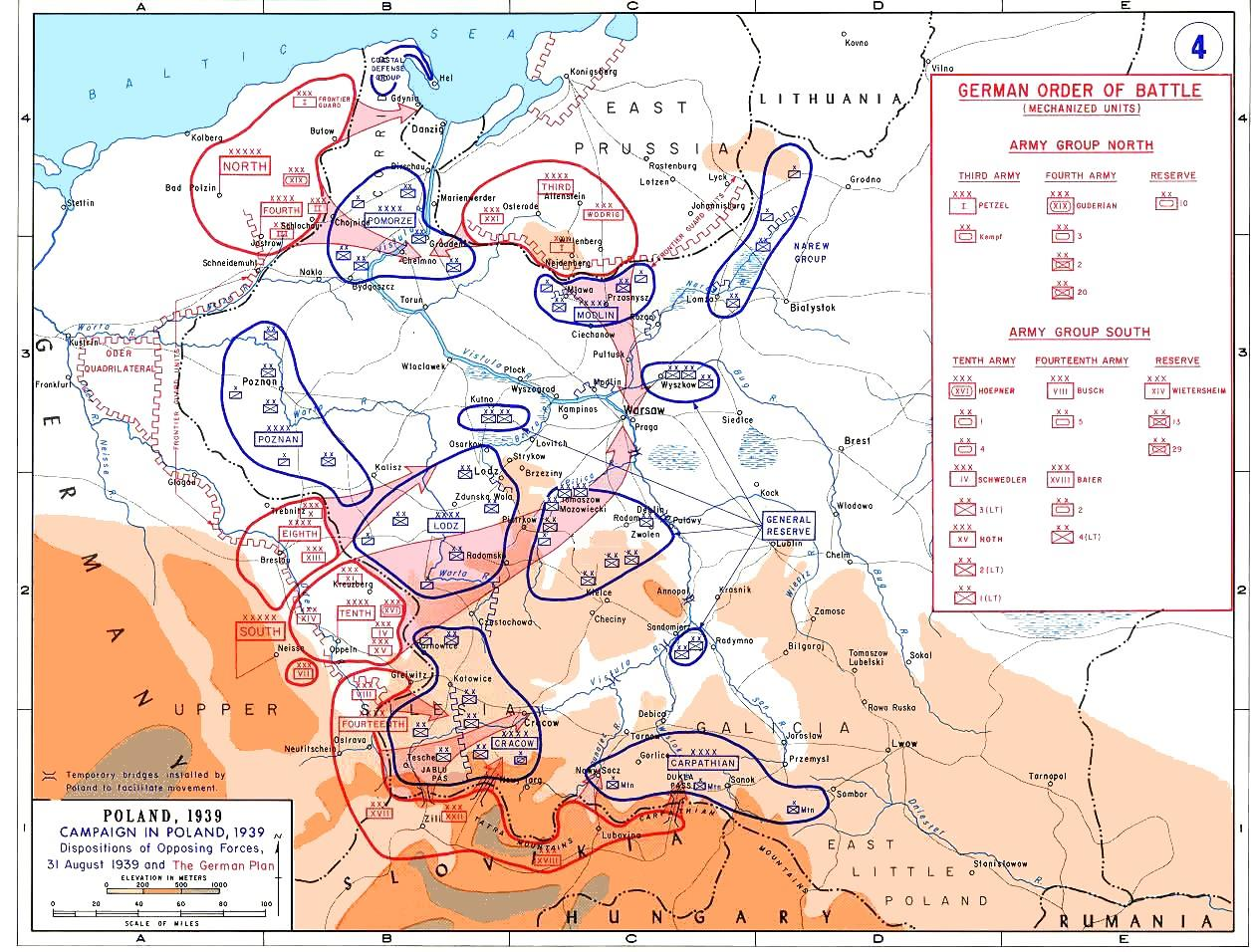
German Order of Battle for 1 September 1939, "Fall Weiss". XIX Army Corps can be seen in the northwest of the map, in Pomerania, as part of 4th Army.

XIX Army Corps saw initial action on the first day of the invasion, 1 September 1939. Although the Polish military had been aware of the German troop concentrations, the Germans were nevertheless able to seize the initiative with a surprise attack. Polish mobilization was not yet completed. While the Germans had a considerable manpower advantage as well (~1.5 million versus ~1 million), the main German military advantage were the numerical superiority in terms of equipment, including armored vehicles, field guns and military aircraft. Precise numbers are difficult to come by for the only partially mobilized and bureaucratically ill-prepared Polish defenders.

Guderian personally accompanied 3rd Panzer Brigade into action in heavy fog, including an incident where he fell under friendly fire by the artillery of 3rd Panzer Division. By 09:45, the XIX Army Corps was advancing along the railway line from then-German Sępólno Krajeńskie (Zempelburg) to Chojnice. The Army Corps saw its first notable engagement with the enemy north of Sępólno Krajeńskie when the German panzers were surprised by the sudden dissipation of the fog and subsequently found themselves opposite Polish anti-tank units. Ten German soldiers were killed. By the evening of 1 September 1939, XIX Army Corps had with its 3rd Panzer Division advanced through the city of Pruszcz and captured a bridgehead east of the river Brda.

20th Infantry Division, commanded by Mauritz von Wiktorin, was involved in two notable battles on that day: at the Charge at Krojanty, the Polish 18th Pomeranian Uhlans charged units of the 76th Infantry Regiment on horseback and were then dispersed by German armored cars, birthing the Nazi propaganda myth of Polish cavalry charging German tanks. The leader of the Polish unit, Kazimierz Mastalerz, was killed in action during that engagement.

On the same day, Wiktorin's 20th Infantry Division also fought the Battle of Chojnice and, bypassing Chojnice, captured Nowa Cerkiew. In the report by Army Group North command at 23:45, it was reported that most of the army group did not meet significant enemy resistance for most of the day, but that Polish presence strengthened in the sector of 4th Army against XIX Army Corps along the Osa river.

On 2 September, the German forces gained a river crossing northeast of Chojnice, threatening to encircle the city and prompting Polish counter-attacks (see also Battle of Tuchola Forest).

On the following day, September 3, 20 Infantry Division and 3rd Panzer Division had the support of 23rd Infantry Division to successfully encircle Polish infantry units in the forested battlefields. The Polish Pomorska Cavalry Brigade suffered massive casualties in the fight against 3rd Panzer Division. (Note: Guderian in his memoirs repeats the Nazi Propaganda myth of Polish cavalry attacking German tanks with lances. Any large-scale occurrence of such incidents has been debunked.) American writer and journalist William L. Shirer visited the site of the skirmishes between the Pomorska Brigade and XIX Army Corps a few days later, describing it as "sickening evidence of the carnage" and "symbolic of the brief Polish campaign".

By 5 September, XIX Army Corps had broken the enemy resistance and thwarted the attempts of the Polish 9th Infantry Division and the Czersk Operational Group to recapture the Brda's east bank and force the Germans back across the river. The Polish 9th Division was almost completely destroyed as only 35th Infantry Regiment remained a cohesive unit. The Germans captured 100 heavy guns and took 16,000 prisoners. On 5 September, the corps was visited by Adolf Hitler and his entourage, including Heinrich Himmler and Erwin Rommel, at the front. Hitler inquired about the casualties suffered at that point in the campaign, to which Guderian reported 150 fatalities and 700 wounded.

==== Wizna and Brest-Litovsk (6–16 September 1939) ====
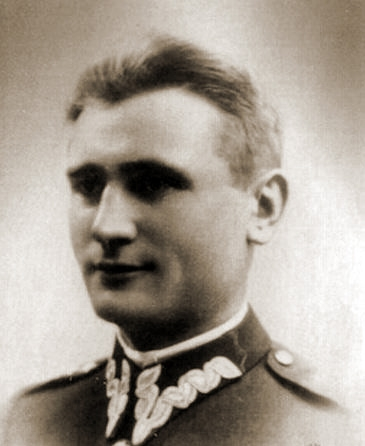
Władysław Raginis (1908–1939), Polish commander during the Battle of Wizna.

With the victory at Tuchola Forest, the Danzig Corridor was broken through and the 3rd and 4th Armies could connect. XIX Army Corps now moved some 70 kilometers east, towards Kwidzyn, whereas 218th Infantry Division was called up from Army Group North's reserves to continue to fight the remaining Polish resistance in the Tuchola Forest. With that redeployment, XIX Army Corps, now operating east of the Vistula, was to cover the left flank of Von Küchler's 3rd Army. Küchler's forces had their main strength concentrated in the Nidzica-Wielbark area and had been met with fierce resistance by well-entrenched Polish defenders of the Modlin Army who benefitted from the swamps and forests north of Mława and Przasnysz. The Polish defensive line was taken on 6 September, crossing the Narew river at Różan (See also Battle of Różan). The 3rd and 4th Armies were now to line up along the Vistula river to strike at Warsaw from the north.

The advances made by the two German armies now threatened to encircle the Polish Modlin Army from both sides, but the Modlin Army was forced to hold the line to stop the Germans from reaching Warsaw too quickly and in order to keep the retreat routes for Polish units further east open – Army Poznan especially, which had been positioned the furthest west out of any Polish army and which, although not under any major German attack, now had to scramble to fall back in line and close ranks with the retreating Pomorze Army and Lodz Army.

From southern East Prussia, XIX Army Corps prepared to advance on Brest-Litovsk (Polish: Brześć Litewski) with the support of 10th Panzer Division from Army Group North's reserves. They met the bitter resistance of some 700 to 1,000 Polish soldiers under leadership of Władysław Raginis, who managed to slow some 40,000 Germans down for three days at the Battle of Wizna. Multiple lines of bunkers were valiantly defended by the Polish soldiers, and it took the Germans careful maneuvering and a slow advance to eliminate the threat. Guderian refers to this battle as the Bunkerkampf bei Wizna, 'bunker combat near Wizna'. Raginis, the Polish commander, was killed in action on 10 September 1939 when he committed suicide with a hand grenade after giving his subordinates the order to surrender to the Germans.

On 8 September, orders from OKH reached Guderian that XIX Army Corps was to continue its operation more conservatively, to stay close by 3rd Army's left flank and to not wander off too far to the east – incursions east of the line between Ostrów Mazowiecka and Warsaw were outright forbidden. Guderian and his superior, Army Group North's commander Fedor von Bock, protested against this restriction on the mobile forces. It turned out that Gerd von Rundstedt's Army Group South was not progressing nearly as swiftly as Army Group North had anticipated; the southern forces, far stronger than their northern counterpart, had failed to cross the Vistula on any meaningful scale and had not yet conquered Warsaw. The southern armored divisions had met rougher hardships than Guderian's own units. 4th Panzer Division of XVI Corps within 10th Army had for example lost 57 out of 120 tanks, almost meeting a 50% casualty rate.

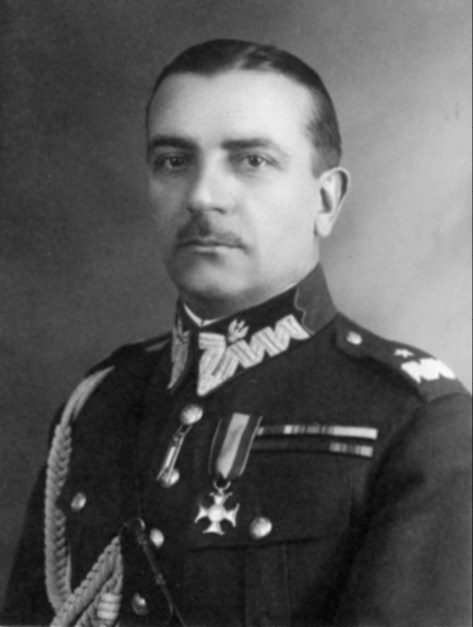
Konstanty Plisowski (1890–1940), Polish commander during the Battle of Brześć Litewski of 14 September 1939, around 1930.

With the threat of a Polish counter-offensive along the river Bzura, Fedor von Bock convinced OKH to allow XIX Army Corps to operate at its own pace on 3rd Army's left flank. Once more, Von Bock instructed Guderian to set his sights onto Brest-Litvosk, far east of the line between Ostrów and Warsaw previously given by OKH and deep in the Polish rear. Miscommunications with the infantry-based XXI Army Corps during their Narew crossing caused casualties; German infantry units, if unsupported by armored or air forces, had great trouble overcoming well-entrenched Polish defenders.

On 12 September, XIX Army Corps was for the first time itself threatened by enemy encirclement. The remains of the battered Polish Narew Operational Groups, supported by the Podlaska Cavalry Brigade, were now in XIX Army Corps' left rear, in the Grodno and Białystok areas. Guderian made a crucial tactical error when he moved the corps HQ across the river Narew too prematurely on 10 September, which made it difficult for the rest of his staff to fulfill their tasks. Several of the roads in the area had not yet been secured by German infantry units that served as the armor's rear guard and were thus still in Polish hands. Guderian himself had to be evacuated out of the area by German motorcyclists to avoid capture by the Polish forces.

XIX Army Corps reached Brest-Litovsk on 14 September 1939. The Battle of Brest-Litovsk between 14 September and 17 September 1939 saw the corps and 10th Panzer Division pitted against Konstanty Plisowski's Brześć defense group, a small token force using outdated FT-17 tanks. This obstacle too the XIX Army Corps overcame after some three days of delay actions by the Polish defenders. Plisowski's Polish soldiers, just like Raginis' units at Wizna, slowed down XIX Army Corps in spite of the crushing numerical and technological advantages on the German side. Plisowski abandoned the city near the end of the battle and retreated to other Polish lines. He would end up a Soviet POW and was eventually murdered in the Katyn massacre.

==== The "German-Soviet parade" and the conclusion of the campaign (17 September – 6 October 1939) ====
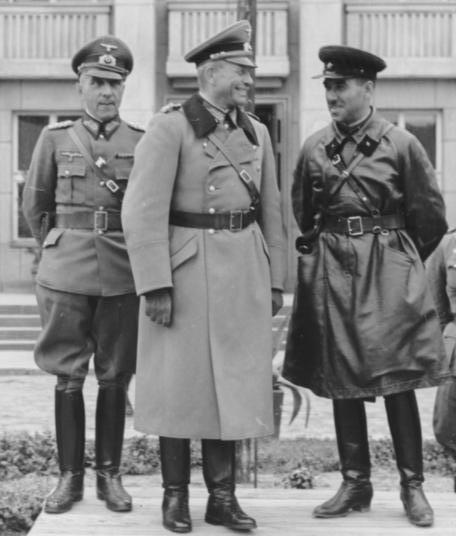
22 September 1939. From left to right: Mauritz von Wiktorin, Heinz Guderian, Semyon Krivoshein.

On 17 September, the Soviet invasion of Poland began, as had been previously agreed upon in secret as part of the Molotov–Ribbentrop Pact of 23 August.

XIX Army Group ceded Brest-Litowsk to the Red Army, as it was on the Soviet side on the country's division that the two nations had agreed to. Guderian had not been aware of the exact location of the demarcation line ahead of time and had thus unknowingly violated the treaty between Germany and the Soviet Union. XIX Army Corps was given until September 22 to vacate the area and cede control to the Soviets.

XIX Army Corps then represented Germany in the subsequent German–Soviet military parade in Brest-Litovsk. The name "military parade" for this incident should not be misinterpreted: while Guderian had offered a joint parade to Semyon Krivoshein, (Note: Krivoshein is spelt 'Kriwoschein' in German-language sources.) the commander of the Soviet 29th Light Tank Brigade, Krivoshein had declined a full parade (citing the exhaustion of his soldiers as a reason). He instead chose to offer a Soviet military band to accompany the German parade exiting the city. The two commanders agreed to watch the exit of the German troops together, where they, together with Mauritz von Wiktorin, became the subjects of a famous photograph.

Both Guderian and Krivoshein spoke French and could communicate with one another.

==== After the campaign ====
After the conclusion of the campaign on October 6, the leadership of XIX Army Corps received several commendations for their service; Guderian was awarded the Knight's Cross of the Iron Cross on 27 October 1939.

The campaign had revealed more than ever the glaring weaknesses of the Panzer I and Panzer II tank models that were at that point still in use in the Wehrmacht, including XIX Army Corps.

Our conversation then transitioned to technical matters. Hitler inquired what aspects about our tanks had proven themselves and what aspects needed improvements. I explained that it was essential to get Panzer III and Panzer IV to the front at an accelerated speed and to increase the production of these models. For future developments it should be kept in mind that speed was sufficient, but that it was important to strengthen the armor, especially in the front, and to increase the range and piercing of the guns, thus larger barrels and projectiles with bigger loads. Same thing held true for the anti-tank guns.

— Heinz Guderian – Erinnerungen eines Soldaten, p. 65

=== Western campaign ===
==== Preparations ====
For the 1940 campaign against France and the Low Countries, the armored forces of the Wehrmacht had been reorganized. The four 'Light Divisions' that had operated during the Polish campaign had proven themselves too weak and were converted into full-strength Panzer Divisions. XIX Army Corps now contained three Panzer Divisions, 1st Panzer Division under Friedrich Kirchner, 2nd Panzer Division under Rudolf Veiel, and 10th Panzer Division under Ferdinand Schaal. These units were joined by Infantry Regiment Großdeutschland to complete XIX Army Corps. None of the units that had been part of the corps during the Invasion of Poland - 3rd Panzer as well as 2nd and 20th Infantry - were still part of the Army Corps.

The Corps had been transferred from its previous command structure inside 4th Army to Panzer Group Kleist, the later 1st Panzer Army. XIX Army Corps was part of the effort to trap the Allied troops with a strong attack through the Ardennes forest, a plan devised by Erich von Manstein with consultation from Guderian in November 1939.

One day in November, [Erich von] Manstein asked me to see him and offered his thoughts on a strong panzer attack through Luxembourg and southern Belgium against the extended Maginot Line at Sedan, to pierce that fortified front and to then complete the breakthrough through the French frontline. He asked me for an evaluation of his suggestion from the standpoint of a panzer man. After extended study of maps in combination with my own knowledge of this terrain from World War 1 I could give Manstein the assurance that the operation he envisioned could in fact be realistically executed. The only condition I had to offer was that a sufficient amount of armoured and motorized divisions was to be assigned to this plan - preferably all of them!

— Heinz Guderian – Erinnerungen eines Soldaten, p. 79

This excerpt from Erinnerungen eines Soldaten implies immediate approval for Manstein's sickle cut idea on Guderian's part, whereas Manstein in his own memoirs suggests that Guderian at first had reservations about the suggestion.

Only when I had briefed [Guderian] on our Army Group's operational motives for seeking to shift the main weight of the entire offensive to the southern wing and drawn his attention to the alluring target of the Somme estuary in the enemy's rear did Guderian show unbounded enthusiasm for our plan. Ultimately it was his elan which inspired our tanks on their dash round the backs of the enemy to the Channel coast. For me, of course, it was a great relief to know that my idea of pushing large numbers of tanks through such difficult country as the Ardennes was considered feasible by Guderian.

— Erich von Manstein – Verlorene Siege, p. 64

Whatever Guderian's initial level of enthusiasm for Manstein's operational plan, he became supportive of the idea from November onwards, whereas much of the German supreme command did not initially share either man's optimism for the sickle cut. Manstein, previously chief-of-staff for Army Group South, was replaced by Georg von Sodenstern and himself shipped off by Franz Halder, chief of Oberkommando des Heeres between 1938 and 1942, to command XXXVIII Army Corps, a newly formed corps that consisted of third wave recruits. According to Guderian, it took until wargames in February 1940 for the idea to be seriously considered once again.

Preparations for the Western Campaign

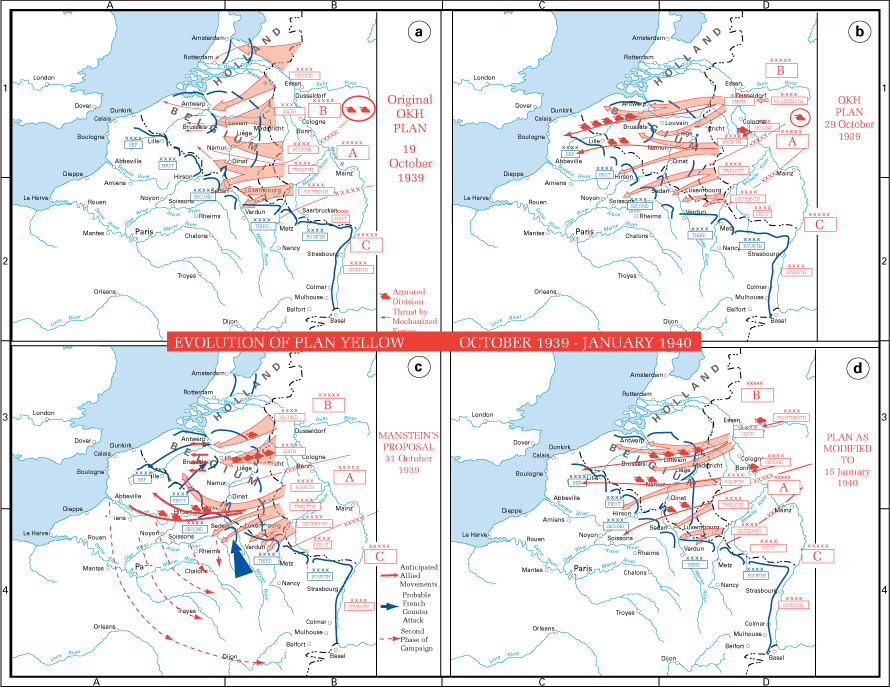
Evolution of "Case Yellow" through multiple iterations of planning.

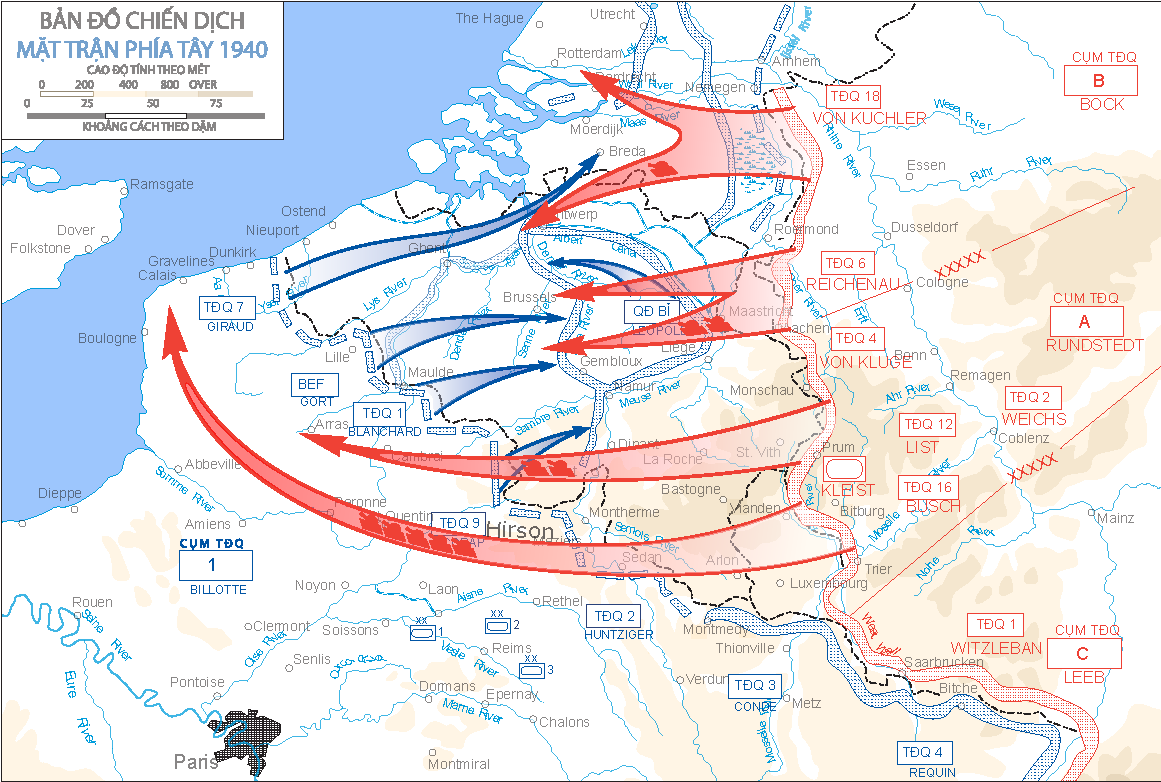
Juxtaposition of the German sickle cut and the Allied Dyle Plan.

The commanders of Army Group A, which XIX Army Corps was a part of, met on 15 March 1940 to discuss finalized operational goals. By now, Manstein's idea had been approved, and it thus became Guderian's task to cross the border to Luxembourg, advance towards southern Belgium and then Sedan, to cross the Meuse at Sedan and to erect a bridgehead of the river's left bank. Guderian estimated that he would reach the river on the fourth day of the operation and attack across the river on the fifth. XIX Army Corps would be one of two major armored corps, the other being XIV Army Corps under Gustav Anton von Wietersheim, as had been envisioned by Manstein.

In a secret command document of 7 November 1944, the German inspector-general of panzer forces is given the following recapitulation of the preparations for Case Yellow:

- 10 Panzer Divisions, numbered 1st to 10th, took part in the western campaign.
- Of these, three, according to the document (Note: Four Light Divisions participated in the Poland Campaign: 1st Light Division (became 6th Panzer Division), 2nd Light Division (became 7th Panzer Division), 3rd Light Division (became 8th Panzer Division), 4th Light Division (became 9th Panzer Division). In the document, the author appears to count 9th Panzer separately from the others and only points 6th, 7th and 8th Panzer Divisions out as "former Light Divisions". It is unclear whether this is a mistake or on purpose, but it is likely caused by the fact that 9th Panzer Division received slightly different equipment from the other three former Light Divisions.) [in reality four, 6th through 9th], had been Light Divisions during the Poland Campaign.
- The Divisions were subdivided as follows:
  - 1st through 5th and 10th Panzer Divisions were equipped with two Panzer Regiments each. Each of the Panzer Regiments was equipped with two Panzer Detachments each. These detachments contained German tank models.
  - 9th Panzer Division was equipped with a single Panzer Regiment. This regiment contained two Panzer Detachments. These detachments contained German tank models.
  - 6th, 7th and 8th Panzer Divisions were equipped with a single Panzer Regiment each. These regiments contained three Panzer Detachments. These detachments contained Czechoslovak tank models.
- Counting all vehicles among all Panzer Divisions, the following tanks participated in the invasion (2,574 in total):
  - 523 Panzer I
  - 955 Panzer II
  - 349 Panzer III
  - 278 Panzer IV
  - 106 Panzer 35(t)
  - 228 Panzer 38(t)
  - 96 Sd.Kfz. 265 Panzerbefehlswagen
  - 39 Panzerbefehlswagen III

Guderian and the staff of XIX Army Corps was called into position at their initial headquarters at Bitburg on 9 May 1940 at 13:30. Guderian reached the troops by the evening and had them assemble along the border to Luxembourg, taking positions between Vianden and Echternach. The invasion was to start the next day. The first major operational target for XIX Army Corps would be Sedan, France. Karl-Heinz Frieser identifies the Sedan sector under X Corps (Pierre-Paul-Jacques Grandsard) on the left flank of the French 2nd Army as the weakest part of the defensive line. Charles Huntziger, commander-in-chief of the French 2nd Army, said as late as 7 May 1940 that he did not believe "that the Germans will ever consider attacking in the region of Sedan".

In fact, almost no French leader or politician foresaw the potential threat that was a German attack on the position of Sedan. The sector was the 'hinge' between the mobile parts of the Allied armies that were to be deployed in Belgium and the fixed French forces along the Maginot Line. Among the very few French political leaders to recognize the imminent danger was Pierre Taittinger, who visited the sector in March 1940 and found the defensive preparations inadequate.

In this region [Sedan sector], we are entirely too much taken with the idea that the Ardennes woods and the Meuse River will shield Sedan and we assign entirely too much significance to these natural obstacles. The defenses in this sector are rudimentary, not to say embryonic.

— Pierre Taittinger in a report to Edouard Daladier, 21 March 1940, Karl-Heinz Frieser (2013): The Blitzkrieg Legend

==== 10 May 1940 ====
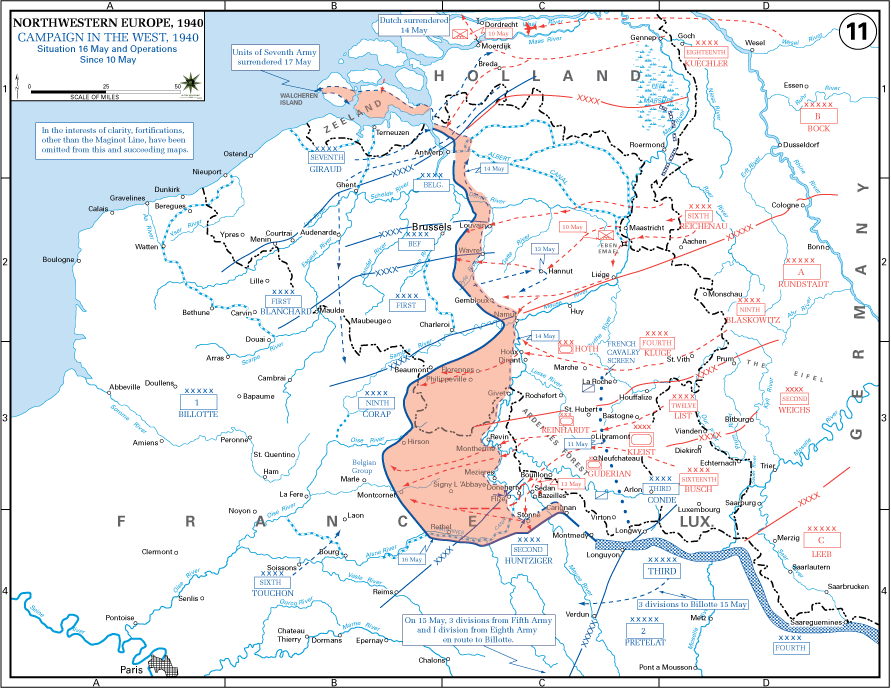
Western Campaign: 10–16 May 1940

The attack began at 05:35 on 10 May 1940. Guderian personally attended the attack alongside 1st Panzer Division against Wallendorf in Luxembourg. Luxembourg, which had only maintained a token military force, was quickly overwhelmed, and 1st Panzer Division reached the Belgian border at Martelange by the afternoon. Großdeutschland had undertaken a paradrop mission on the other side of the Belgian border to gain a headstart on the armored units, but 1st Panzer Division caught up on the first day. 10th Panzer Division attacked towards Habay-la-Neuve and was opposed by the quick response of the French 3rd Colonial Infantry Division, although the 3rd Colonial did not manage to significantly impede the 10th Panzer's advance.

At 14:00, Halder notes in his diary that "Group Kleist seems to be getting on well". At 20:00, he makes an entry stating that "all Corps of [Army Group A] have well closed to Kleist".

In the night from May 10 to May 11, Panzer Group Kleist's command warned of a possible French cavalry counter-attack and asked for 10th Panzer Division to be partially pulled back and turned towards Longwy to cover the panzer group's left. Guderian asked for the order to be rescinded, fearing a temporary loss of a third of his strength, and Von Kleist eventually relented. The cavalry attack did not occur. Throughout the campaign towards the Meuse, XIX Army Corps was heavily supported by the German Third Air Fleet, which struck at French troop movements, infrastructure, railroad and rear guard communications at an exceptional operational depth of on average 76 kilometers per sortie.

==== 11 May 1940 ====
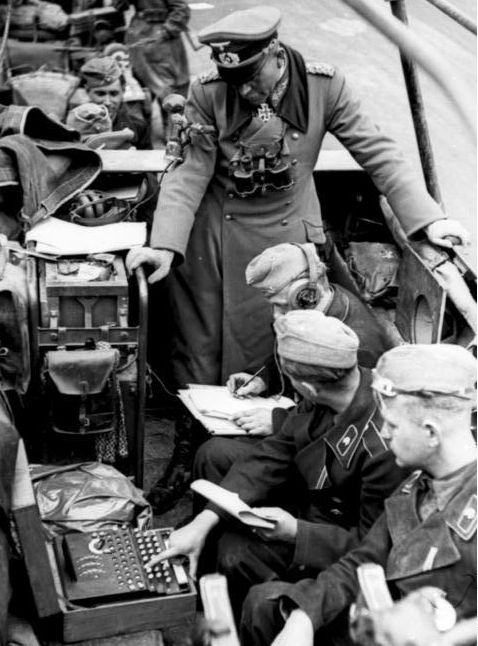
Guderian in his command vehicle during the western campaign. Note the Enigma machine at the bottom left.

On the 11th, extensive minesweeping operations had to be undertaken to enable 1st Panzer Division to advance further into Belgium. The division continued its march around noon, and attacked Neufchâteau, a fortified town defended by French cavalry and Belgian Chasseurs Ardennais. The defenders were routed, and 1st Panzer Division pursued them to Bouillon, taking Bertrix on the way. 2nd Panzer Division took Libramont, whereas 10th Panzer continued its attack on Habay-la-Neuve, suffering notable casualties. Rifle Regiment 69 lost its commander, Oberstleutnant Ehlermann, who was killed in action at Sainte Marie.

At 11:00, Halder notes in his war diary that Allied forces are approaching the line Libramont-Neufchâteau-Tintigny opposite to XIX Army Corps. In the evening, the corps leadership gave a renewed Korpsbefehl ('corps order') for the following day, recognizing the forces' advance against a "brave and cleverly fighting enemy" and designating the crossing of the Semois river as the immediate operational objective for the following day, 12 May.

==== 12 May 1940 ====
The defenders of Bouillon were driven out by Rifle Regiment 1 on the early morning of May 12. Bouillon was the last major settlement before Sedan in France and thus the crossing of the Meuse river, the operation's early objective. The 1st Panzer Division attempted to bypass Sedan by crossing part of its units over the river outside of the town. For that purpose, pontoon bridged were erected over the course of May 12, drawing the attention of Allied air units. Although the 1st Panzer Divisions was bombed from the air, the pontoon bridge stayed intact. 10th Panzer Division was fighting on the other side of the forest between Cugnon and Herbeumont, attacking Allied forest fortifications. These were captured over the course of 12 May and 10th Panzer was free to continue towards Bazeilles. At this point, XIX Army Corps had become a prime target for Allied bombardment, as its crossing of the Meuse river would establish a deadly bridgehead for German reinforcements to quickly overrun the Belgian defenses. Guderian moved his staff's headquarters twice on 12 May alone because of Allied bombings, first from Hotel Panorama in the Semois river valley to a smaller hotel north of Bouillon, then from that hotel to the village Bellevaux-Noirefontaine. It was in Bellevaux that Guderian received word from Von Kleist to prepare for a major Meuse crossing for 16:00 the following day, 13 May 1940. Although 2nd Panzer Division wasn't in an ideal position to attack yet, the attack commenced in accordance to the planned timeframe.

On the evening of 12 May, 1st and 10th Panzer were ready at the northern bank of the Meuse river and had taken the part of Sedan north of the river (see also Battle of Sedan). The French defenses in the area had been weak prior to the invasion: the Maginot Line ended some 20 kilometers to the east of Sedan at Fort No. 505 at La Ferté and only the French 55th Infantry Division was assigned to this sector.

1st Panzer Division was assigned with the heaviest available artillery for the main assault the following day, whereas 2nd and 10th would receive only light artillery support. The units assigned to 1st Panzer Division included Artillery Regiment 73, Artillery Regiment 49, three artillery battalions from the corps reserves as well as the 3rd [Heavy] Battalion of Artillery Regiment 74 and the 3rd [Heavy] Battalion of Artillery Regiment 90. The lighter battalions of Artillery Regiments 74 and 90 were to remain with 2nd and 10th Panzer Divisions respectively. On the evening of 12 May, yet another Korpsbefehl was given out, informing the officers that Luftwaffe capacities had been freed up over Belgian airspace and would be used to support Panzer Group Kleist in the hugely important Meuse crossing the following day, 13 May 1940.

==== 13 May 1940 ====
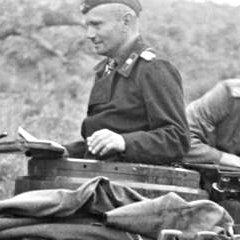
Hermann Balck, who served as an Oberstleutnant with 1st Panzer Division during the Western Campaign, in 1941.

The operation began the following day under French artillery fire, which Guderian blames on an action by Von Kleist and Air Force General Hugo Sperrle which had taken away resources from anti-artillery actions. The final operational plan was given out just some seven hours and 45 minutes before the attack was to be carried out, in the form of Korpsbefehl Nr. 3. The attack was to be supported by eight hours of aerial bombardment at massive scale before the ground forces' attack, which was to be launched at 16:00. On the German right, 2nd Panzer Division was to advance across the Meuse river on both sides of Donchery and seize the heights on the south bank of the river. In the center, 1st Panzer Division would cross the river just west of Sedan and attack between Glaire and Torcy. On the left flank, 10th Panzer Division would cover 1st Panzer by securing eastern Sedan and moving southeast towards Bazeilles and then crossing the river between Sedan and Bazeilles. The operational plan was further specified at noon, with the Divisionsbefehl Nr. 5.

This 'division directive' further specified the tasks of three attack groups, the right attack group around 2nd Panzer Division, central attack group around 1st Panzer Division and the left attack group around 10th Panzer Division. It also gave precise timetables for artillery and air support missions and their targeted front sectors over the course of the day. In general, the artillery would shell the immediate river bank up until 16:00, but then move the bombardment further inland as the ground forces cross the river. At 16:00, under cover of the German air support, Rifle Regiment 1 was the first unit of 1st Panzer Division to cross the Meuse, accompanied by Großdeutschland. The German air support had silenced the French artillery, accelerating the operation.

By 23:00, Cheveuges was in the hands of the XIX Army Corps' advancing infantry formations. On their right flank, 2nd Panzer's Kraftradschützen and recon detachment had also crossed the Meuse. The German aerial bombardment in the specific sector of the Meuse crossing was some of the most intense ever witnessed. Hermann Balck, the later German general, at the time still in the rank of Oberstleutnant and commander of Rifle Regiment 1 in 1st Panzer Division, also offered the opinion that low quality French artillery divisions that were poorly camouflaged further aided the German aerial attacks. Balck also laid claim in an interview on 13 April 1979 to some personal responsibility for the ease of the German victory, as according to his interpretation, his previous river crossing training exercises with Rifle Regiment 1 over the Moselle river near Koblenz were decisive in enabling Rifle Regiment 1 to fulfill their amphibious task. Balck would also claim that it was his idea after the Battle of Sedan to mix armored and infantry units into mixed battle groups.

Balck would after the western campaign become a successful panzer commander of his own, even reaching command of Army Group G before redeployment to the Hungarian theater.

10th Panzer Division captured Wadelincourt by nightfall. By the evening (around 22:30), the corps leadership had given out a memorandum to the officers to inform them of the state of French defenses, which were mostly ineffective. The memorandum recognized that parts of all three Panzer Divisions had successfully crossed the Meuse.

==== 14 May 1940 ====
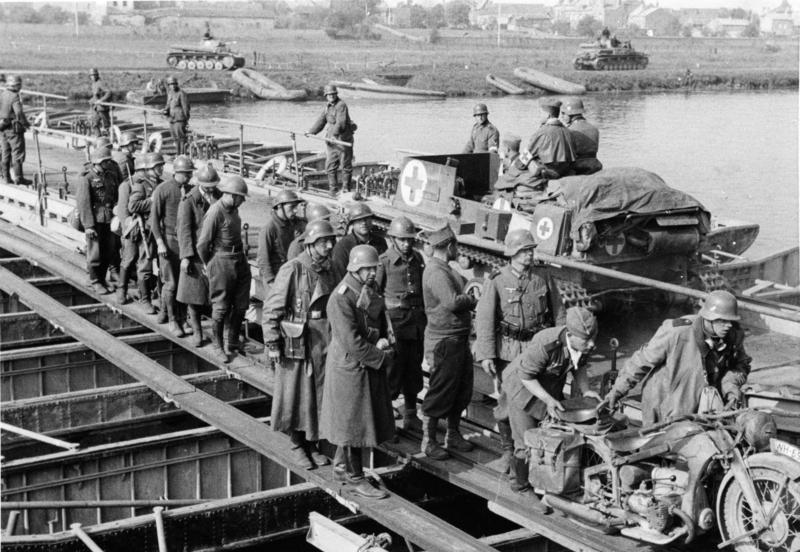
14 May 1940: Parts of 1st Panzer Regiment cross a pontoon bridge over the Meuse at Floing, near Sedan. Also pictured are French prisoners of war (in Adrian helmets).

On the 14th, the bulk of the heavy detachments of XIX Army Corps began crossing the Meuse river under the cover of the infantry and recon units holding the bridgeheads. 1st Panzer Division broke through to Chémery-sur-Bar in the early morning of May 14. XIX Army Corps took thousands of Allied soldiers POW in the process. Here, while holding a victory parade, 1st Panzer Division came under fire by friendly Luftwaffe pilots, who bombarded the German infantry in a friendly fire incident, causing several fatalities. When informed of a possible French counterattack with heavy tanks, Guderian accelerated the river crossing by XIX Army Corps' own tanks. 1st Panzer Division, including both 1st and 2nd Panzer Brigades, crossed near Floing and made an attack towards the Stonne heights, whereas 2nd Panzer Division crossed at Donchery.

The French armored attack was repelled at Bulson and Chémery and Bulson fell into the hands of Großdeutschland. 1st Panzer Brigade's attack towards Stonne primarily served to cover the river crossing of 2nd Panzer Brigade that was to immediately follow 1st Panzer Brigade's own disembarkment, but the Stonne heights were very important in the grand scheme as well - they could serve as an ideal staging ground for a well-organized Allied counter-attack towards the bridgeheads and thus had to be taken by the Germans before the French could formulate a successful reaction to the river crossing. Because of the ongoing river crossings of 1st, 2nd and 10th Panzer Divisions across the Meuse river, XIX Army Corps was a high-priority target for nearby Allied air forces.

Throughout the day, the German anti aircraft units scored 150 downed Allied aircraft. The regiment's commander, one Oberst Von Hippel, would later be awarded the Knight's Cross for the anti air unit's performance. Also on the 14th was visit by Army Group A's supreme commander, Gerd von Rundstedt, to XIX Army Corps.

1st and 2nd Panzer Divisions were to turn to their right after crossing the river to cross the vital Ardennes Canal. As most of the French units, although in retreat, were still on the eastern bank of the canal, this would mark XIX Army Corps' total breakthrough through the French army's line. XIX Army Corps operated in tight cooperation with XLI Army Corps (Note: In his "Erinnerungen eines Soldaten", Guderian sometimes refers to 41st Army Corps as XXXXI Corps and sometimes as XLI Corps. XLI Corps will be used throughout this article.) under the leadership of Georg-Hans Reinhardt, which had also forced its own initial Meuse crossing on 13 May. Both units reached the Ardennes Canal by evening, and 1st Panzer Division had mostly crossed it by nightfall, attacking Singly and Vendresse. 10th Panzer Division and Großdeutschland were tasked with attacking and then holding the Stonne heights. Hermann Balck also reported in a 1979 interview that after the Sedan breakthrough, a meeting between regimental and brigade commanders of 1st Panzer Brigade fell under friendly fire by Luftwaffe pilots, causing several fatalities. Balck himself was still en route to the meeting. While Balck reports that "an armored brigade commander and two regimental commanders have been killed", it is unclear what incident he refers to. At 21:00, the corps leadership gave out Korpsbefehl Nr. 5 to determine the operations for the following day. The 2nd Panzer Division on the left was instructed to advance over Boulzicourt, the 1st Panzer Division was to capture Singly, and the 10th Panzer Division, supported by Großdeutschland, would support and defend the corps' southern flank.

==== 15 May 1940 ====
Initial Attack by 10th Panzer Division against Stonne, 15 May at 08:00. The town would switch control seventeen times over two days.

On 15 May, 10th Panzer and Großdeutschland led a thrust into the Stonne heights to bring them under German control. Here, faced with nearly invulnerable Char B1 bis heavy tanks on the French sides that were not shaken by German anti-tank weaponry, the German units, especially Großdeutschland, took considerable casualties. Famously, the French tank ace Pierre Billotte drove his Char B1 bis into a German ambush intentionally, then destroyed two Panzer IVs, eleven Panzer IIIs and two anti-tank guns and was hit over 140 times, with not a single shot able to penetrate the heavy armor of his tank, nicknamed "Eure". In 10th Panzer's and Großdeutschland's back line, additional German forces could safely cross the Meuse, with 29th Infantry Division of 16th Army the first to arrive to reinforce 10th Panzer Division. During the night from the 15th to the 16th, Guderian protested against suggestions by Panzer Group Kleist's command staff to stop the advance and to focus on the bridgehead. Guderian feared a loss of momentum that would allow the Allies to regain their footing and formulate a viable defense. Rifle Regiment 1 of 1st Panzer Division faced off against a brigade of French Spahi light cavalry, which Hermann Balck cited as "the best troops [he] faced in both wars". The Spahi refused to surrender their entrenched position and almost all of them were killed.

==== 16 May 1940 ====
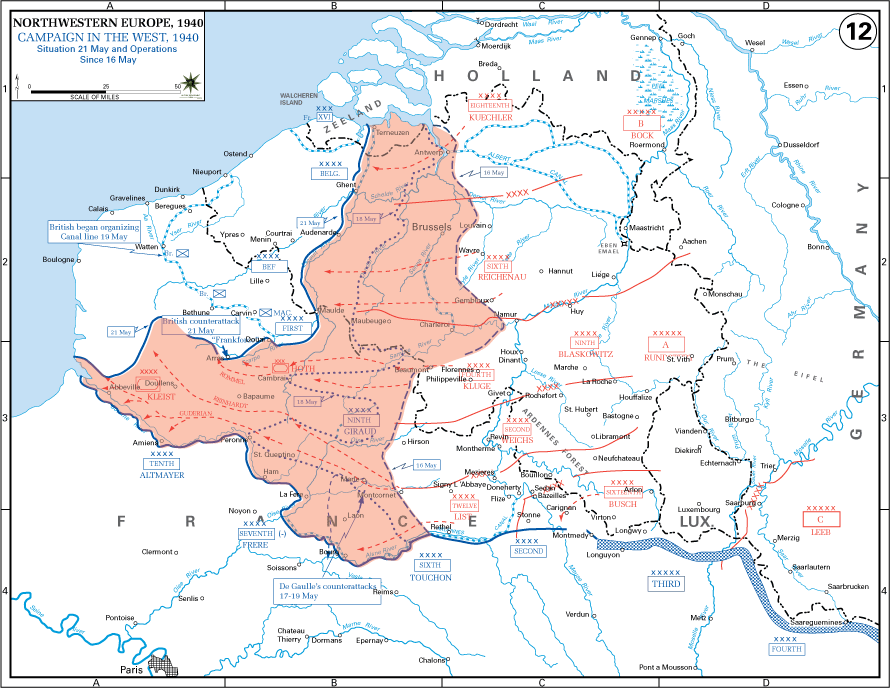
Western Campaign: 16–21 May 1940

On the 16th, 1st Panzer Division took Omont and Bouvellemont. Balck would be awarded the Knight's Cross for his ability to motivate his exhausted units to continue the assault on Bouvellemont. Guderian had his troops press on in spite of widespread exhaustion and forced the attack on Montcornet. Here, XIX Army Corps was temporarily strengthened by 6th Panzer Division (Werner Kempf) of XLI Corps, bringing the operational strength of the combined units back up to three panzer divisions and compensating for the loss of 10th Panzer Division, which was still undertaking rearguard action. Several hundred French soldiers were taken POW, including a detachment of the 4th Armored Division, a division then under command of Charles de Gaulle. By the evening of 16 May, Guderian was convinced that XIX Army Corps could finish the race to the English Channel starting the following day. The corps leadership gave out Korpsbefehl Nr. 7 for the following day. On XIX Army Corps' right, 2nd Panzer Division was to advance over Origny onto Ribemont, whereas 1st Panzer Division would march forward on the left, from Mézières towards Hamégicourt.

==== 17 May 1940 ====
Guderian was mistaken in his opinion: On 17 May, XIX Army Corps received orders from Von Kleist to stop the advance. Guderian was personally visited by Von Kleist at 07:00, and, in his version of the story in his memoirs, accused of ignoring supreme command orders, without Von Kleist considering the performance of XIX Army Corps soldiers in the field. Guderian then asked to be relieved of command, to which Von Kleist ordered he should request such a dismissal from Von Rundstedt, the commander of the army group. Upon doing so, Guderian was inversely instructed to remain in his post for the time being and to wait for Wilhelm List and his 12th Army. List arrived in the afternoon and fully reversed Von Kleist's suspension of Guderian. While this conflict of leadership was taking place, the soldiers of XIX Army Corps continued to fight in the field. 1st Panzer Division captured Ribemont and Crécy-sur-Serre, thus reaching the river Oise and its tributary, the Serre. 10th Panzer Division was at last freed from rearguard duty and rejoined the advance, taking Fraillicourt and Saulces-Monclin. On the evening of the 17th, a bridgehead on the other side of the Oise was established by vanguard units. It was also 17 May when the Battle of Stonne finally concluded with German victory - the town that had been contested since the morning hours of 15 May had changed owners seventeen times from the initial German victory at 08:00 on the 15th and was, at 17:45 on the 17th, at last in German hands permanently.

==== 18 May 1940 ====
Somme region: XIX Army Corps advanced into this area from the east. Saint-Quentin was captured on the 18th, Péronne on the 19th, Amiens and Abbeville on the 20th.

18 May began with a corps directive, Korpsbefehl Nr. 8, at 0:45 just after midnight. The directive warned the officers that most Somme crossings and bridges were in Allied hands and thus instructed a swift series of surprise attacks to quickly break the resistance at the bridgeheads. 2nd Panzer was to advance from Origny and Ribemont, force itself across the Somme on both sides of Morcourt and then swiftly take the heights between Villeret and Le Vergier. From there, it was to make a swift attack against Saint-Quentin, the most important city in the area. In the meantime, 1st Panzer would advance on 2nd Panzer's left from Bezieres and Hamegicourt, force the river crossing on both sides of Castres and then make a rapid advance towards the Poeuilly heights. 10th Panzer was to follow on the left rear of the corps, covering the flank of the other two divisions against possible Allied counter-attacks from the Laon area. 10th Panzer was also tasked with destroying dangerous bridges that might be used to support Allied counter-offensives.

Korpsbefehl Nr. 8 was immediately followed by Korpsbefehl Nr. 9 at 2:00, which outlined the operations for 19 May. During the executions of the orders outlined in Nr. 8, the 2nd Panzer Division reached Saint-Quentin at 09:00. The 1st Panzer Division crossed the Oise and started advancing towards Péronne on the other side of the river. 10th Panzer followed the other two divisions, also making towards Péronne. Franz Halder notes in his diary a report in the afternoon by Wilhelm Ritter von Thoma about the armored combat conducted by XIX Army Corps, noting that "the description of the lack of fighting hearts in the French is very striking".

==== 19 May 1940 ====
There, 1st Panzer Division captured a bridgehead on the other side of the Somme river the following day, on 19 May. Korpsbefehl Nr. 9 of two nights before (see paragraph above) had outlined the operational targets of 19 May and the Somme crossing, including a precise rundown of bridges to be destroyed by 10th Panzer Division, then stationed at Renansart, and designating target areas for air support. These were further elaborated on in a specific memorandum directed to the leadership of the 10th Panzer Division.

Tactically, Nr. 9 instructed 2nd Panzer Division to cross the canal between Équancourt and Manancourt to then seize the Le Mesnil heights. From there, a southern thrust was to cover 1st Panzer's advance; an advance that would take the division from its canal crossing at Moislains to the Rancourt heights. The Somme had large symbolic significance due to its importance during World War One, but the capture of Péronne also meant that the route towards Amiens in the south and Arras in the north and thus the last major French settlements (next to Abbeville) between the German lines and the English channel was now open. On the evening of the 19th, the XIX Army Corps had reached the line Cambrai-Péronne-Ham. 10th Panzer Division took the left flank to relieve the overstretched 1st Panzer Division, which had taken most of the offensive actions of the day. There, 10th Panzer would have to capture Corbie on the following day to support the XIX Army Corps' general assault on Amiens, the largest French city in the region. Once more, 10th Panzer Division was supported by the 29th Infantry Division in its defensive assignments.

In the closing hours of 19 May, the corps leadership drafted the operational plan for the following day, Korpsbefehl Nr. 10, dated to 24:00 (or 0:00 the following day). In this directive, the officers were warned that the Allied forces trapped in Belgium would attempt a breakout towards the southwest. To counteract this, XIX Army Corps was to continue its march on the northwestern course and reach the English Channel as well as the Somme estuary. XIX Army Corps would have its right flank covered by XLI Army Corps. The 2nd Panzer Division was to bypass Amiens in the south to focus on Abbeville in the north in order to cut off the Allied retreat route. In the meantime, 1st Panzer Division would engage Amiens from the east. 10th Panzer would have its current defensive duties taken over by 29th Infantry and could then advance onto 1st Panzer's starting position to resume defensive operations there.

==== 20 May 1940 ====
On 20 May 1940, 1st Panzer Division moved towards Amiens, whereas 2nd Panzer Division was to advance on the village of Albert, bypass Amiens in the north and attack Abbeville on the far right of the German lines. The three armored divisions were to subdivide the northern bank of the Somme as follows:

- 2nd Panzer Division in the north, between the Somme estuary to Flixecourt.
- 1st Panzer Division in the center, between Flixecourt and the estuary of the Avre tributary into the Somme, just southeast of Amiens, near Longueau.
- 10th Panzer Division in the south, between the Avre estuary and Péronne.

The attack of 1st Panzer Division against Amiens began around 08:45, even before the reinforcements of 10th Panzer could safely take the positions of 1st Panzer's defenders on the southern flank. In one particular incident, Rifle Regiment 1 abandoned its bridgehead to quickly join the attack on Amiens.

On the way [to the Amiens suburbs] I confirmed the presence of 10th Panzer Division in Péronne and received a drastic report of 1st Panzer Division's replacement. The bridgehead forces of 1st Panzer had moved away without waiting for the replacement's arrival, because commanding Oberstleutnant Balck [of Rifle Regiment 1] deemed the point of time for attack on Amiens more important than defending the bridgehead and didn't want to miss the moment. His successor, Oberst Landgraf, was very indignant about this recklessness and about Balck's answer to his concerns: "You retake the bridgehead then [if the French were to recapture it]. I had to conquer it as well, after all!"

— Heinz Guderian – Erinnerungen eines Soldaten, p. 100

For the action at Abbeville, see also Battle of Abbeville.

By noon of 20 May, Amiens had been captured by 1st Panzer Division. 2nd Panzer Division in the north was instructed to reach Abbeville by nightfall to at last complete the XIX Army Corps' march to the English Channel. By 19:00, 2nd Panzer was in position after an advance from Doullens. Guderian's staff suffered an incident of friendly fire during the day, wherein a German aircraft destroyed one of XIX Army Corps' new recon planes. In return, the anti aircraft guns shot down one of the German planes, forcing the pilots to evacuate with their parachutes. They were brought to Guderian for a stern talking-to, but no fatalities were suffered during the incident.

At 16:30, the corps leadership issued orders for a more defensive approach on both sides of the Somme, warning against Allied counter-attacks from both sides. 2nd Panzer Division was tasked with the defense of the river between Abbeville and the Nièvre estuary, 1st Panzer Division would be on guard between the Nièvre and Ancre estuaries, and 10th Panzer Divisions would guard from the Ancre estuary up to and including Peronné. During the evening's offensive actions, Abbeville was secured by midnight, and XIX Army Corps had thus cut through the Allied lines towards the English Channel, securing the southern flank of 3rd Panzer Division, 5th Panzer Division and 7th Panzer Division for the Battle of Arras on the following day and forcing the Allies to initiate evacuation actions at northern ports like Calais, Boulogne and Dunkirk.

Western Campaign: 21 May - 4 June 1940

==== 21 May 1940 ====
21 May was spent waiting for additional instructions after XIX Army Corps had fulfilled its main objective. This was decided on the previous day, with Korpsbefehl Nr. 11. The precise time of day of the order is marked as "?" in the addendum of Erinnerungen eines Soldaten and is thus unknown. Nr. 11 essentially reaffirmed Nr. 10 of 20 May at 16:30 (see above), meaning that it had to have been given some time between 16:30 and 24:00 on 20 May 1940. However, the directive purely served to once more affirm to the army corps to hold their position, just as Nr. 10 had previously established.

At the end of this memorable day [May 20], we didn't know in what direction to proceed the movements; not even Panzer Group Kleist had orders regarding the continuation of operations. May 21 was thus lost waiting for orders. I used the day to assess the occupation of the Somme bridgeheads and crossings and to visit Abbeville. On the way, I asked the men how they liked the operations so far. "Pretty good", an Austrian man of 2nd Panzer Division replied, "but we lost two days doing nothing". Sadly he was right.

— Heinz Guderian – Erinnerungen eines Soldaten, p. 101

On the evening of May 21, orders arrived from the German supreme command to advance north and to take the Channel ports. Guderian at that point intended to take 10th Panzer Division via Hesdin and Saint-Omer towards Dunkirk, whereas 2nd Panzer Division was to attack Boulogne-sur-Mer and 1st Panzer Division Calais, but this operation would be cut short by intervention from Panzer Group Kleist, which determined at 06:00 on 22 May to hold back 10th Panzer Division as part of the army's reserves. Before then, the corps leadership had given out the Vorläufiger Korpsbefehl Nr. 12 ('preliminary corps directive No. 12'), only to then, from the Panzer Group Kleist, receive Gruppenbefehl Nr. 12 ('group directive No. 12') (21:00 and 22:30 respectively). Both of these orders elaborated on the Allied forces trapped in the north (estimated at 30 to 40 in Gruppenbefehl Nr. 12) and their attempts to escape over the English Channel. Although the removal of 10th Panzer Division by the army leadership in Panzer Group Kleist weakened Guderian's plan, in which the 10th Panzer was to guard the right flank of the advancing corps, the general direction of movement stayed the same for the two remaining panzer divisions.

==== 22 May 1940 ====
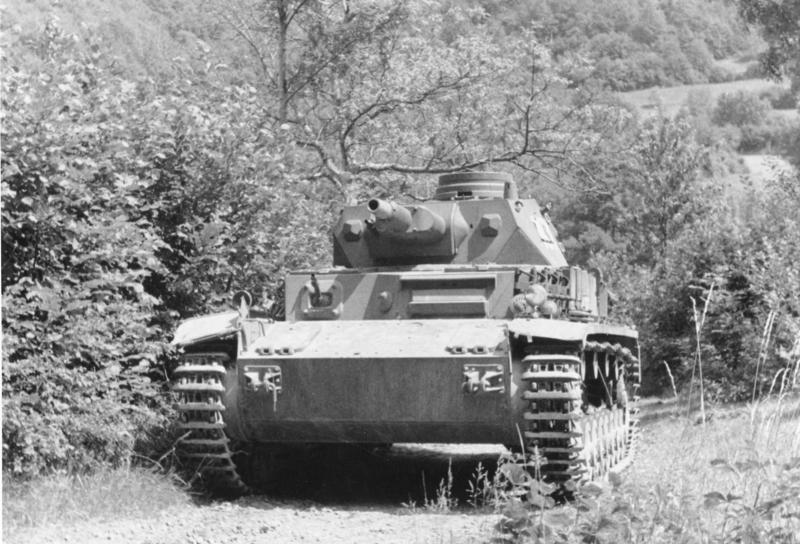
22 May 1940: Panzer IV of 1st Panzer Regiment, 1st Panzer Division

Guderian's request to return 10th Panzer Division to his command were not granted due to the fear of Allied counter-attacks in style of the Battle of Arras, and so XIX Army Corps had to continue the operation with just 1st and 2nd Panzer Divisions on the morning of 22 May. It was thus decided to leave Dunkirk for a later stage of the operation and to focus on Calais with 1st Panzer and on Boulogne with 2nd Panzer. The 2nd would advance along the coast, whereas the 1st would move towards its goal inland, along Saint-Omer. In their preparations, XIX Army Corps could count on support from other units; 8th Panzer Division captured Hesdin (initially 10th Panzer's domain as per Guderian's plan before 10th Panzer was moved into the reserve), whereas 6th Panzer Division reached Boisle. Both 6th and 8th Panzer Divisions were at that point part of XLI Army Corps. XIX Army Corps began its operation towards Calais and Boulogne on 22 May. By 08:00, the Authie river had been crossed and a partial advance northwards had begun. At that point, parts of both 1st and 2nd Panzer Divisions still had to be held back in rearguard action at the Somme river bridgeheads until they could be reinforced by XIV Army Corps (v. Wietersheim).

On the afternoon of the 22nd, heavy fighting broke out at Desvres, Samer and south of Boulogne. While the bulk of the Allied forces consisted of French troops, Guderian also notes resistance by British, Belgian and Dutch forces. Under heavy Allied aerial bombardment, 2nd Panzer Division advanced on Boulogne after authorization for their attack had been given at 12:40 at noon. At 15:30, Halder notes that Panzer Group Kleist began its attack with XLI Corps on the right and XIX Corps on the left, judging the overall situation as "much better than we thought". By the evening, Guderian had instructed 1st Panzer Division to switch its main target from Calais to Dunkirk and to await a coded messages to begin the assault the following day. In the meantime, 10th Panzer Division was returned from the army reserves to XIX Army Corps. In the late evening of the 22nd, Panzer Group Kleist gave out Gruppenbefehl Nr. 13 at 22:30 to determine the military operations for the following day. The main designated targets for the Panzer Group were the cities of Boulogne and Calais. XLI Army Corps was to advance north and establish bridgeheads at Aire and St Omer.

For the detailed rundown of 2nd Panzer Division's combat in Boulogne, see also Battle of Boulogne (1940).

==== 23 May 1940 ====
Topographic map of the Côte d'Opale region. Abbeville is in the south east, Calais in the far north. Boulogne would be captured by the 25th.

The codeword Abmarsch Ost ('departure east', as in 'depart eastwards') was given in the early morning hours of 23 May 1940 and the time of the attack timed for 10:00, as had been established in the radio message to 1st Panzer Division. In the meantime, 2nd Panzer Division was still fighting for control of Boulogne, approaching the cathedral after bypassing the medieval city walls.

==== 24 May 1940 ====
On 24 May, the 1st Panzer Division reached the river Aa and established bridgeheads on its north bank at Holque, St Pierre-Brouck, St Nicolas and Bourbourgville. 2nd Panzer Division was still busy finishing up the conquest of Boulogne, but the Allied resistance had been decisively weakened, meaning that some of its forces could be pulled out to aid combat elsewhere. The main force of 10th Panzer Division advanced to the line Desvres-Samer. Guderian's force was strengthened on May 24, when 1st SS Panzer Division "Leibstandarte Adolf Hitler" was joined into XIX Army Corps. 1st SS Panzer (Note: Henceforth to be referred to as "Leibstandarte" to avoid confusion between 1st Panzer and 1st SS Panzer.) was tasked with supporting 1st Panzer with an attack on Watten, in which it was to be reinforced by 2nd Panzer after its victory at Boulogne. In the meantime, 10th Panzer Division had encircled Calais and began the Siege of Calais. Guderian tasked 10th Panzer's commander Ferdinand Schaal with a delayed approach, as 10th Panzer was to be reinforced by heavy artillery from Boulogne. Parallel to XIX Army Corps' advance, Reinhardt's XLI Corps had taken Saint Omer. The operation was cut down decisively around noon, upon the personal intervention of Adolf Hitler.

On this day [24 May] there was an intervention of supreme leadership into the operations that should influence the entire war in the most detrimental of ways. Hitler stopped the army's entire left wing at the Aa. The creek ["Flüßchen", 'little river'] was not to be crossed. The reason was not given to us. The order contained the words: "Dunkirk is to be left to the air force. If the conquest of Calais meets difficulty, it too is to be left to the air force." Content of the order recalled from memory.

— Heinz Guderian – Erinnerungen eines Soldaten, p. 104

Thus, the various ground forces advancing on Dunkirk stopped in their tracks over the course of 24 May.

For the proceedings in Dunkirk itself, see Battle of Dunkirk.

==== 25 May 1940 ====
On the morning of 25 May, Guderian found Leibstandarte in defiance of the order to not cross the Aa, as Leibstandarte commander Sepp Dietrich had decided to cross it and take the Wattenberg hill on the other side of the river at Watten. This 72 metre elevation had been determined by Dietrich to be a decisive strategic weakness to any German unit on the other side of the river. Guderian agreed with Dietrich's assessment, and, in defiance of the order, allowed Leibstandarte and Großdeutschland to maintain their advanced positions. Parts of 2nd Panzer Divisions advanced towards the river's south bank to back up the northwards manoeuvre. At the same time, 10th Panzer Division's ultimatum to the besieged Allied units at Calais was rejected by Claude Nicholson, the British commander of the Allied forces. Boulogne fell into the hands of 2nd Panzer Division as the last remainder of the Allied forces surrendered, even though 4,286 Allied soldiers were successfully evacuated by the Royal Navy. The directive Korpsbefehl Nr. 13 was given out at 11:00 on May 25 and assigned defensive duties on the German right flank to 10th Panzer Division and the defense of the German left to 2nd Panzer Division, separated at Audresselles. In the meantime, 1st Panzer Division would defend at St Momelin.

==== 26 May 1940 ====
Calais fell into German hands on 26 May 1940. Claude Nicholson and his French counterpart Raymond Le Tellier were taken POW, whereas French commander Charles de Lambertye was killed in action by German forces. Nicholson had received word from Winston Churchill the previous day that no evacuation and no relief was coming, but that the besieged units at Calais were of vital importance to the BEF in their ability to tie down and distract the German units. Nicholson would die in German captivity in 1943. The victory at Calais saw XIX Army Corps to take some 20,000 Allied soldiers POW. Although the decisive action of 10th Panzer Division had proven the ability of German ground units to break into occupied cauldrons, they were still denied the right to proceed the same way against the Allied units at Dunkirk, and so they were forced to idly sit by as Operation Dynamo unfolded.

In the siege ring around Dunkirk, XIV Army Corps caught up to XIX Army Corps and 20th Infantry Division, which had seen service with XIX Army Corps during the Invasion of Poland, became part of Guderian's unit once more, taking its place in the siege ring next to Leibstandarte. It took until noon on the 26th for Hitler to revert his order regarding Dunkirk, and the new instructions took until nightfall to arrive. 20th Infantry Division, Leibstandarte and Großdeutschland were to advance on Wormhout. 1st Panzer Division was instructed to cover their right flank. The defensive catchup of 20th Infantry Division to take 1st Panzer Division's was handled at 12:15 at noon in a directive directed at both divisions, while the operational targets for 27 May were set at 20:00 through Korpsbefehl Nr. 14.

==== 28 May 1940 ====
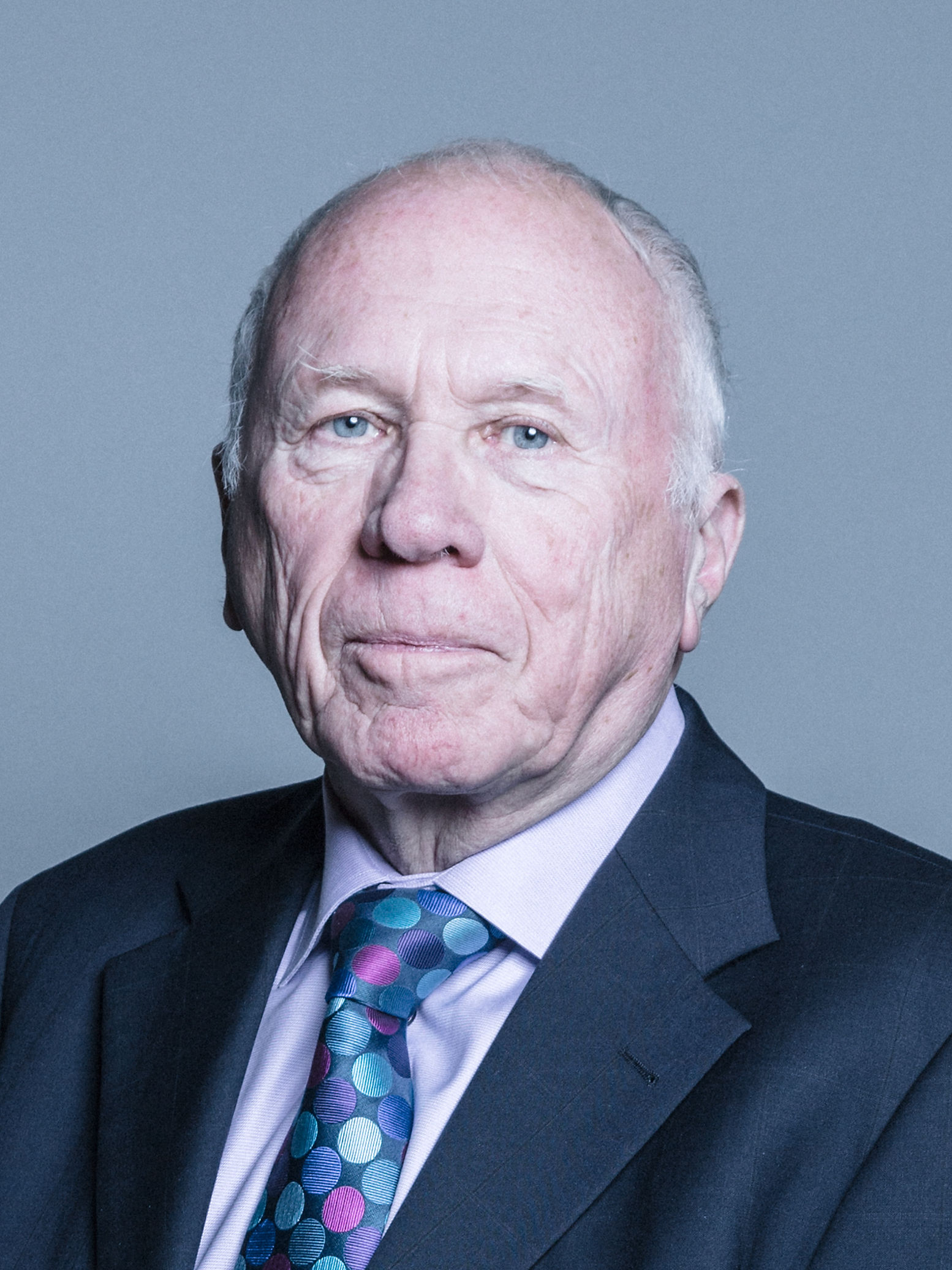
Jeff Rooker (born 1941), former MP of the Labour Party. In the late 1980s, he attempted to investigate the role of units of 1st SS Panzer in the Wormhoudt massacre of 1940.

On May 28, Wormhout and Bourbourgville were taken. After the capture of Wormhout, soldiers of Leibstandarte killed 80 men of British 144th Infantry Brigade in what has become known as the Wormhout massacre. The last Allied veteran to survive that massacre, the then 19-year-old Bert Evans of Royal Warwickshire Regiment, died in 2013 at age 92.

Guderian in his Erinnerungen eines Soldaten fails to acknowledge the incident, just noting that Wourmhout was "the target" of 20th Infantry Division and was "reached" by 28 May. He does not mention misbehaviour by Leibstandarte troops on any other occasion either and generally fails to properly acknowledge and work through German war crimes during any of the three theaters his book covers (Invasion of Poland, Battle of France and the Eastern Front) and has been criticized by British historian Ian Kershaw, among others, for trying to reflect himself in the best possible light.

One of the most notable suspected instigators of the massacre was Wilhelm Mohnke, then commander of the 5th Company of the 2nd Battalion of Leibstandarte. Mohnke's involvement was not brought to trial in the immediate aftermath of the war, and when British parliament MP Jeff Rooker (Labour Party) attempted to lead an investigation into the massacre in 1989, the (West) German prosecution found the evidence against Mohnke insufficient. The investigations by British and German parties with assistance by British survivors and German SS veterans highly suggest that Mohnke was indeed responsible for giving or at least passing the order to execute the prisoners. The operations on 28 May 1940 were amended at 23:15, just before midnight, with a renewed directive from corps leadership, Korpsbefehl Nr. 15.

==== 29 May 1940 ====
On 29 May, 1st Panzer Division captured Gravelines. By then, XIX Army Corps had been replaced in the siege ring around Dunkirk by XIV Army Corps and was thus not present when Dunkirk fell fully into German hands.

With the German victory at Dunkirk, the XIX Army Corps concluded its campaign.

==== Southwards redeployment (30 May – 9 June 1940) ====
On 28 May 1940, Hitler had ordered the creation of a new panzer group under the leadership of Heinz Guderian. On 1 June 1940, Guderian was assigned to the command of Panzergruppe Guderian, taking most of the staff from XIX Army Corps with him. The Panzer Group was assigned command over two army corps: XLI Corps, still under command of Reinhardt, and XXXIX Corps under Rudolf Schmidt. Panzer Group Guderian became part of Wilhelm List's 12th Army.

With the addition of XLI Corps and XXXIX Corps, Panzer Group Guderian was thus strengthened with the force of the 2nd, 6th and 8th Panzer Divisions. 10th Panzer Division was no longer part of the Panzer Group.

The German victory in Calais and the Allied evacuation of Dunkirk signalled German success in the north, and so most of the German forces in the north, including Panzergruppe Guderian were now deployed southwards to deliver the final blow to France. While the marching distances were long (250 km direct distance, with about 100 km additional distance inflicted by destroyed infrastructure), the units were given a few days of delay to reach their designated location, making for the first period of rest since the beginning of the campaign, aside from the somewhat idle day on 21 May.

While Fedor von Bock's Army Group B could commence its operations on 5 June 1940, Rundstedt's Army Group A (and thus Panzergruppe Guderian) were delayed until 9 June.

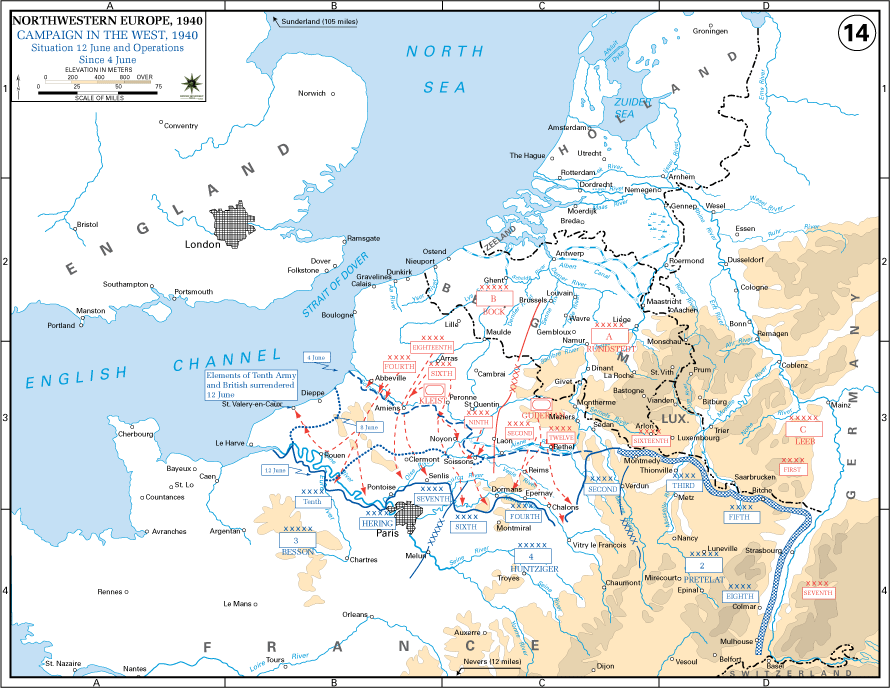
Western Campaign: 4–12 June 1940

==== 10 June 1940 ====
The renewed advance of the panzer group could begin on 10 June at 06:30, after 1st and 2nd Panzer Divisions had gained bridgeheads on both sides of Château-Porcien. By now, French tactics against armored units had changed - open fields were only rarely defended against the panzers, whereas settlements and forests became nests of resistance against German infantry advances.

Halder noted in his entry of 10 June 1940 that Group Guderian managed to reach Joinville ahead of schedule, leading the spearhead east of the river Oise. 1st Panzer Division advanced along both banks of the Retourne river, reaching Juniville in the afternoon. There, the division was counterattacked by French armored contingents that were repelled after some two hours of combat. 1st Panzer Division suffered numerous casualties at the hands of French Char B1 model heavy tanks that 3.7 cm and 2 cm cannons were almost completely ineffective against. Another such tank battle took place north of Juniville in the afternoon.

==== 11 June 1940 ====
On 11 June, Guderian and Balck met near La Neuville, where 1st Panzer Division was continuing the attack against French armored formations that Guderian in Erinnerungen eines Soldaten identifies as likely having been part of the French '7th Light Division'. Although it is not entirely clear what unit he meant, he likely referred to 7th Light Mechanized Division, a formation formed on 5 June 1940 (see also List of French divisions in World War II). 2nd Panzer Division reached Époye on 11 June, supported by 29th Infantry Divisions in the forests to the southwest of Époye. On the left flank of Group Guderian, XLI Army Corps was subjected to a powerful French counterattack led by the French 3rd Mechanized and 3rd Armored Divisions. At dusk, Guderian mit with Walther von Brauchitsch, commander-in-chief of the Heer, and as he was not given any further instructions, proceeded to continue the attack the following day.

==== 12 June 1940 ====
XXXIX Army Corps combined forces with 2nd Panzer Division to attack Châlons-sur-Marne on 12 June and delegated the task of capturing Vitry-le-François to 29th Infantry Division and 1st Panzer Division. On the right flank, XLI Army Corps advanced via Somme-Py towards Suippes. At Châlons, the vanguard prepared to cross the Marne river, but failed to check if the bridge they used had been rigged with explosives. The unit suffered numerous fatalities when the bridge was detonated by the Allies. 1st Panzer Division reached Bussy-le-Château by nightfall and was instructed to next target Étrepy and thus the Marne–Rhine Canal.

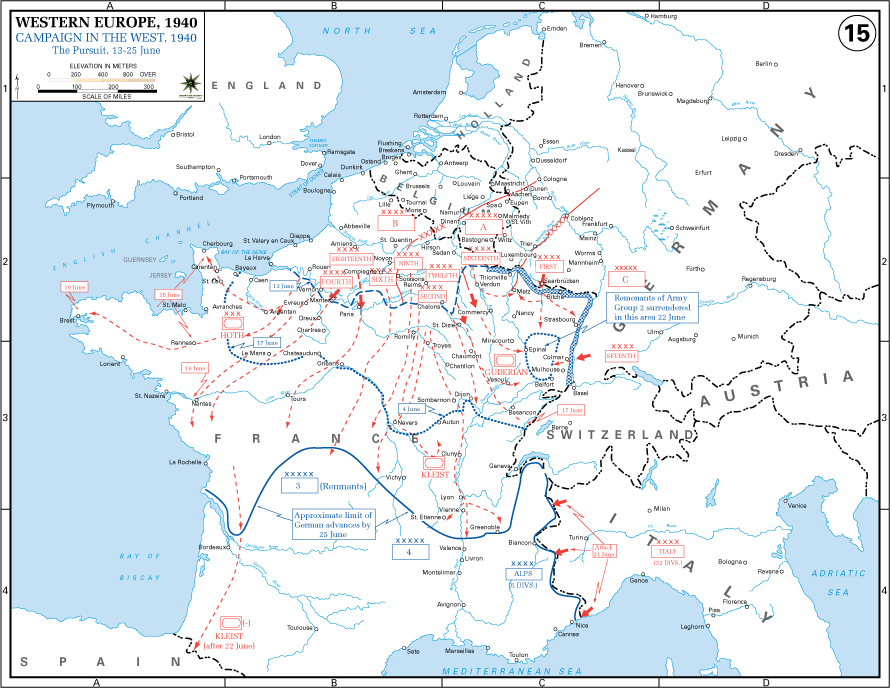
Western Campaign: 13–25 June 1940

==== 13 June 1940 ====
On 13 June, 1st Panzer Division reached the canal at Étrepy. While XXXIX Army Corps had instructed 1st Panzer to not cross the canal, Guderian reversed that directive and Hermann Balck's units of Rifle-Regiment 1 began establishing a bridgehead on the other hand of the canal. The Germans secured a bridge across the canal and managed to save it from destruction by Allied explosives. Guderian in his memoirs points to one Leutnant Weber of the 1st Panzer Division's engineers and one Hauptmann Eckinger, a battalion commander of the 1st Panzer's riflemen, as the primary architects of that small but important victory. Guderian awarded both of them with the Iron Cross 1st Class. (Note: While Guderian does not describe either man in further detail in his memoirs, closer research suggests that Hauptmann Eckinger was one Dr Josef-Franz Eckinger, who became head of 8th Company of Rifle Regiment 1 in 1938 and then, after service in Poland, came to command 2nd Battalion in May of 1940. He would be promoted to Major on 1 January 1941 and became commander of Rifle Regiment 113. He was killed in action 17 October 1941. Nothing is known about Leutnant Weber.)

==== 14 June 1940 ====
On 14 June, the day that German troops marched into Paris at 09:00, 1st Panzer Division reached St Dizier and was then instructed to proceed towards Langres. 29th Infantry Division was to advance on Juzennecourt via Wassy, whereas 2nd Panzer Division was to strike at Bar-sur-Aube via Montier-en-Der.

==== 15 June 1940 ====
On the morning of June 15, 1 Panzer Division forced the surrender of Langres fortress and took some 3,000 French prisoners. 1st Panzer Division was to continue to advance towards Besançon, 2nd Panzer Division towards Til-Châtel. XLI Army Corps would continue its advance southwards on the Marne's east bank. The entire Panzer Group would thus cover the left flank of XVI Army Corps of Erich Hoepner in its advance towards Dijon. 29th Infantry Division captured Pontailler-sur-Saône by nightfall.

==== 16 June 1940 ====
On the following day, a strategically valuable bridge was captured in an undamaged state by 1st Panzer Division at Beaujeu-Saint-Vallier-Pierrejux-et-Quitteur, north of Gray, enabling the Germans to cross the Saône river. During the river crossing, German pilots identified by Guderian as belonging to Wilhelm Ritter von Leeb's Army Group C. Although the ground forces were delayed by the fact that they had to seek cover from the friendly fire, they suffered no casualties. In the afternoon, XXXIX Army Corps reached Besançon, whereas XLI Army Corps took thousands of Allied prisoners (Note: Guderian specifically points out that there were Polish POWs among those captured for the first time in the western campaign.) and captured 30 tanks at Port-sur-Saône, Vesoul and Bourbonne-les-Bains. 16 June 1940 was also the date that Philippe Pétain became leader of France and began negotiating for a ceasefire with the Germans.

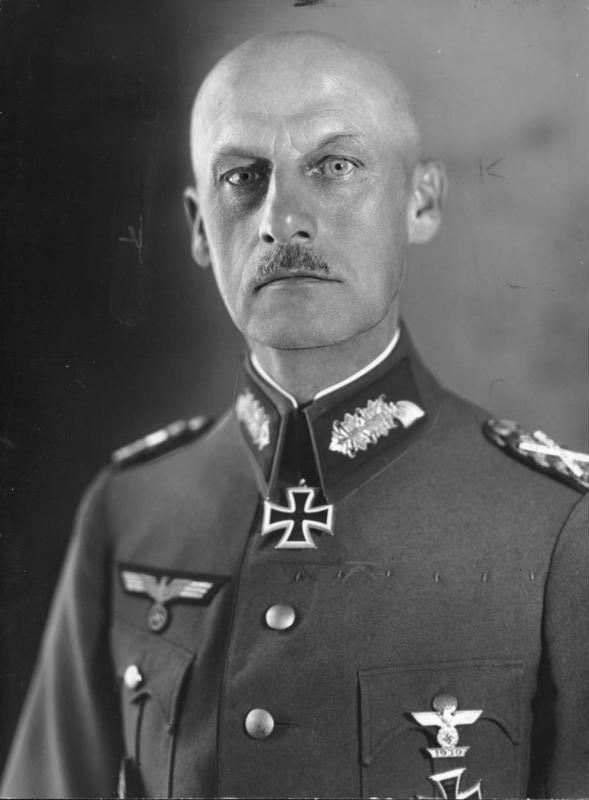
Wilhelm Ritter von Leeb, commander of Army Group C

==== 17 June 1940 ====
On 17 June, 29th Infantry Division was among the first German units to reach the border to Switzerland, meaning that any remaining Allied soldiers on the Maginot Line were now threatened to get completely cut off. The Panzer Group now turned its attention towards the trapped French troops, and XXXIX Army Corps was turned north-east towards Belfort and the upper Moselle river. The goal of these operations was to connect with 7th Army under Friedrich Dollmann. As Panzer Group Guderian now operated in very tight conjunction with Von Leeb's Army Group C, it was transferred from its previous army group to Von Leeb's command. Von Leeb instructed Panzer Group Guderian to advance towards Belfort and Épinal, which was the same general idea that Guderian himself had ordered.

==== 18 June 1940 ====
Around midnight of 18 June, 1st Panzer Division captured Montbéliard and, due to a fuel surplus, was instructed by Guderian to immediately advance further. Guderian visited the captured parts of Belfort at 08:00, also inspecting large amounts of French artillery pieces and vehicles that had been captured by the Panzer Group. However, at that point, all fortified positions within Belfort were still held by French defenders that refused to surrender and thus had to be defeated in urban combat, a process that began at noon. Basses-Perches fell first, then Hautes-Perches and then the citadel. The German soldiers went about the task in an efficient manner between artillery and riflemen and suffered only a few casualties. In the meantime, parts of 1st Panzer Division reached Giromagny, where they took 10,000 prisoners and captured 40 mortars and seven aircraft. 6th Panzer Division captured Épinal, another fortress city, just like 1st Panzer Division had taken Belfort. The Germans captured another 40,000 prisoners. In the meantime, 7th Army's vanguard reached Cernay.

==== 19 June 1940 ====
7th Army and Panzer Group Guderian managed to at last connect their frontlines on 19 June 1940, when the two units met at La Chapelle, to the northeast of Belfort. A number of French forts were conquered, including the Rupt-sur-Moselle, which was captured by 2nd Panzer Division. Guderian planned to have the troops advance into the Vosges region on a wide front, but was met with infrastructural issues when large amounts of German infantrymen of I Army Corps also entered the operational area. To prevent overcrowded roads, he sent an envoy to Von Leeb to better coordinate the advance together with I Army Corps.

==== 20 June 1940 ====
Starting on 20 June, the French ability to put up meaningful resistance completely collapsed. Cornimont fell on the 20th, Bussang on the 21st. Over just a few days, Panzer Group Guderian captured a reported 150,000 (Note: This number was disputed at the time between the various German generals, each of whom tried to claim various prisoner groups as their own. The 150,000 figure was arbitrarily determined by Von Leeb to end the squabbling (see Erinnerungen eines Soldaten, p. 121).) prisoners. Over the course of the operation, the Panzer Group (and XIX Army Corps before it) had captured 250,000 enemy combatants.

==== 22 June 1940 ====
On 22 June 1940, France and Germany agreed to an armistice, giving rise to Vichy France and signalling an end to the campaign of XIX Army Corps and its successor, Panzer Group Guderian.

== Panzergruppe 2 and XIX Mountain Army Corps ==
Panzer Group Guderian became Panzergruppe 2 on 16 November 1940 and, after the onset of the German-Soviet War, became 2nd Panzer Army (2. Panzerarmee) on 6 October 1941. After that, the number XIX (19) was once more free in the numbering of German army corps and was once more granted on 6 November 1942 to Mountain Corps Norway, which then became the XIX. Gebirgs-Armeekorps (XIX Mountain Army Corps).

== Gallery ==
XIX Army Corps

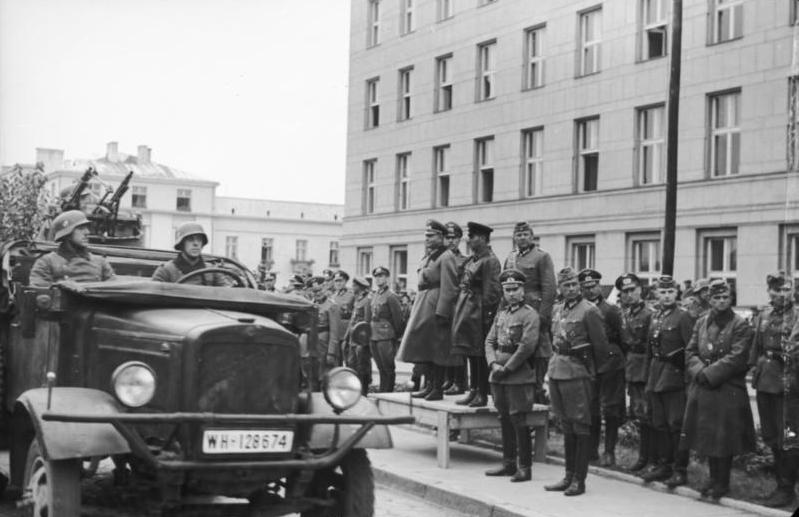
22 September 1939: German Magirus M206 in Brest.

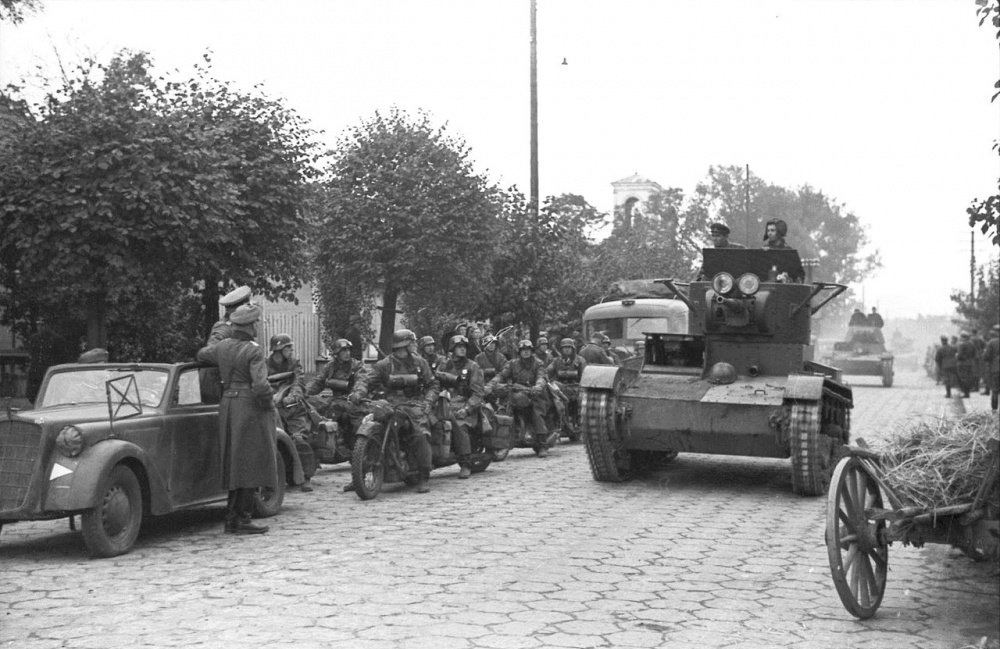
22 September 1939: Soviet T-26 passes German Opel Olympia.

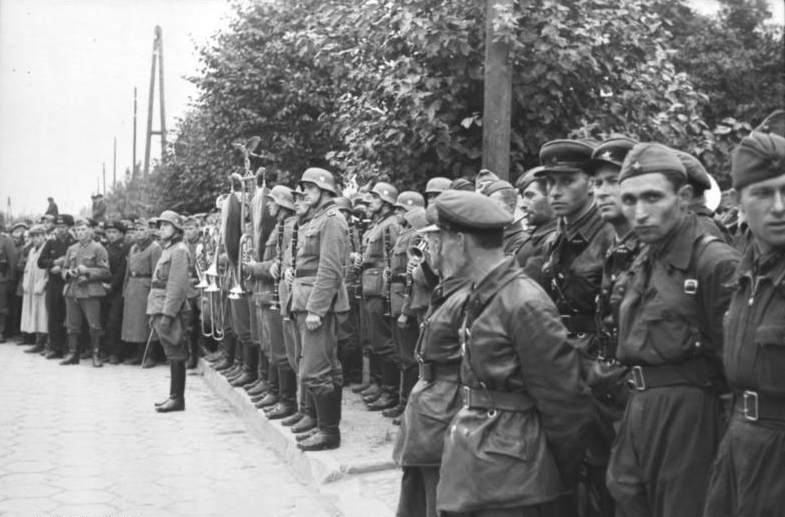
22 September 1939: Soviet and German observers of the joint parade.

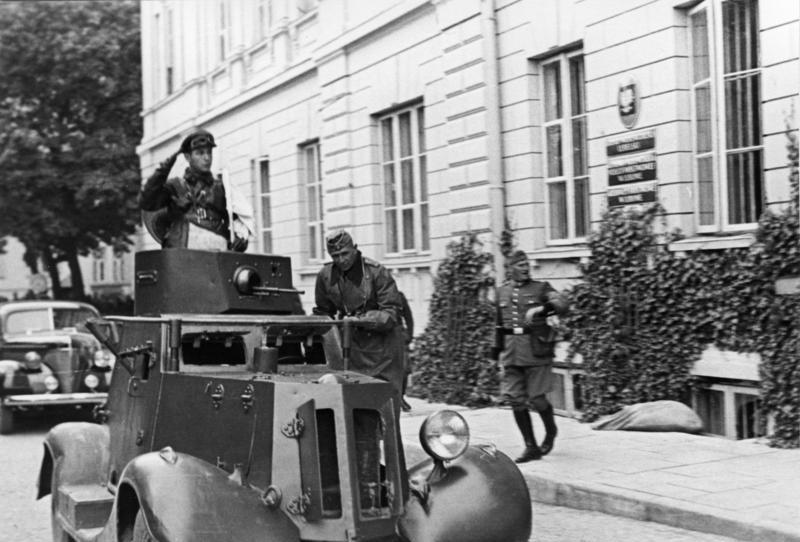
22 September 1939: Soviet PK 637 enters Brest-Litovsk.

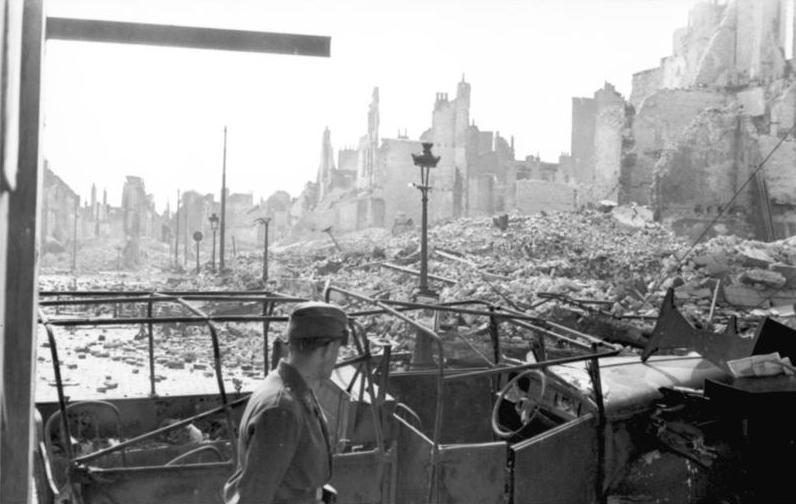
May 1940: Soldier of 10th Panzer Division in the ruins of Calais.

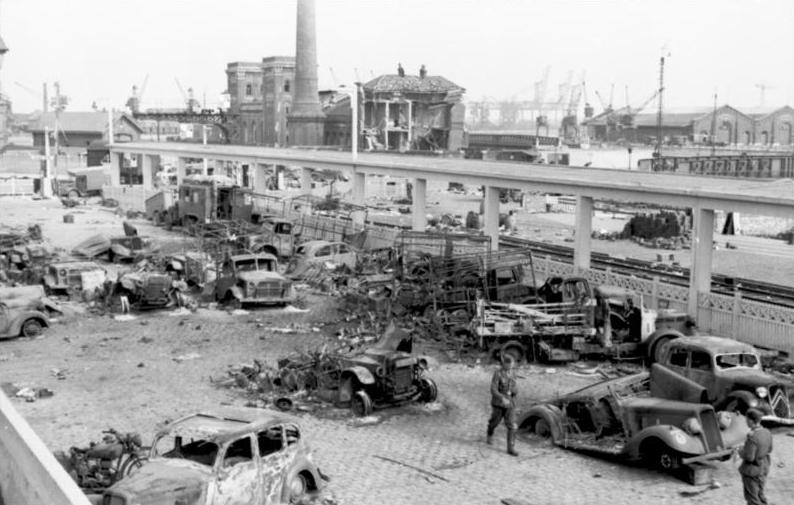
May 1940: Destroyed vehicles at Calais railway station.

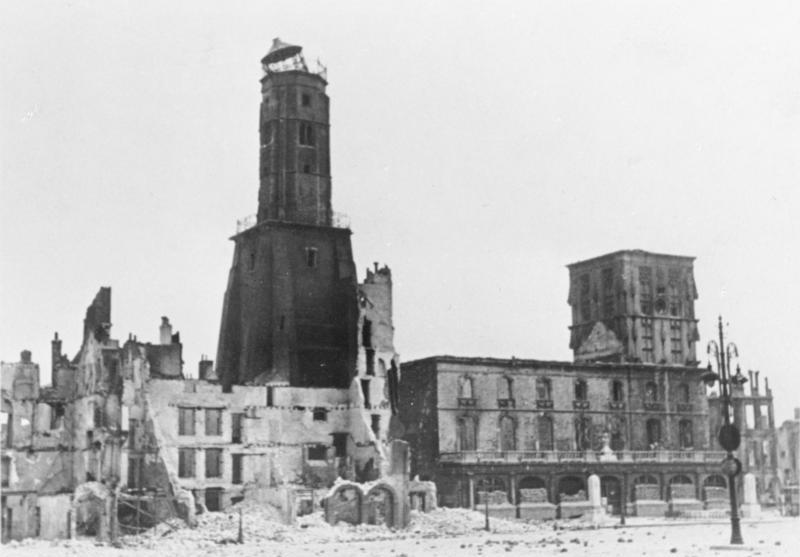
May 1940: Church and houses in Calais, demolished by Stukas.

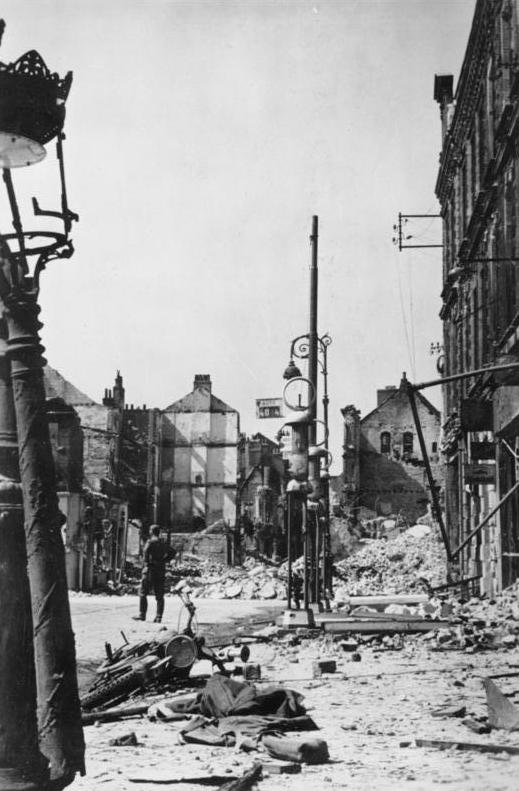
May 1940: Artillery damage in Calais.

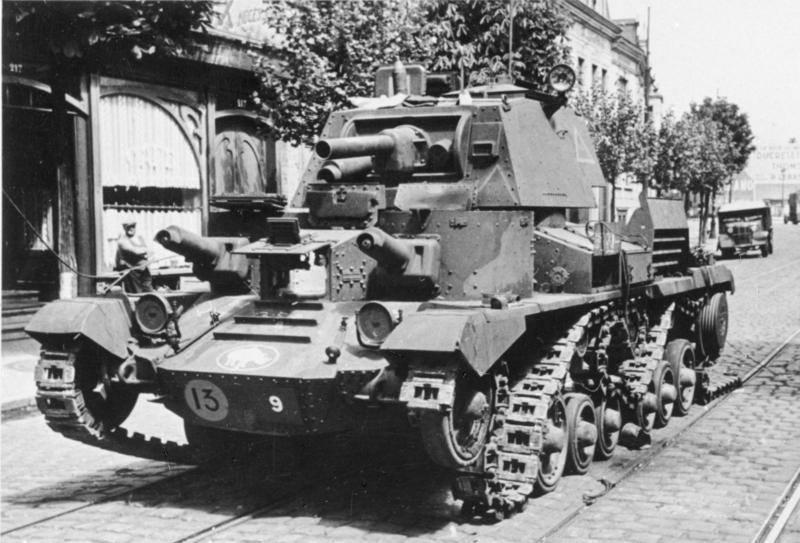
May 1940: Damaged British Cruiser Mk I CS in Calais.

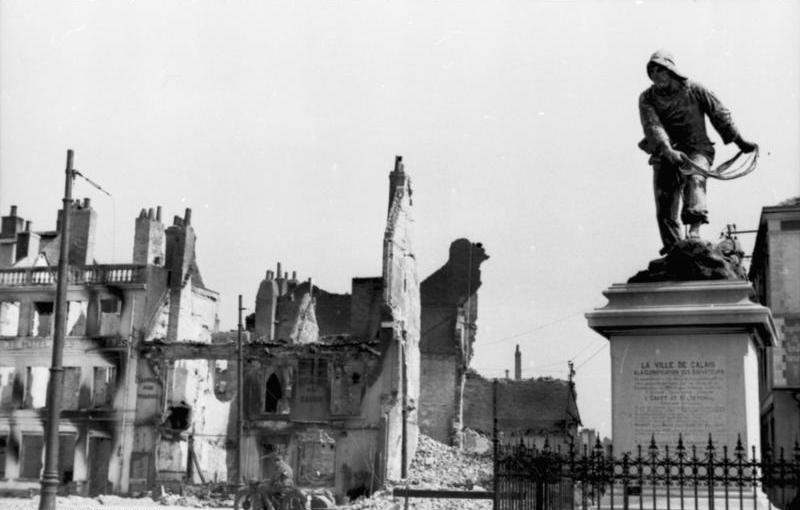
May 1940: Ruins of Calais.

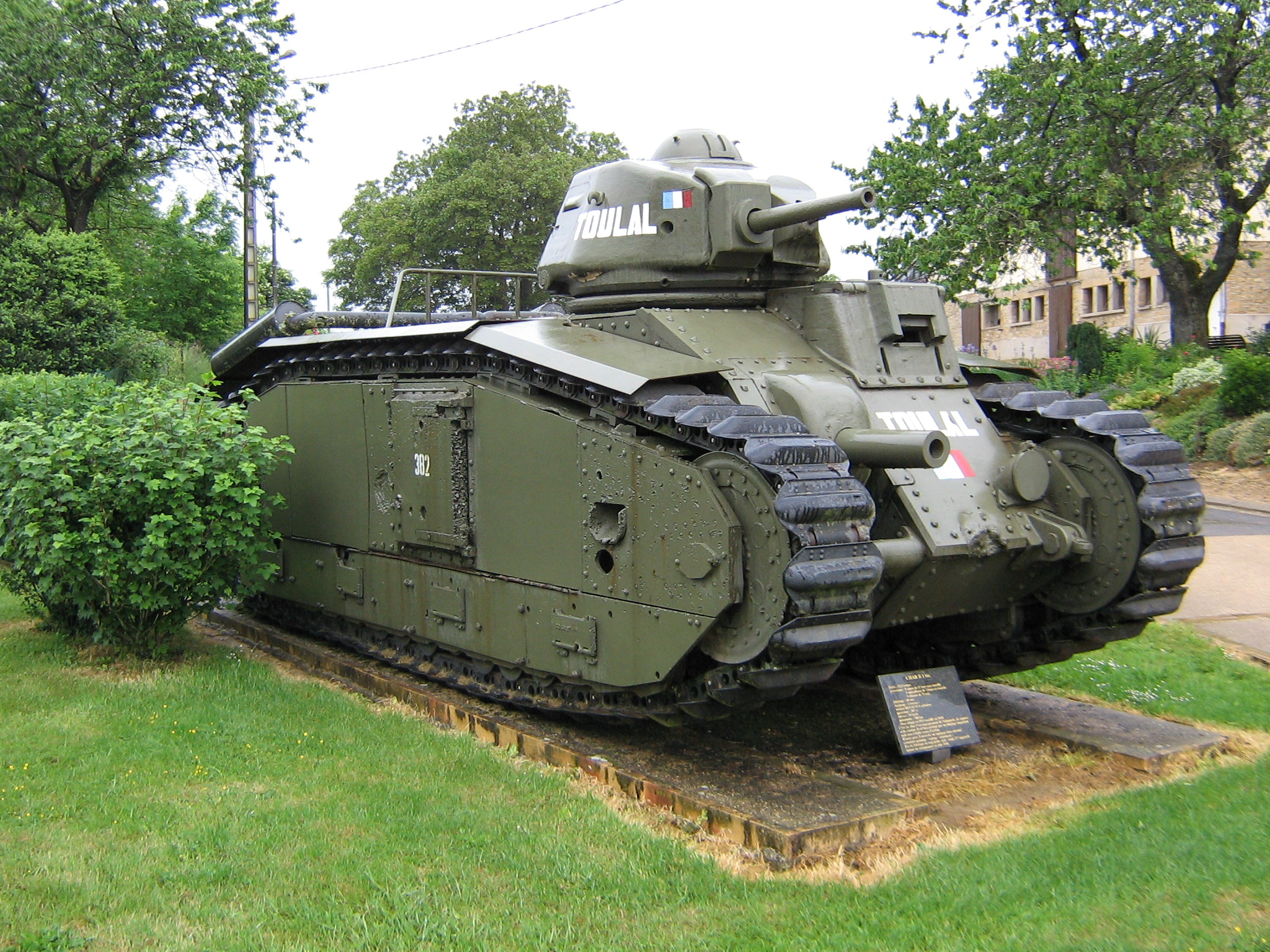
B1 bis monument at the site of the Battle of Stonne.
