= Jean-Paul Houssiaux =

French pediatrician

Jean-Paul Houssiaux (28 March 1928 - 17 October 2014) was a French pediatrician who practiced in French Polynesia in the 1970s - the first pediatrician to do so.

Born in Donchery in France, Houssiaux moved to Tahiti in 1965. He worked at Vaiami hospital in Papeete and then at the pediatrics department at Mamao hospital. He worked there until 1974, when he retired to run his private practice. He returned to France in 1980, and died in Caen on 17 October 2014.
