= Wadelincourt =

Wadelincourt is the name of a number of places.

- Wadelincourt, Ardennes in France.
- Wadelincourt, Wallonia, in Belgium.
