= Thelonne =

- Commune
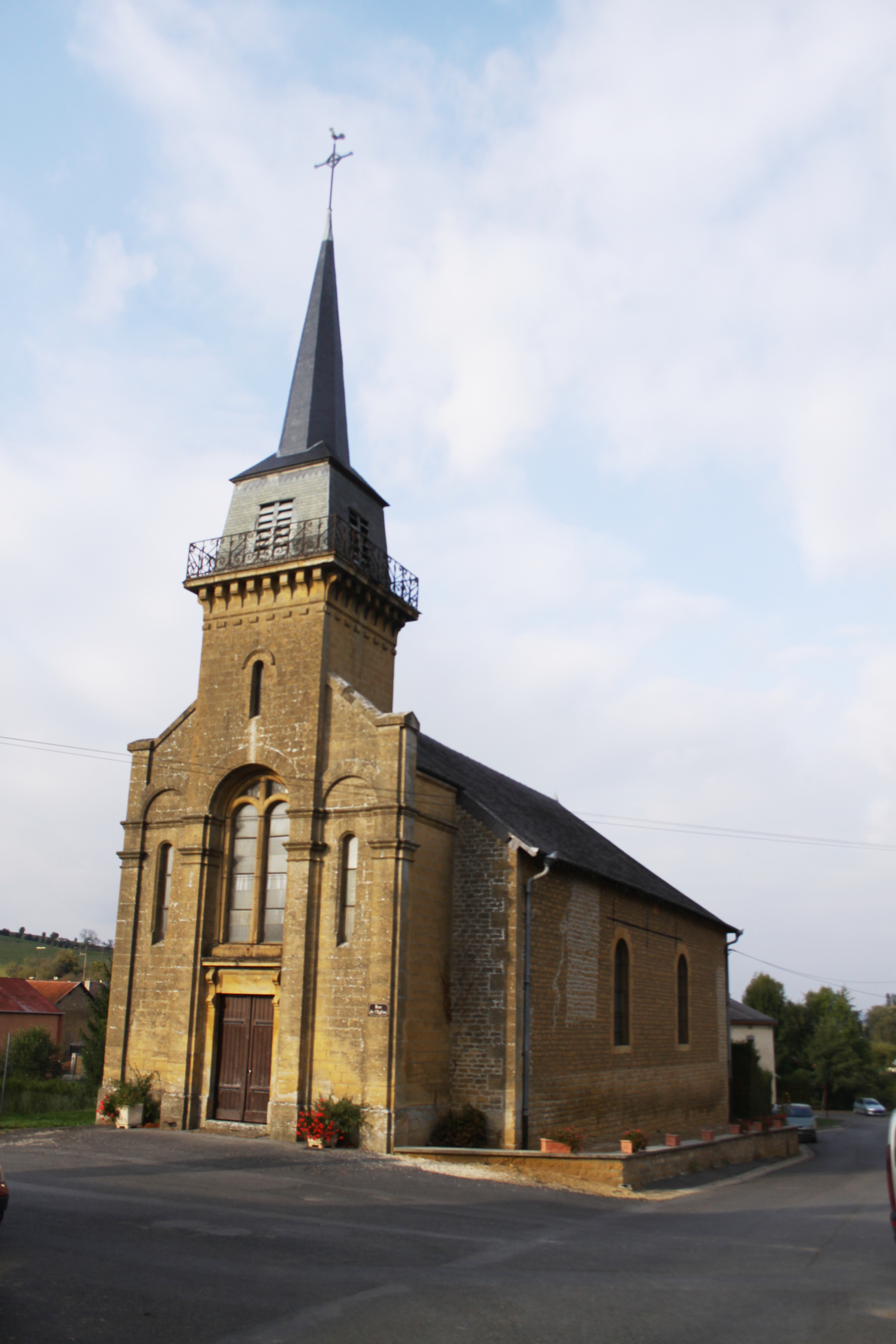
- The church in Thelonne

- Coat of arms
- Location of Thelonne
- Location within France Location within Grand Est
- Coordinates: 49°39′08″N 4°56′40″E
- Country: France
- Region: Grand Est
- Department: Ardennes
- Arrondissement: Sedan
- Canton: Sedan-1
- Intercommunality: CA Ardenne Métropole

Government
  - Mayor (2020–2026): Denis Aupretre
- Area^{1}: 3.84 km^{2} (1.48 sq mi)
- Elevation: 173 m (568 ft)
- Highest elevation: 307 m (1,007 ft)
- Lowest elevation: 162 m (531 ft)
- Population (2023): 405
  - Density: 105/km^{2} (273/sq mi)
- Time zone: UTC+01:00 (CET)
  - Summer (DST): UTC+02:00 (CEST)
- INSEE/Postal code: 08445 /08350
- ^{1} French Land Register data, which excludes lakes, ponds, glaciers > 1 km^{2} (0.386 sq mi or 247 acres) and river estuaries.

Thelonne is a commune in the Ardennes department in northern France.

== Population ==
Historical population
Year	Pop.	±% p.a.
1968	285	—
1975	259	−1.36%
1982	273	+0.75%
1990	280	+0.32%
1999	260	−0.82%
2007	346	+3.64%
2012	373	+1.51%
2017	406	+1.71%
2023	405	−0.04%
Source: INSEE

== See also ==
- Communes of the Ardennes department
