= Canton of Sedan-1 =

Coordinates: 49.70°N 4.93°E

- Canton
- Situation of the canton of Sedan-1 in the department of Ardennes
- Country: France
- Region: Grand Est
- Department: Ardennes
- No. of communes: {{{nbcomm}}}
- Population (2023): 13,052
- INSEE code: 0814

The canton of Sedan-1 is an administrative division of the Ardennes department, northern France. It was created at the French canton reorganisation which came into effect in March 2015. Its seat is in Sedan.

It consists of the following communes:

1. Cheveuges
2. Donchery
3. Noyers-Pont-Maugis
4. Saint-Aignan
5. Sedan (partly)
6. Thelonne
7. Villers-sur-Bar
8. Vrigne-aux-Bois
9. Wadelincourt
