= Villers-sur-Bar =

- Commune
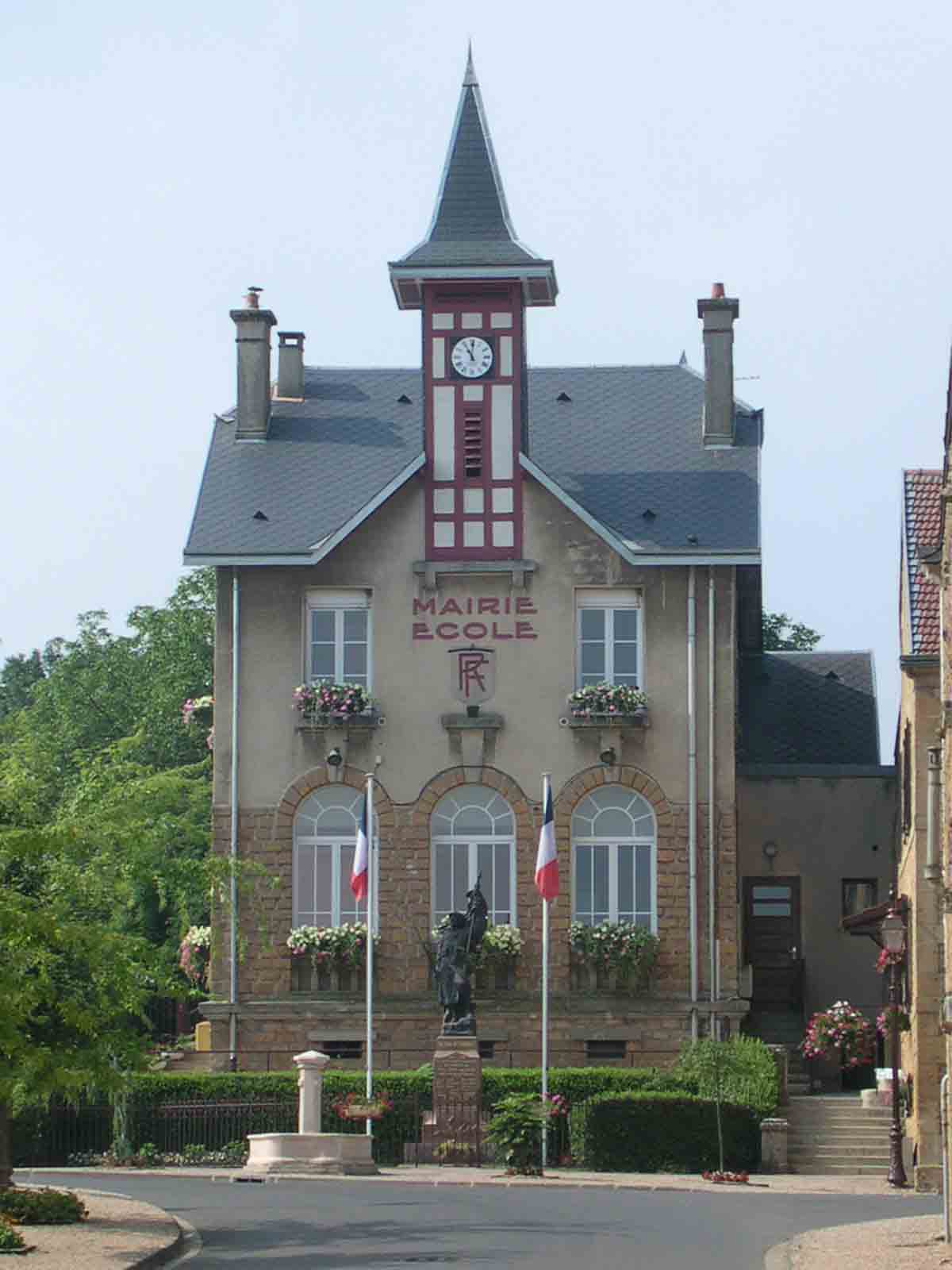
- The town hall in Villers-sur-Bar

- Coat of arms
- Location of Villers-sur-Bar
- Location within France Location within Grand Est
- Coordinates: 49°41′N 4°51′E
- Country: France
- Region: Grand Est
- Department: Ardennes
- Arrondissement: Sedan
- Canton: Sedan-1
- Intercommunality: CA Ardenne Métropole

Government
  - Mayor (2020–2026): Christophe Heller
- Area^{1}: 5.45 km^{2} (2.10 sq mi)
- Elevation: 163 m (535 ft)
- Highest elevation: 166 m (545 ft)
- Lowest elevation: 150 m (490 ft)
- Population (2023): 234
  - Density: 42.9/km^{2} (111/sq mi)
- Time zone: UTC+01:00 (CET)
  - Summer (DST): UTC+02:00 (CEST)
- INSEE/Postal code: 08481 /08350
- ^{1} French Land Register data, which excludes lakes, ponds, glaciers > 1 km^{2} (0.386 sq mi or 247 acres) and river estuaries.

Villers-sur-Bar (French pronunciation: [vilɛʁ syʁ baʁ], literally Villers on Bar) is a commune in the Ardennes department in northern France.

== Population ==
Historical population
Year	Pop.	±% p.a.
1968	168	—
1975	183	+1.23%
1982	198	+1.13%
1990	252	+3.06%
1999	235	−0.77%
2007	252	+0.88%
2012	243	−0.72%
2017	247	+0.33%
2023	234	−0.90%
Source: INSEE

== See also ==
- Communes of the Ardennes department
