= Cheveuges =

- Commune
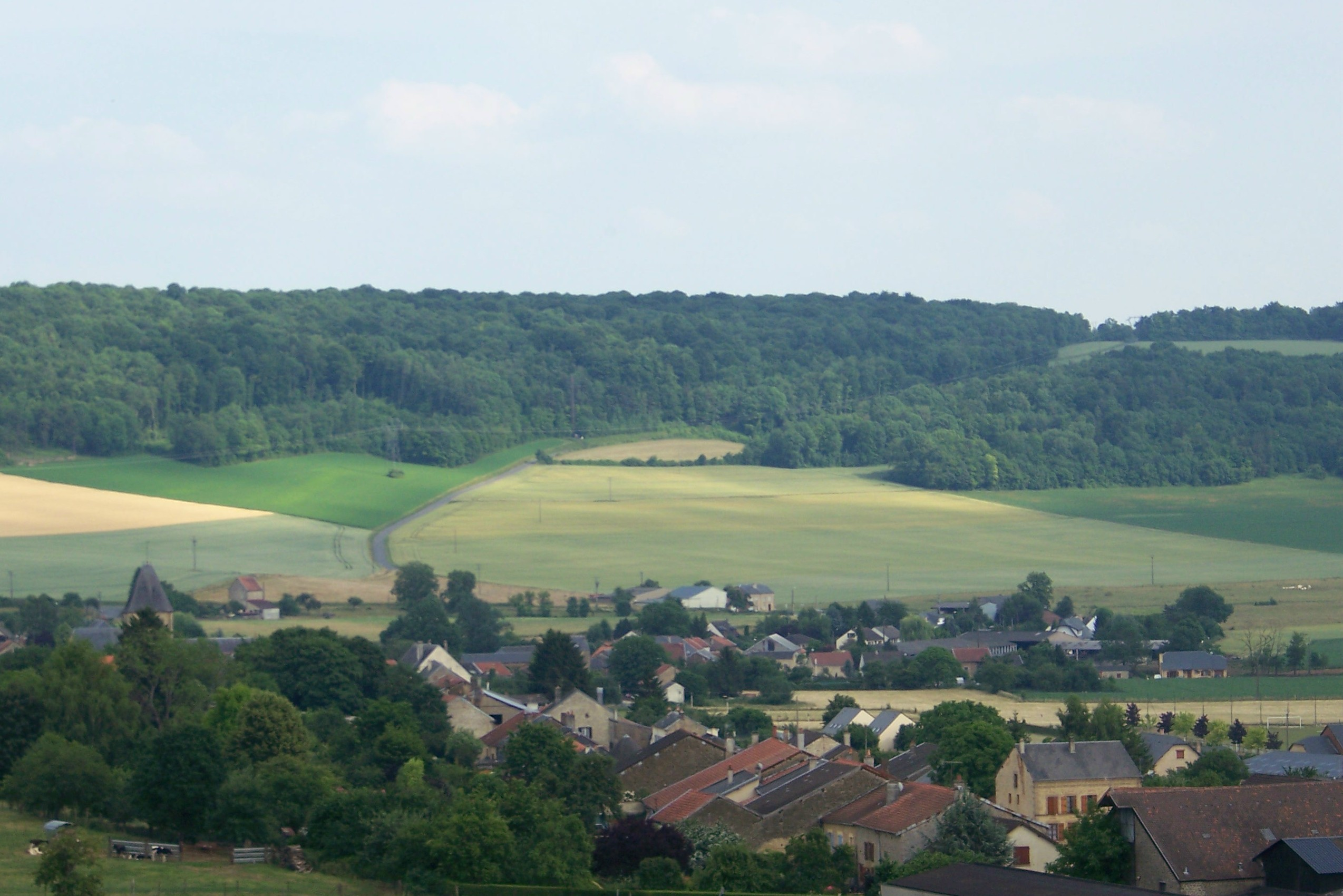
- A general view of Cheveuges

- Coat of arms
- Location of Cheveuges
- Location within France Location within Grand Est
- Coordinates: 49°39′57″N 4°53′01″E
- Country: France
- Region: Grand Est
- Department: Ardennes
- Arrondissement: Sedan
- Canton: Sedan-1
- Intercommunality: CA Ardenne Métropole

Government
  - Mayor (2020–2026): Thierry Alexandre
- Area^{1}: 8.9 km^{2} (3.4 sq mi)
- Elevation: 175 m (574 ft)
- Highest elevation: 336 m (1,102 ft)
- Lowest elevation: 153 m (502 ft)
- Population (2023): 468
  - Density: 53/km^{2} (140/sq mi)
- Time zone: UTC+01:00 (CET)
  - Summer (DST): UTC+02:00 (CEST)
- INSEE/Postal code: 08119 /08350
- ^{1} French Land Register data, which excludes lakes, ponds, glaciers > 1 km^{2} (0.386 sq mi or 247 acres) and river estuaries.

Cheveuges (French pronunciation: [ʃəvøʒ]) is a commune in the Ardennes department and Grand Est region of north-eastern France.

== Population ==
Historical population
Year	Pop.	±% p.a.
1968	273	—
1975	270	−0.16%
1982	341	+3.39%
1990	391	+1.73%
1999	419	+0.77%
2007	416	−0.09%
2012	448	+1.49%
2017	430	−0.82%
2023	468	+1.42%
Source: INSEE

== See also ==
- Communes of the Ardennes department
