= Donchery =

- Commune
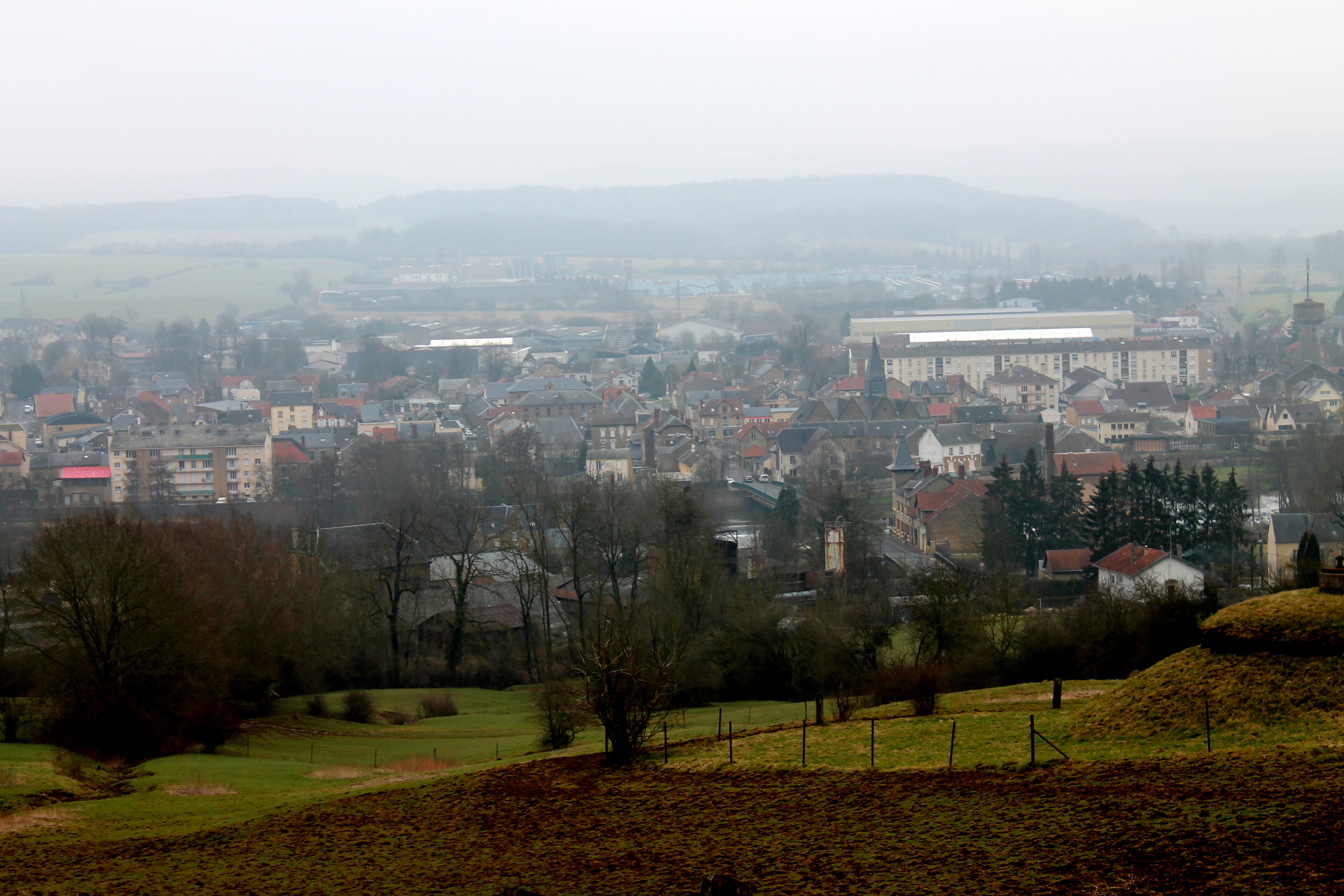
- A general view of Donchery

- Coat of arms
- Location of Donchery
- Location within France Location within Grand Est
- Coordinates: 49°41′50″N 4°52′31″E
- Country: France
- Region: Grand Est
- Department: Ardennes
- Arrondissement: Sedan
- Canton: Sedan-1
- Intercommunality: CA Ardenne Métropole

Government
  - Mayor (2020–2026): Christian Welter
- Area^{1}: 27.36 km^{2} (10.56 sq mi)
- Elevation: 151 m (495 ft)
- Highest elevation: 408 m (1,339 ft)
- Lowest elevation: 147 m (482 ft)
- Population (2023): 1,989
  - Density: 72.70/km^{2} (188.3/sq mi)
- Time zone: UTC+01:00 (CET)
  - Summer (DST): UTC+02:00 (CEST)
- INSEE/Postal code: 08142 /08350
- ^{1} French Land Register data, which excludes lakes, ponds, glaciers > 1 km^{2} (0.386 sq mi or 247 acres) and river estuaries.

Donchery (French pronunciation: [dɔ̃ʃʁi]) is a commune in the Ardennes department in northern France.

== Population ==
Historical population
Year	Pop.	±% p.a.
1968	1,963	—
1975	2,346	+2.58%
1982	2,293	−0.33%
1990	2,362	+0.37%
1999	2,393	+0.14%
2007	2,408	+0.08%
2012	2,286	−1.03%
2017	2,087	−1.81%
2023	1,989	−0.80%
Source: INSEE

== See also ==
- Communes of the Ardennes department
- List of medieval bridges in France
