= Wadelincourt, Ardennes =

Wadelincourt
- Commune
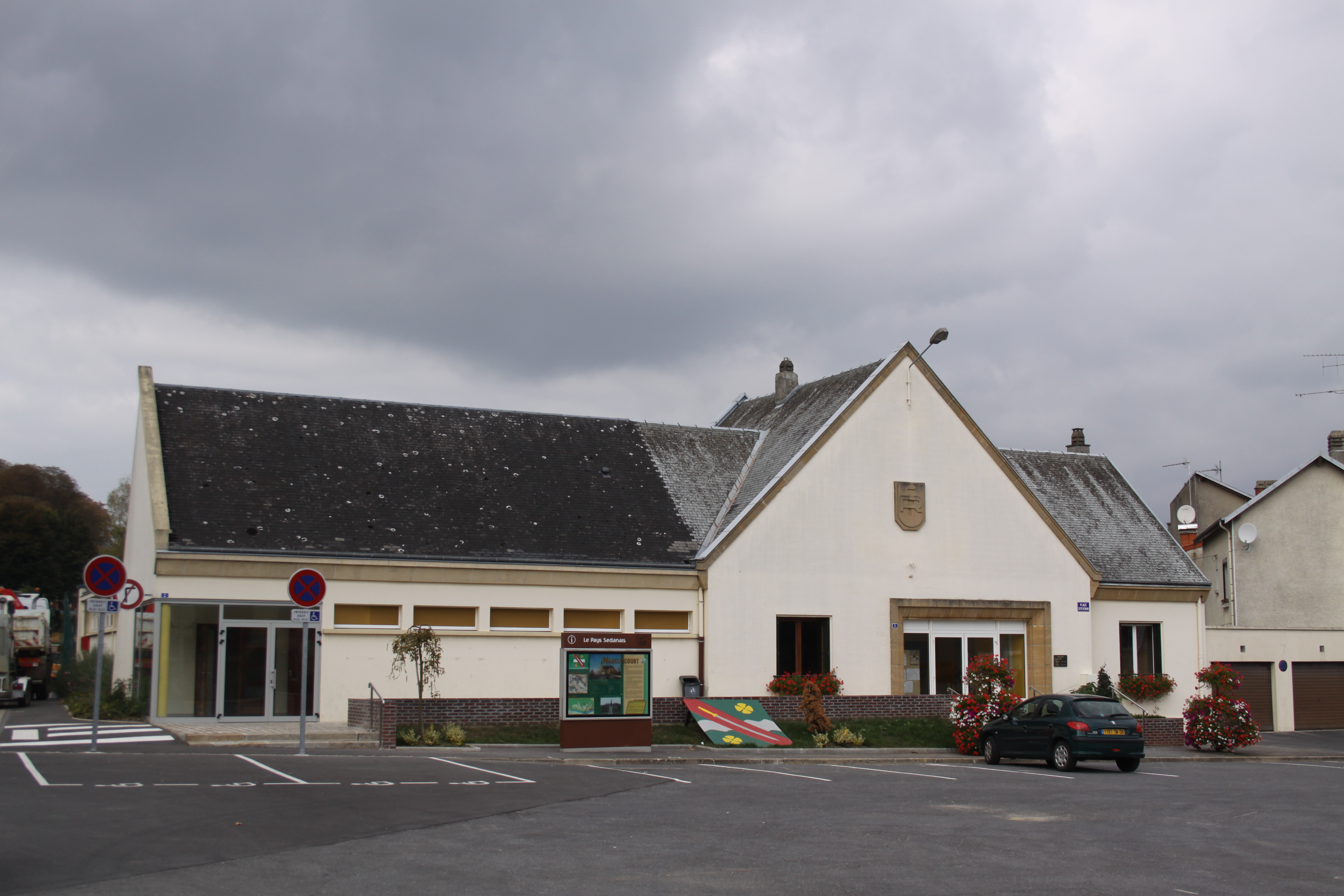
- Town hall

- Coat of arms
- Location of Wadelincourt
- Location within France Location within Grand Est
- Coordinates: 49°41′10″N 4°56′30″E
- Country: France
- Region: Grand Est
- Department: Ardennes
- Arrondissement: Sedan
- Canton: Sedan-1
- Intercommunality: Ardenne Métropole

Government
  - Mayor (2020–2026): Bruno Cuny
- Area^{1}: 4.22 km^{2} (1.63 sq mi)
- Elevation: 155 m (509 ft)
- Highest elevation: 315 m (1,033 ft)
- Lowest elevation: 152 m (499 ft)
- Population (2023): 447
  - Density: 106/km^{2} (274/sq mi)
- Time zone: UTC+01:00 (CET)
  - Summer (DST): UTC+02:00 (CEST)
- INSEE/Postal code: 08494 /08200
- ^{1} French Land Register data, which excludes lakes, ponds, glaciers > 1 km^{2} (0.386 sq mi or 247 acres) and river estuaries.

Wadelincourt (French pronunciation: [vadlɛ̃kuʁ]) is a commune in the Ardennes department in northern France.

== Population ==
Historical population
Year	Pop.	±% p.a.
1968	479	—
1975	519	+1.15%
1982	477	−1.20%
1990	529	+1.30%
1999	526	−0.06%
2007	540	+0.33%
2012	519	−0.79%
2017	473	−1.84%
2023	447	−0.94%
Source: INSEE

== See also ==
- Communes of the Ardennes department
