= Polish cavalry =

Cavalry branch of the Polish Army

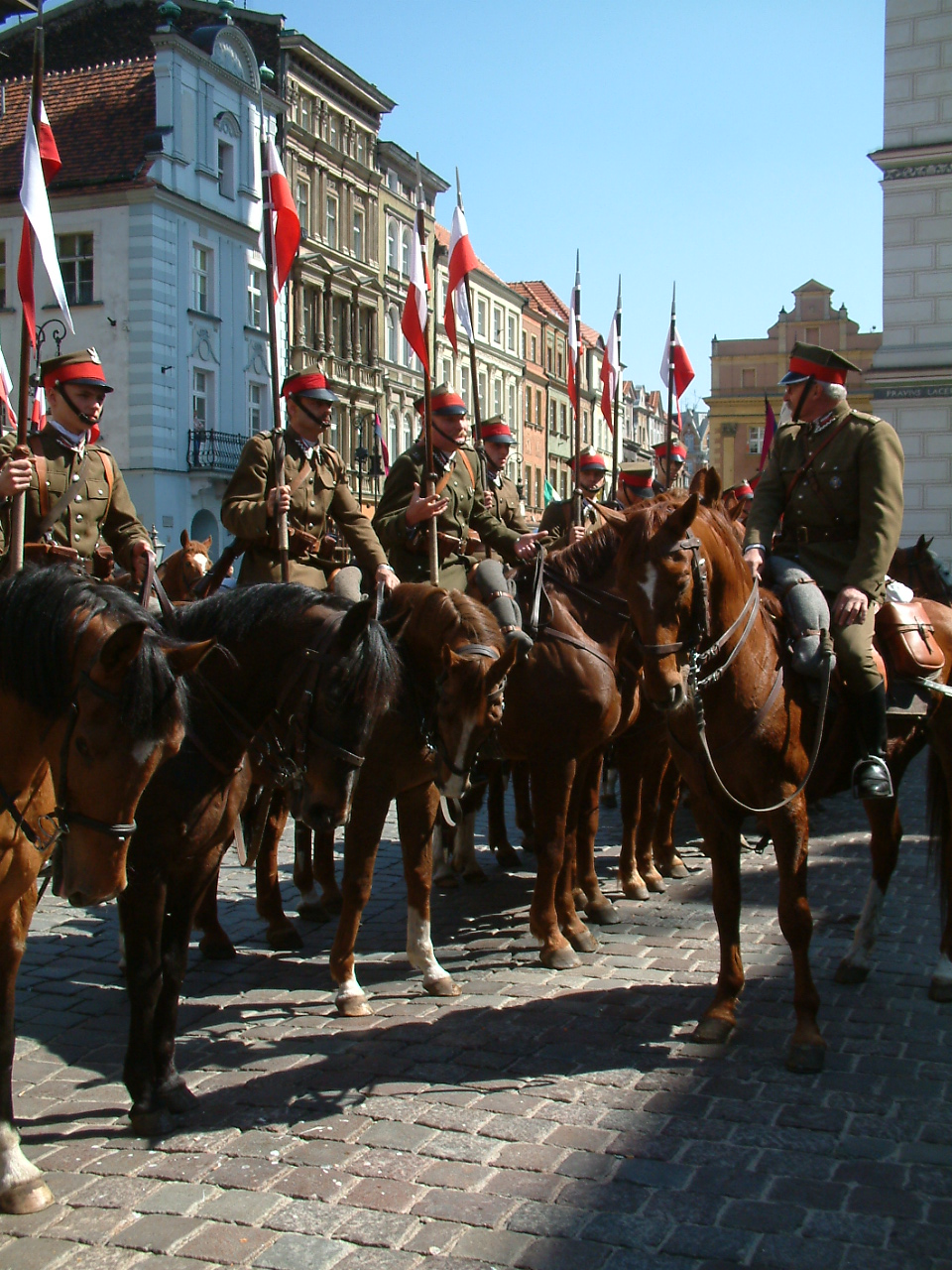
Volunteer Representative Squadron of City of Poznań in uniforms of 15th Poznań Uhlans Regiment

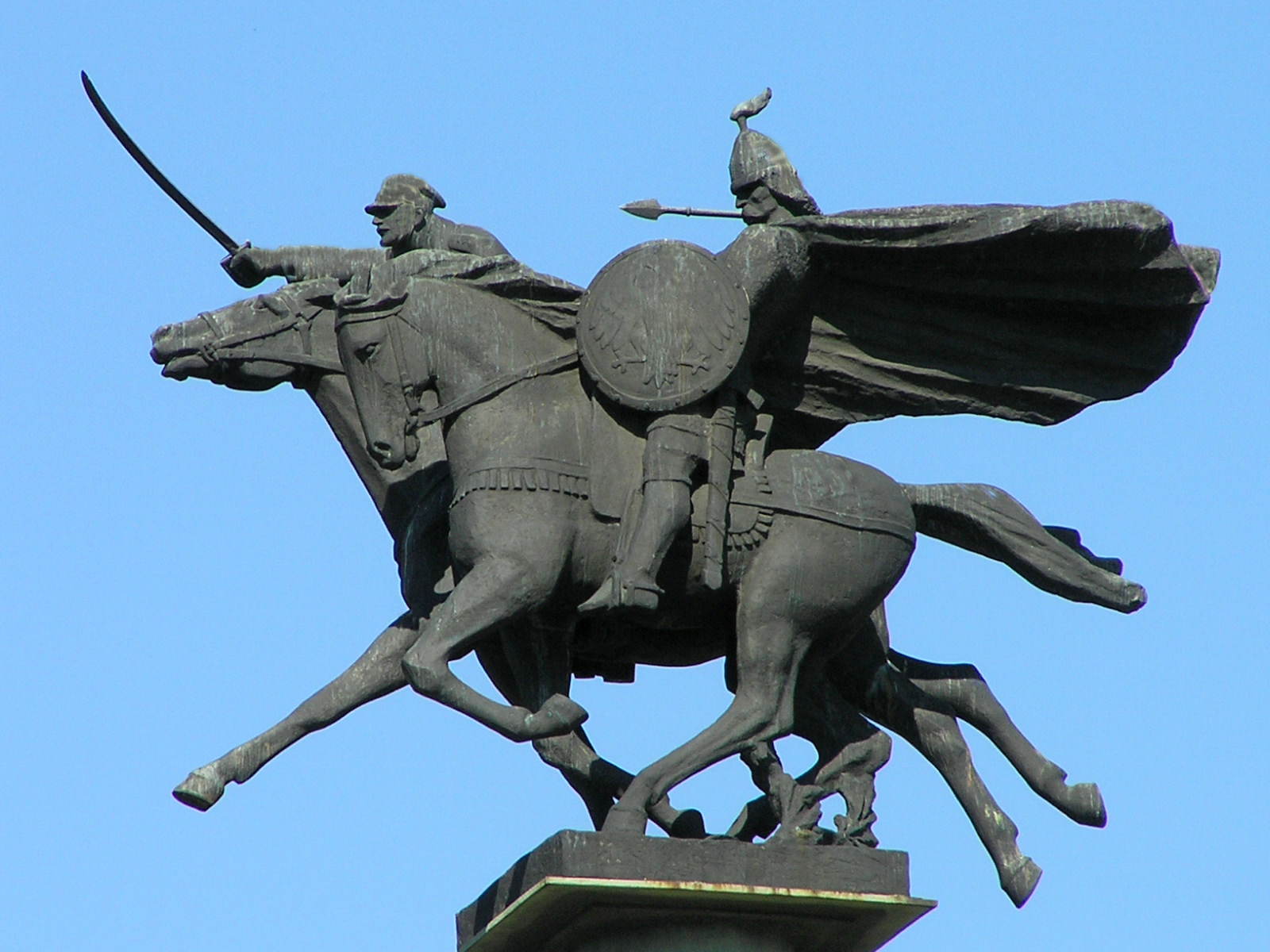
Monument in Warsaw 1000 years of Polish cavalry. "Pancerny" from medieval drużyna of Mieszko I and Polish Uhlan during World War II

The Polish cavalry (Polish: jazda, kawaleria, konnica) can trace its origins back to the days of medieval cavalry knights. Poland is mostly a country of flatlands and fields and mounted forces operate well in this environment. The knights and heavy cavalry gradually evolved into many different types of specialised mounted military formations, some of which heavily influenced western warfare and military science. This article details the evolution of Polish cavalry tactics, traditions and arms from the times of mounted knights and heavy winged hussars, through the times of light uhlans to mounted infantry equipped with ranged and mêlée weapons.

== Early medieval times ==
The first Polish cavalry was created by the Duke of Polans - Mieszko I, who united the West Slav tribes in the area of modern Poland. It is noted in the manuscript of Abraham ben Jacob who traveled in 961–62 in Central Europe. He wrote that the drużyna of Mieszko I had 3000 men, who were paid by the duke. The Prince's druzhina also received a share of military loot.

== Battle of Grunwald ==
Until the 14th century, the Polish armed forces were composed mostly of mounted soldiers. By the start of the 15th century, the core of the Polish armies was formed by mounted knights called to arms by the kings. The basic tactical unit of the army was a banner (chorągiew), that is, a group of approximately 50 men financed by a noble clan, a notable person or a land owner. The banner fought separately and included all the necessary detachments, including its own kitchen, tabors and servants.

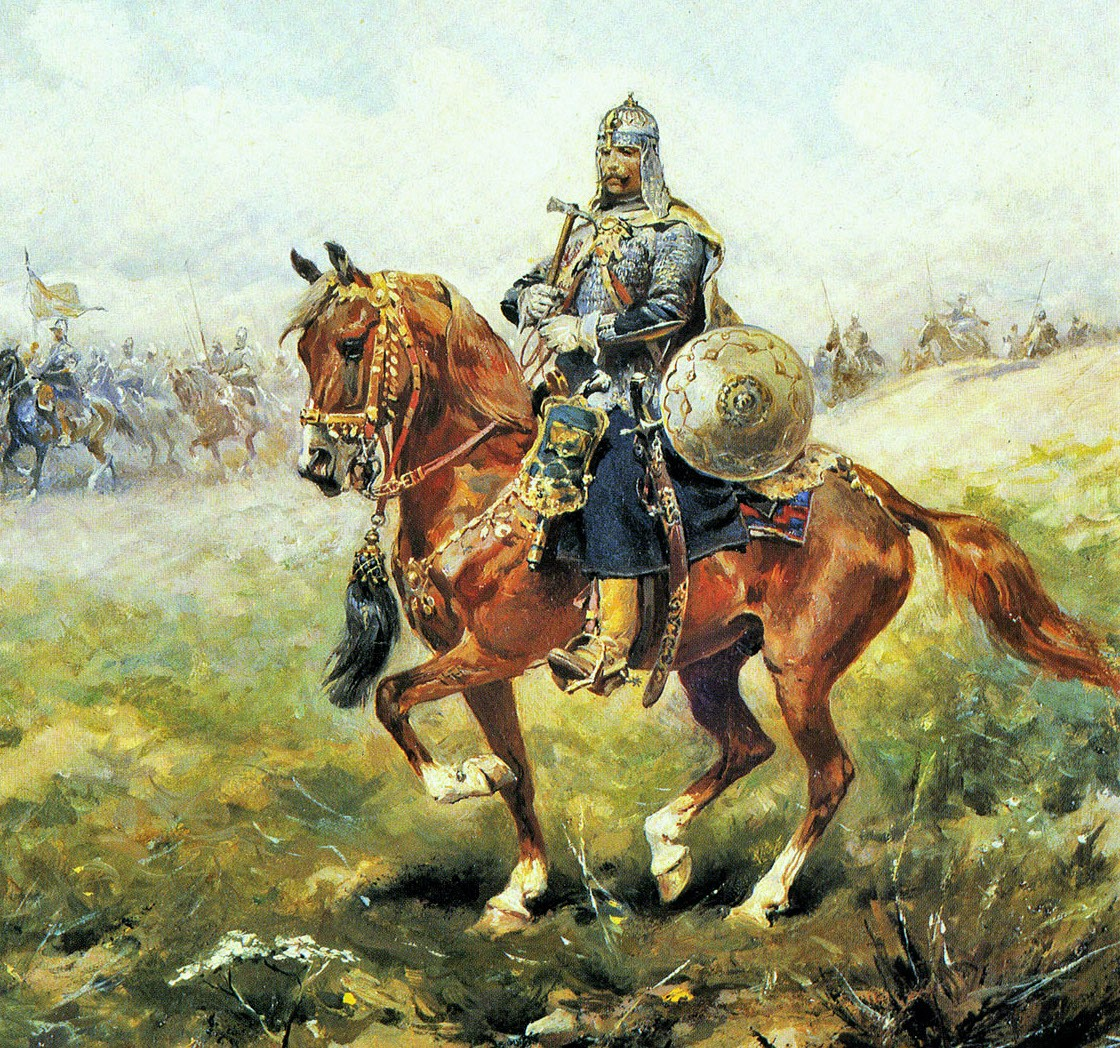
Polish-Lithuanian state, late 17th century Towarzysz pancerny

One of the finest examples of usage of the early Polish cavalry was the Battle of Grunwald of 1410. During the battle, the Polish armoured cavalry was used to break through the Teutonic lines. In addition, the Polish forces were helped by Lithuanian light cavalry of Eastern origins and by Tartar skirmishers, who used mostly hit-and-run tactics. During the battle, after initial clashes of the light cavalry, the Teutonic Order split its forces, which were then defeated by an armoured cavalry charge.

== 16th and 17th centuries ==
In the 16th century the introduction of gunpowder and firearms made the medieval armoured cavalry obsolete. The standing army of the Polish–Lithuanian Commonwealth was gradually converted to other, more modern forms of cavalry. Under eastern influence, the armament of the cavalrymen was lightened and their speed and mobility increased, which added to the successes of the Polish cavalry in numerous wars against the Tsardom of Russia, Ottomans and the Tartars.

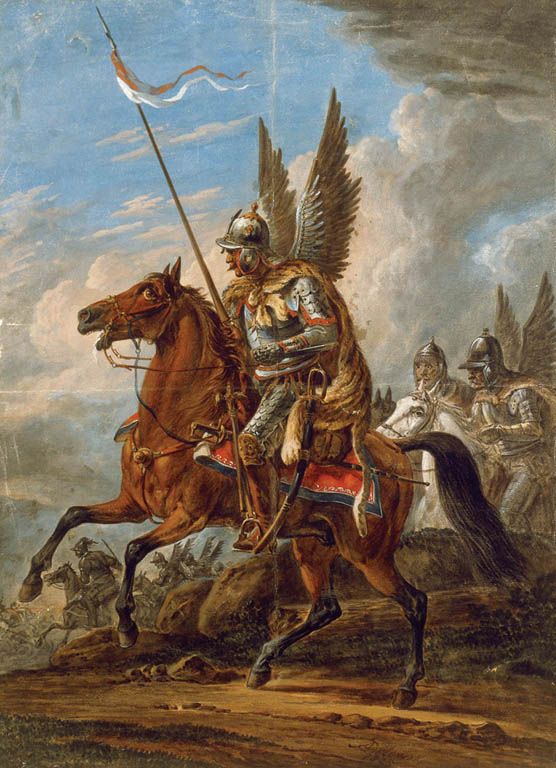
Polish Winged Hussar, wings visible. Painting by Aleksander Orłowski

1503 saw the formation of a first hussar unit in Poland. Being far more manoeuvrable than the heavily armoured lancers previously employed, the hussars proved vital to the Polish victories at Orsza (1514) and Obertyn (1531). By the reign of King Stefan Batory, the hussars had replaced medieval-style lancers in the Polish army, and they now formed the bulk of the Polish cavalry.

Over the course of the 16th century hussars had become heavier in character: they had abandoned wooden shields and adopted plate metal body armour. With the Battle of Lubieszów in 1577 the 'Golden Age' of the husaria began. Until the Battle of Vienna in 1683, the Polish hussars fought countless actions against a variety of enemies, and rarely lost a battle. In the battles of Byczyna (1588), Kokenhausen (1601), Kluszyn (1610), Gniew (1626), Chocim (1673) and Lwów (1675), the Polish hussars proved to be the decisive factor often against overwhelming odds. One of the most notable examples of such victories of the Lithuanian Grand Duchy hussars was the Battle of Kircholm of 1605, in which 3,000 hussars under Jan Karol Chodkiewicz managed to defeat 11,000 soldiers of Charles IX of Sweden - with negligible losses.

As one of the very few units in the Polish national standing army (most of other units were formed as mobilizers), the hussars were well-trained and well-equipped. Until the 18th century they were considered the elite of the Polish national armed forces. Because of the extreme cost, lackluster pay, fame and prestige that surrounded the hussars, almost all of them were members of the upper level nobility (szlachta). Although by the 18th century their importance was diminished by the collapse of the Polish military system and not by the introduction of modern infantry firearms and quick-firing artillery, the Polish hussars' tactics and armament remained almost unchanged until they were absorbed into the National Cavalry regiments in the 1770s.

At first hussars performed most services but as they grew heavier the need arose for a medium or lighter cavalry. The 16th century saw creation of lighter cavalry known as 'Kozacy' (singular 'Kozak' hence 'towarzysz kozacki') until 1648 and then known as 'Pancerni' from the 1650s on until the 1770s, 'Kozacy Pancerni' can be translated as 'Armoured cossacks') in the Kingdom of Poland or 'Petyhorcy' in the Grand Duchy of Lithuania (the actual subject of the illustration) - whose offensive armament included a shorter 'demi-lance' ('dzida') or 'rohatyna', bow and arrows, war-ax, sabre in the 16th century and a pistol or two, a carbine in the 17th and 18th centuries. The lighter yet cavalry was created during the Muscovite Wars of the early 17th century, the most famous unit or type was known as Lisowczyk, after their commander Aleksander Lisowski, that fought in the 30 Years War as well. Along with these mentioned Polish or Lithuanian horsemen there were banners/companies of lighter cavalry drawn from Lithuanian Tatars (serving in their own banners under their precarious legal status), Romanian ("Wallachian"), Cheremis, Circassians (similar to Kozak/Pancerni) and Hungarians.

Uhlan fighting a foot soldier

The early 18th century saw the creation of yet another cavalry formation that influenced most European armies of the time: the uhlans. Initially light cavalry companies formed by Polish Tatars (the very word ulan came from Lithuanian Tartar surname that might have come from an honorific name for a young, skilled warrior known as oglan) for one of the magnates, Sapieha, the uhlans joined the forces of Augustus der Starke, the king of Poland-Lithuania-Saxony, and in early 1740s 18th century the first uhlan 'pulks' (regiments) - known as uhlans - were formed for his son, king Augustus III. The uhlans were light cavalry armed with lances, sabres and pistols, which gave them enough power and at the same time adding to their versatility and manoeuvrability. In addition, the Polish uhlans, or ułani as they were called in their native tongue, introduced a new uniform style composed of a colourful jacket with a coloured panel in the front, dark trousers with colourful stripes on the sides and a high, pointed cap called czapka (often rendered chapska in English).

== 19th century: the Napoleonic and Partition Eras ==
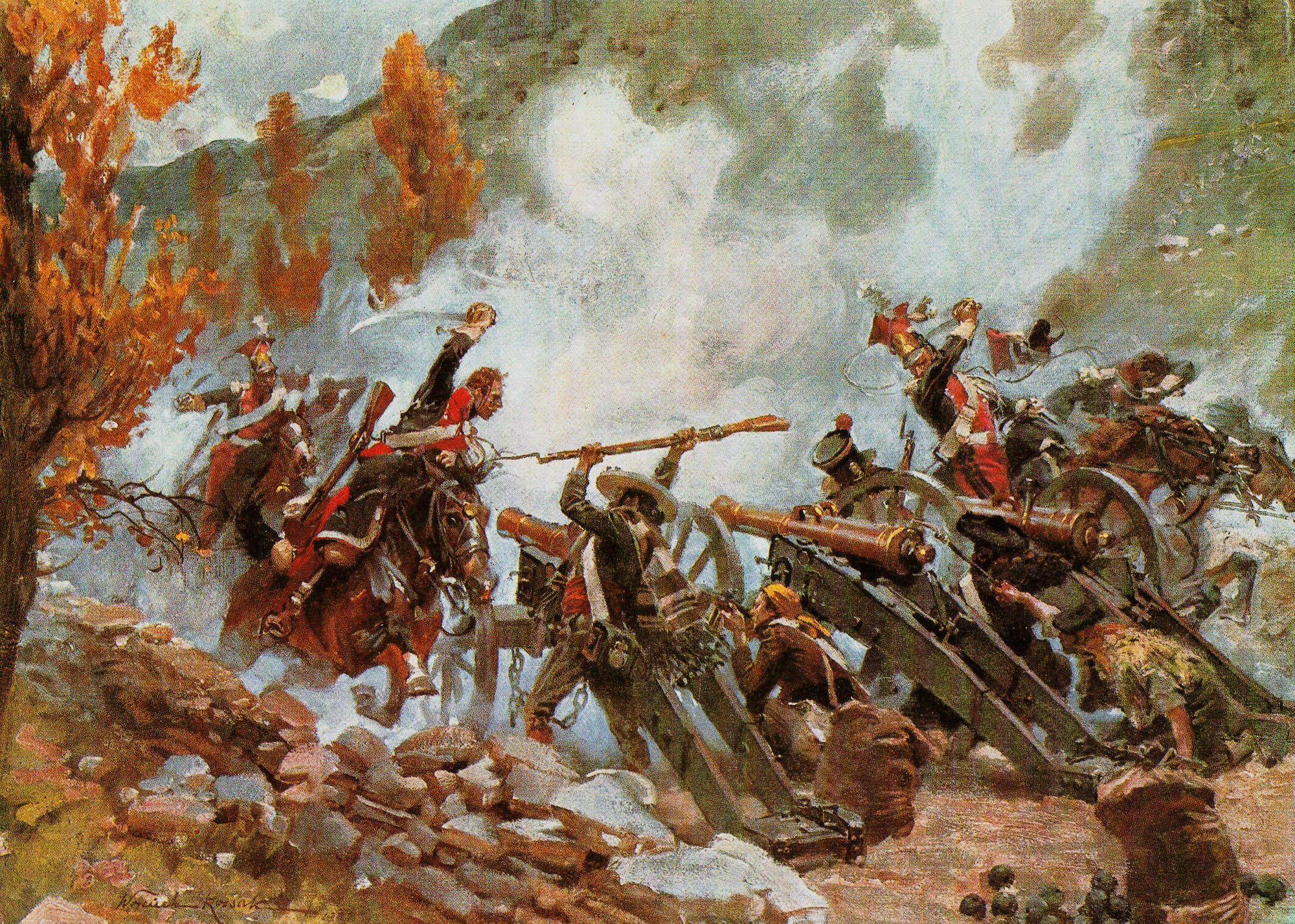
Battle of Somosierra, one of greatest successes of 19th-century Polish cavalry

With the advent of the 19th century Poland was partitioned by her neighbours. However, the Polish army was not disbanded and instead most of it was simply drafted into the armies of the occupying countries. Thanks to that, the Polish cavalry traditions were retained. After the creation of Duchy of Warsaw, many Poles volunteered for the Polish cavalry units fighting in the Napoleonic Wars alongside the French army.

The new formation of uhlans proved to be not only fast and effective, but also very influential: during the Napoleonic Wars the uhlans of the Duchy of Warsaw were among the most effective cavalry units and by the end of that period most of European states copied both their tactics and their uniforms. Together with the French, the Polish cavalry took part in many of the most notable battles of the Napoleonic period, including the battles of Smolensk, Fuengirola, Raszyn, and many others. Also, the Polish cavalrymen were the first unit of the Napoleon's Grande Armée to enter Moscow Kremlin during the Napoleon's invasion of Russia. Finally, the Polish cavalry detachments were also present in Haiti, where they helped the French administration to quell a slave revolt. However, perhaps the most notable success of the Polish cavalry in that period (and certainly the best known) is the Battle of Somosierra, a part of the Peninsular War.

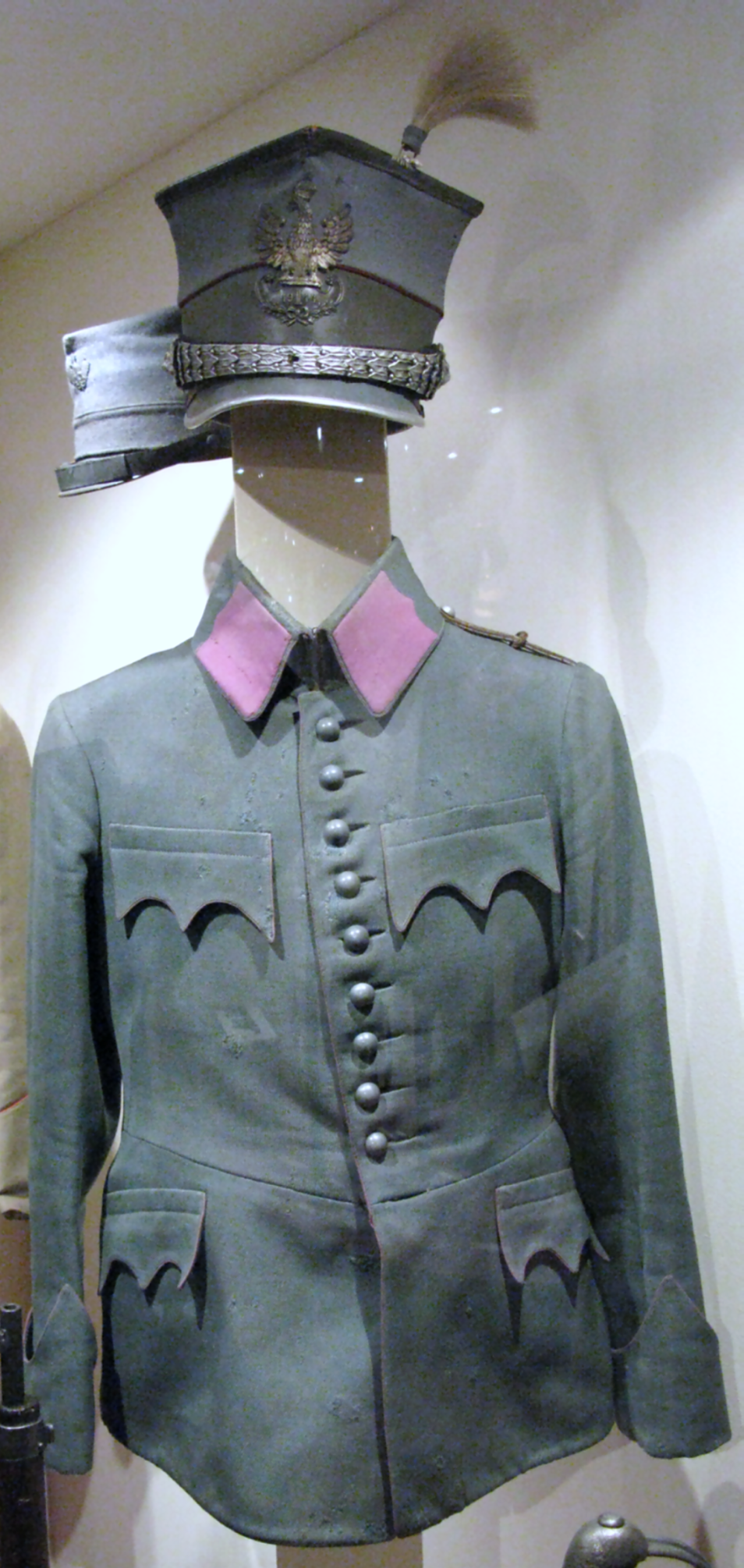
Uniform of 2nd Uhlan Regiment of Polish Legions (1914–1918)

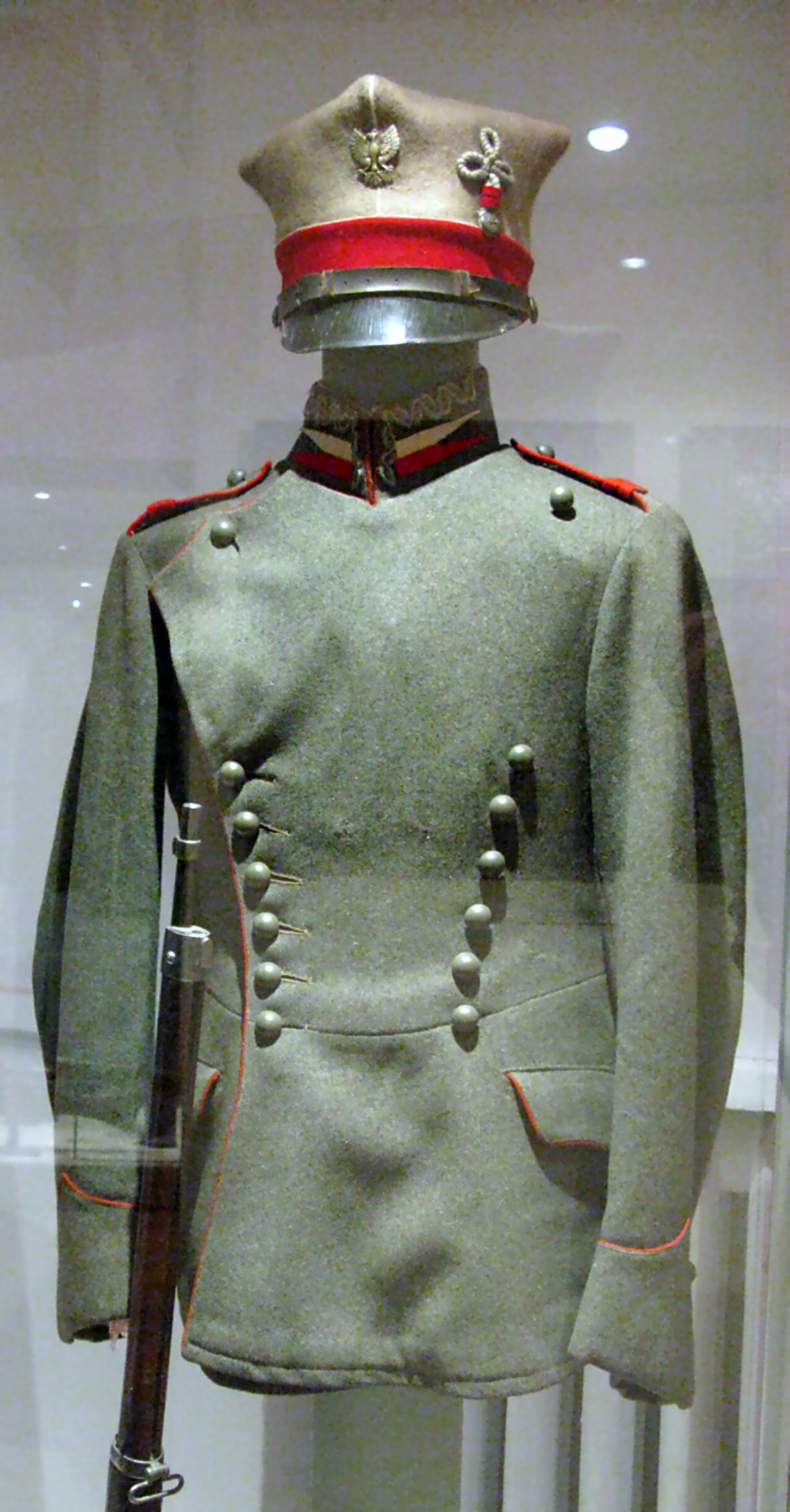
Jacket and hat of lance corporal of 1st Greater Poland Uhlans Reg. aka 15th Uhlans Regiment

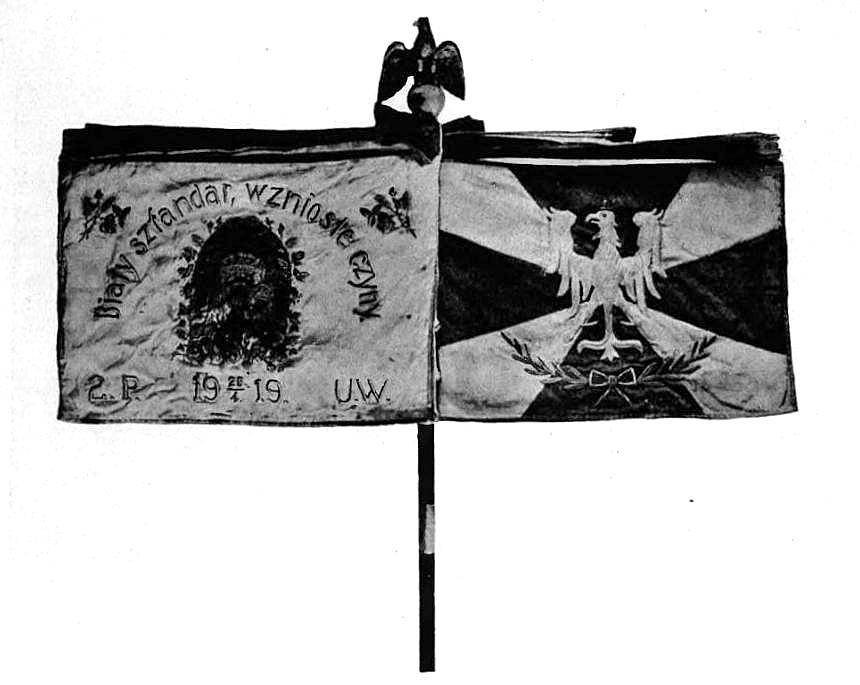
Banner of 16th Greater Poland Uhlan Regiment

During his advance on Madrid, Napoleon was blocked on 30 November 1808 by 9,000 Spaniards under General San Juan in the valley of Somosierra in the Sierra de Guadarrama. Because of the rough and uneven terrain, the Spanish forces could not easily be outflanked. Their positions were well-fortified and guarded with artillery. Impatient to proceed towards Madrid, Napoleon ordered his Polish light cavalry escort of some 87 troops, led by Jan Kozietulski, to charge the Spaniards. Despite losing two thirds of their numbers, the Poles succeeded in forcing the defenders to abandon their position.

Cavalry units were employed by the Poles in both November uprising and in later January uprising. During the January uprising, each insurgent unit possessed a cavalry force meant for scouting and screening. The cavalry followed a mixture of Polish and French traditions. The armaments were composed of pistols, lances and sabres; rear ranks of the soldiers also carried carabines.

== 20th century ==
=== The Polish-Soviet War ===
In November 1918 Poland was re-established following World War I, there were already several Polish cavalry units existing. Some of them were created as parts of either Austro-Hungarian or German Armies while others were created in Russia and as part of the French-based Blue Army. Because of that, each cavalry unit in the reborn Polish Army used different uniforms, different equipment and different strategy. However, all of the units shared the same traditions and, despite all the differences, were able to cooperate on the battlefield.

In late January 1919, the reorganisation of the Polish Army began. All previously-existent cavalry squadrons were pressed into 14 newly formed cavalry regiments, which in turn were joined into six cavalry brigades after 7 March 1919. Later a seventh brigade was added and some of the brigades were joined into two semi-independent cavalry divisions.

The newly recreated Polish Cavalry units were of modern type and were trained in both cavalry tactics and in trench warfare. After the Polish-Soviet War broke out, these were one of the very few combat-ready troops in Polish service. The lack of advanced military equipment on both sides of the front made the cavalry a decisive weapon in breaking the enemy lines and encircling the Russian units. In addition, smaller cavalry detachments (usually squadron-sized) were attached to every infantry brigade and served as reconnaissance and support units. Also, the lack of sophisticated equipment made the traditional role of the cavalry once again important. The Polish cavalry units were equipped with sabres, lances and all types of armament that were typically used by the cavalry in previous centuries.

During the war, the Polish cavalry brigades and divisions took part in most of the notable battles, including the pivotal Battle of Warsaw, in which they played a crucial role in surrounding the withdrawing Red Army, and in the Battle of the Niemen, in which the cavalry was vital in breaking the enemy lines near Grodno. However, the most important cavalry battle took place on 31 August 1920 near the village of Komarowo near Zamość. The battle was a complete disaster for the Soviet 1st Cavalry Army which sustained heavy casualties and barely avoided being totally surrounded. After that battle, the 1st Cavalry Army's morale had collapsed and the army, which was one of the most feared of the Soviet troops, was no longer considered an effective fighting force. Because of the numbers of forces involved, the Battle of Komarów is considered the greatest cavalry battle of the 20th century. Along with the battles then taking place in south Russia, this was one of the last battles fought mostly by cavalry units, in which traditional cavalry tactics were used and sabers and lances played a vital role. Because of that, it is sometimes referred to (by Poles) as "the greatest cavalry battle after 1813" and the last cavalry battle.

=== World War II ===
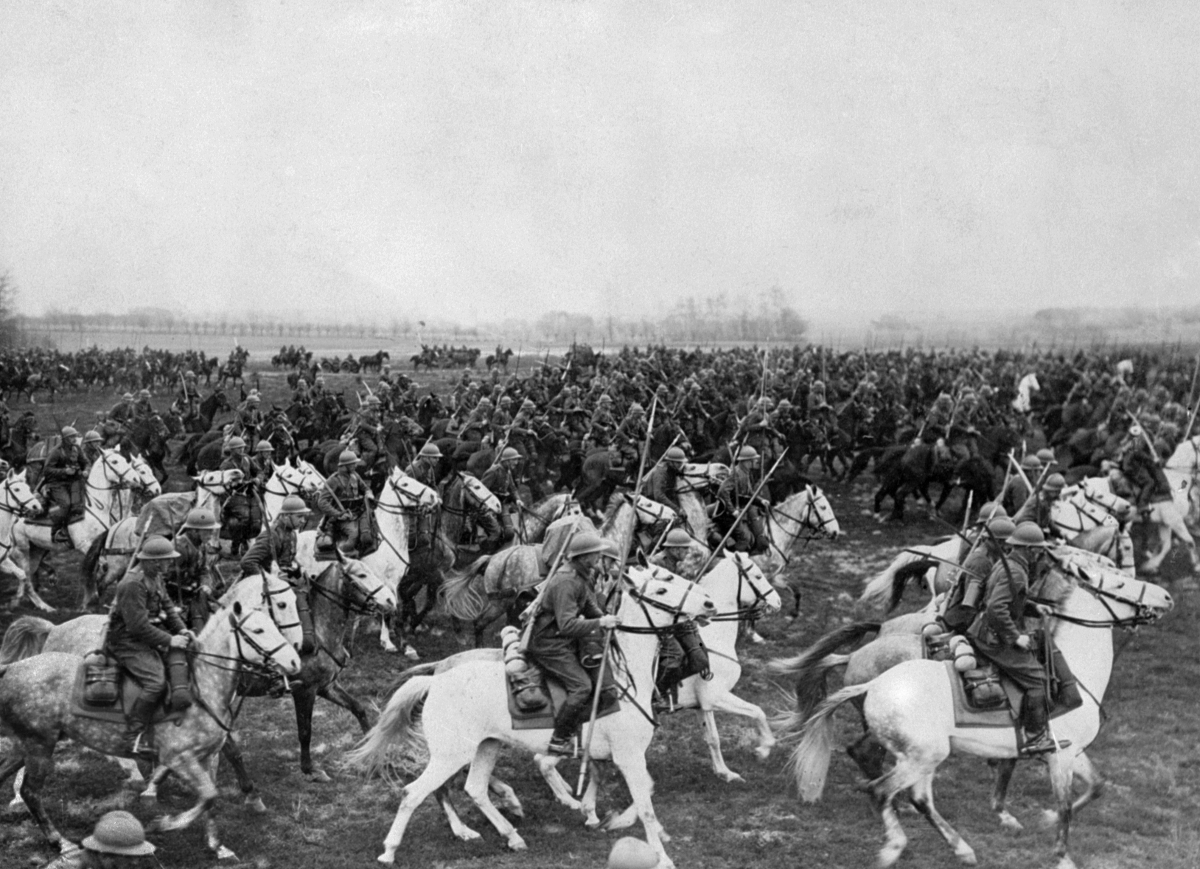
Polish cavalry in the 1930s.

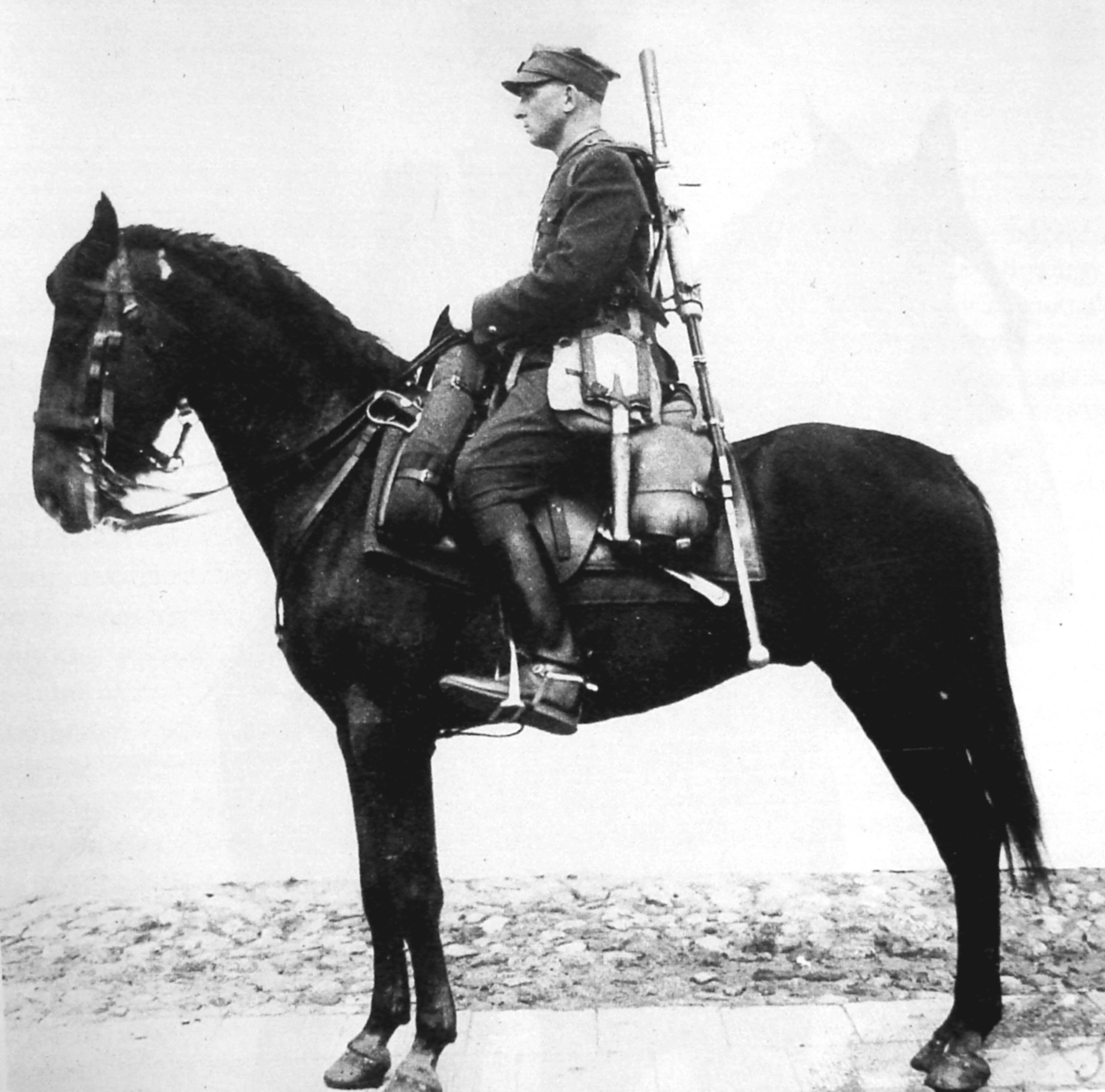
Polish uhlan with wz. 35 anti-tank rifle. Military instruction published in Warsaw in 1938.

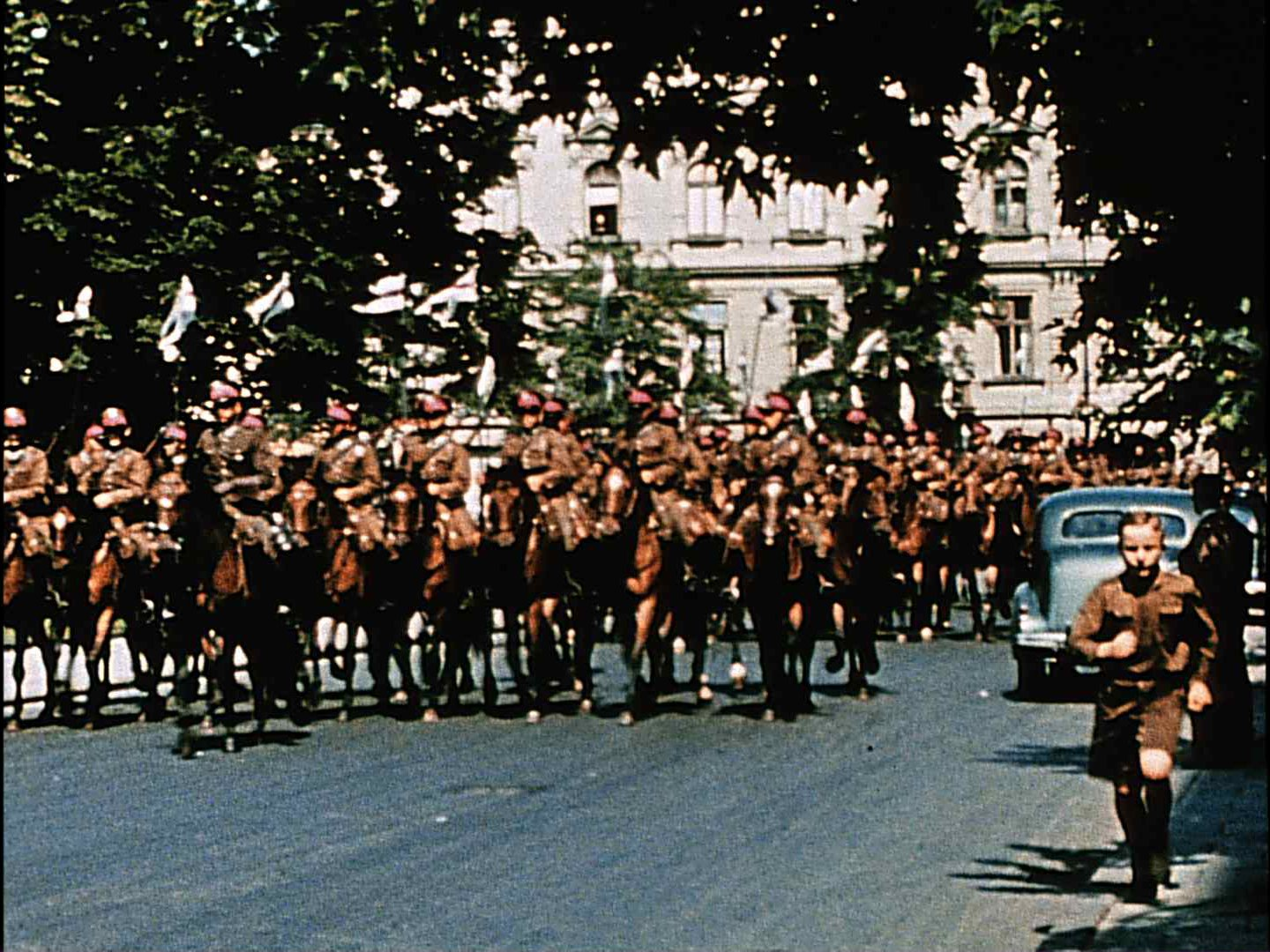
Cavalry of Poland during a parade in Warsaw, August 1939.

During the German invasion of Poland in 1939, cavalry formed 10% of the Polish Army. Cavalry units were organised in 11 cavalry brigades, each composed of 3 to 4 cavalry regiments with organic artillery, armoured unit and infantry battalion. Two additional brigades had recently been converted to motorized and armoured units, but they retained their cavalry traditions. In addition, every infantry division had an organic cavalry detachment used for reconnaissance.

In contrast with its traditional role in armed conflicts of the past (even in the Polish-Soviet War), the cavalry was no longer seen as a unit capable of breaking through enemy lines. Instead, it was used as a mobile reserve of the Polish armies and was using mostly infantry tactics: the soldiers dismounted before the battle and fought as a standard infantry. Despite media reports of the time, particularly in respect of the Battle of Krojanty, no cavalry charges were made by the Polish Cavalry against German tanks. The Polish cavalry, however, was successful against the German tanks in the Battle of Mokra. The Polish cavalry did not discard the lance as a weapon until 1934 or 1937 and continued to use it for training purposes up to the outbreak of World War II.

Although the cavalrymen retained their Szabla wz. 1934 sabres, after 1934 or 1937 the lance ceased to be issued as a combat weapon and was retained for training purposes only. Instead, the cavalry units were equipped with modern armament, including 75 mm guns, tankettes, 37mm AT guns, 40mm AA guns, anti-tank rifles and other pieces of modern weaponry.

During the campaign, the brigades were distributed among the Polish armies and served as mobile reserves. In this role, the Polish cavalry proved itself a successful measure in filling the gaps in the front and covering the withdrawal of friendly units. Polish cavalry units took part in most of the battles of 1939 and on several occasions proved to be the elite of the Polish Army.

After the September Campaign, the Polish Army on the Western Front continued its pre-war tradition of Uhlan regiments giving their names to armoured units, while Polish units on the Eastern Front used cavalry as mobile infantry until the end of the war.

After the German invasion of the Soviet Union, several Polish units, including cavalry forces, were formed by the Soviets. One of these units carried out the last Polish cavalry charge at the Battle of Schoenfeld, where a surprise cavalry assault succeeded in overrunning the German defensive positions.

=== After World War II ===
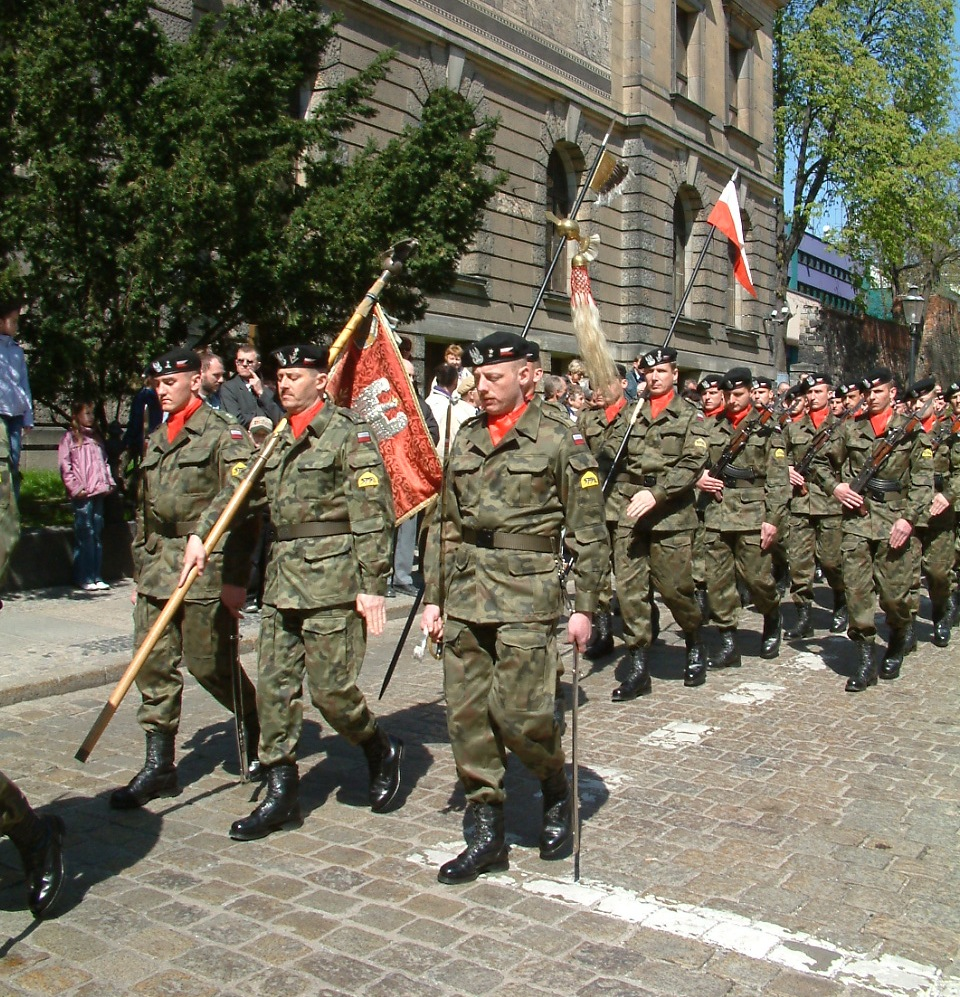
Soldiers of 1st Tank Battalion (1. batalion czołgów) of 15th Greater Polish Brigade of Armoured Cavalry (15. Wielkopolskiej Brygady Kawalerii Pancernej) - continuatirs of tradition of 15th Poznań Uhlans Regiment (15. Pułk Ułanów Poznańskich)

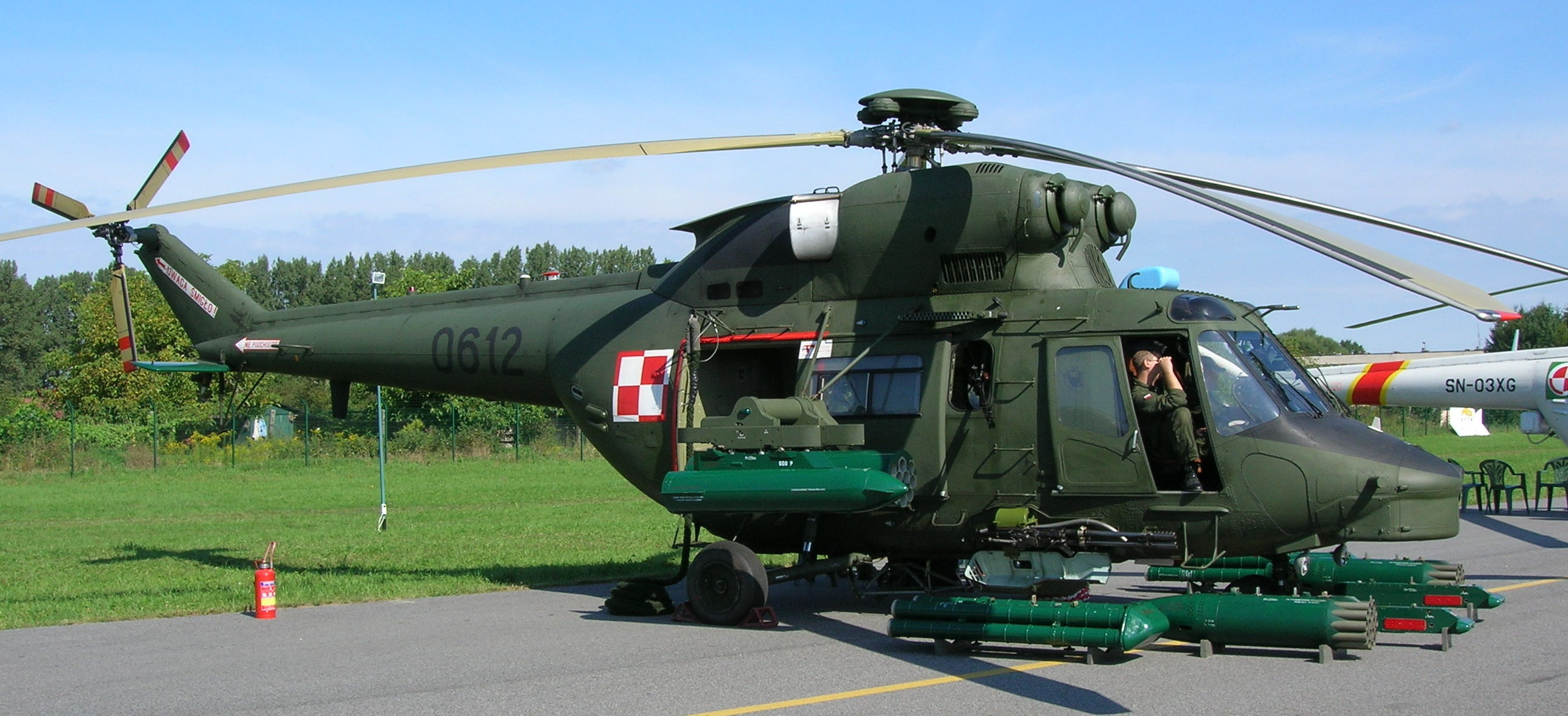
PZL W-3WA Sokół from 66 Airforce Squadron (66. Dywizjon Lotniczy) of 25th Aeromobile Cavalry Brigade (25. Brygada Kawalerii Powietrznej)

Combat cavalry units existed in the Polish Army until 27 January 1947, when the 1st Warsaw Cavalry Division was disbanded. The last Polish cavalry unit, the Representative Squadron of the President of Poland, was disbanded in July 1948. However, after several years of gathering funds, a group of enthusiasts formed in 2000 the Representative Squadron of Cavalry of the Polish Army. The unit is under the auspices of the army, which thus returned to its cavalry tradition. The squadron is present at most official anniversary celebrations in Warsaw, as well as other towns of Poland. In other places people are forming reenactment groups that continues, often with help of army, the traditions of local cavalry units. An example of such a society is the Volunteer Representative Squadron of City of Poznań which is a tribute to the 15th Poznań Uhlans Regiment. These remained until the Eastern Bloc collapsed, as the Soviet Union collapsed too. Afterwards, The Polish military was freely able to expand, or follow whatever perimeters it wanted.

The combat traditions of Polish cavalry are continued by the armoured (Kawaleria Pancerna) and aeromobile (Kawaleria Powietrzna) units of Polish Land Forces.

== Cavalry charges and propaganda ==
Apart from countless battles and skirmishes in which the Polish cavalry units fought dismounted, there were 16 confirmed cavalry charges during the 1939 war. Contrary to common belief, most of them were successful.

The first and perhaps best known cavalry charge happened on 1 September 1939, during the Battle of Krojanty. During this action, elements of the 18th Pomeranian Uhlan Regiment met a large group of German infantry resting in the woods near the village of Krojanty. Colonel Mastalerz decided to take the enemy by surprise and immediately ordered a cavalry charge, a tactic the Polish cavalry rarely used as their main weapon. The charge was successful and the German infantry unit was dispersed.

The same day, German war correspondents were brought to the battlefield together with two journalists from Italy. They were shown the battlefield, the corpses of Polish cavalrymen and their horses, alongside German tanks that had arrived at the field of battle only after the engagement. One of the Italian correspondents sent home an article, in which he described the bravery and heroism of Polish soldiers, who charged German tanks with their sabres and lances. Other possible source of the myth is a quote from Heinz Guderian's memoirs, in which he asserted that the Pomeranian Brigade had charged on German tanks with swords and lances. Although such a charge did not happen and there were no tanks used during the combat, the myth was disseminated by German propaganda during the war with a staged Polish cavalry charge shown in their 1941 reel called "Geschwader Lützow".

Even such prominent German writers as Günter Grass, later accused of anti-Polonism by Jan Józef Lipski among others, were falling victims to this Nazi deception. Grass wrote the following passage, somewhat metaphorically, in his famous novel The Tin Drum:

"O insane cavalry!—picking blueberries on horseback. With wimpled lances, red and white. Squadrons of melancholy and tradition. Picture-book charges. Over the fields of Lodz and Kuno. Modlin, freeing the fortress. Galloping so brilliantly. Always awaiting the setting sun. Only then does the cavalry attack, when both foreground and background are splendid, for battle is so picturesque, and Death the artist's model, one leg engaged and one leg free, then plunging, nibbling blueberries, rose- hips tumble and burst, release the itch that spurs the cavalry to charge. Uhlans, itching again, wheel their horses about where shocks of straw are standing—this too a striking image—and gather round a man called Don Quixote in Spain, but this one's name is Pan Kichot, a pureblood Pole of sad and noble mien, who's taught his uhlans how to kiss a lady's hand on horseback, so now they always kiss the hand of Death as if he were a lady, but gather first with sunset at their backs—for atmosphere and mood are their reserves—the German tanks before them, stallions from the stud farms of Krupp von Bohlen and Halbach, nobler steeds there never were. But that half-Spanish, half-Polish knight so in love with death—brilliant Pan Kichot, too brilliant—lowers his red-white wimpled lance, bids you all to kiss the lady's hand, cries out so that the evening glows, red-white storks clatter on the rooftops, cherries spit out their pits, and he cries to the cavalry, "Ye noble Poles on horseback, those are not tanks of steel, they are windmills or sheep. I bid you all to kiss the lady's hand!"

On 1 September 2009 Sir Simon Jenkins, writing for The Guardian newspaper's website, characterised the notion of pitting Polish cavalry against tanks as "the most romantic and idiotic act of suicide of modern war." On 21 September 2009, The Guardian was forced to publish an admission that his article "repeated a myth of the second world war, fostered by Nazi propagandists, when it said that Polish lancers turned their horses to face Hitler's panzers. There is no evidence that this occurred."

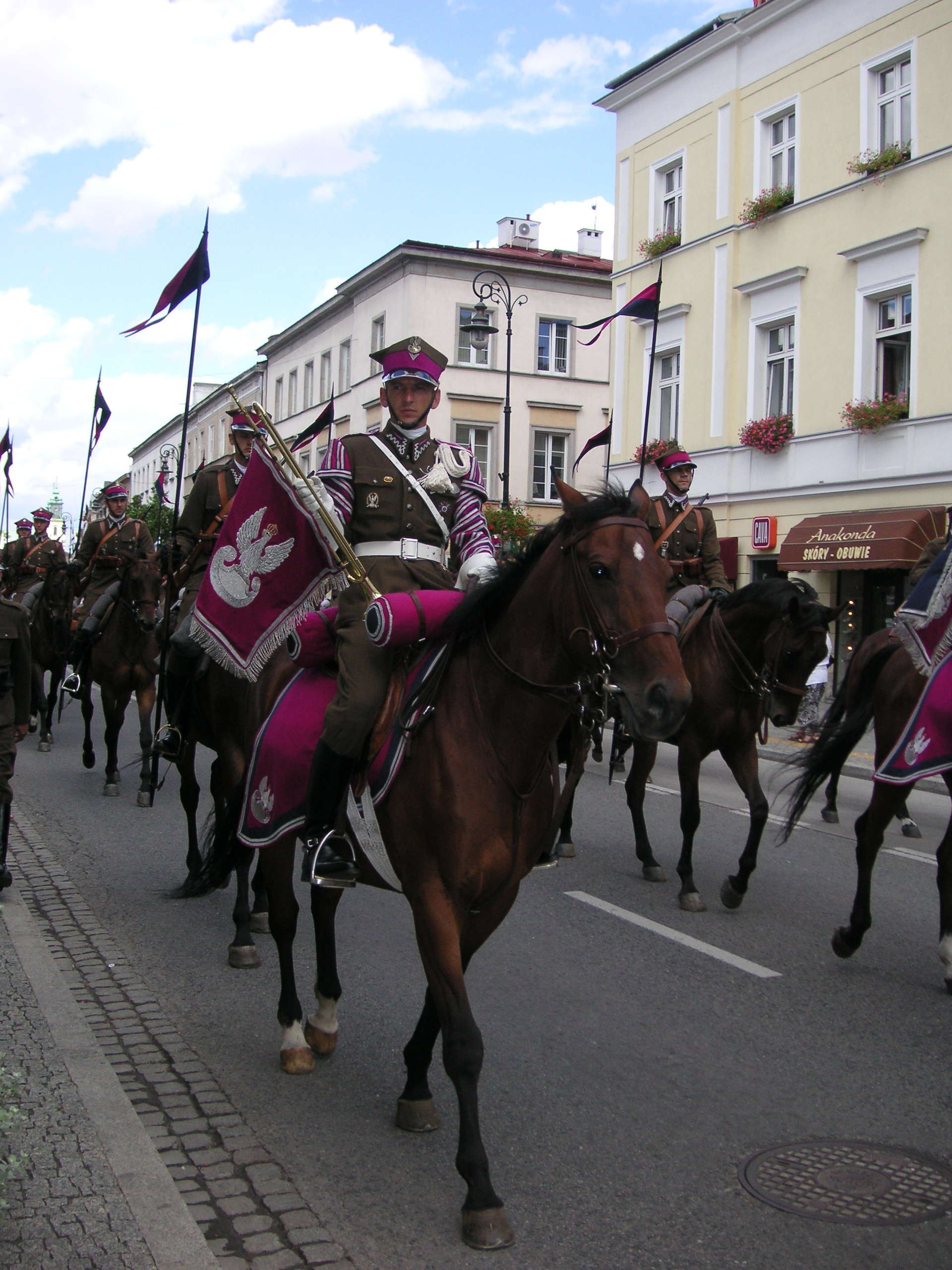
"Representative Cavalry Squadron of Polish Army" on military parade in Warsaw commemorating the Feast of the Polish Army 2006

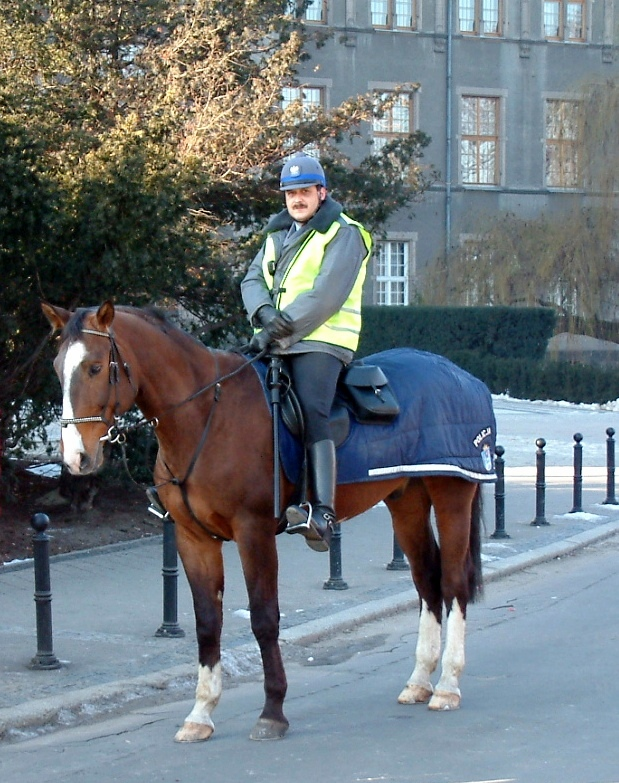
Polish Mounted Police city of Poznań

Other cavalry charges of 1939 were as follows:

1. September 1 - Battle of Mokra - 19th Volhynian Uhlan Regiment took by surprise the elements of German 4th Panzer Division, which retreated in panic. During the charge, lances were used. In fact, the cavalry charge in the traditional sense was neither planned, nor executed. The mounted infantry rode over behind the attacking German armor in behind the tankettes with the tank men throwing smoke grenades to cover the approach. Indeed, the mounted infantry did repel the German support infantry and forced part of the German armored regiment to continue to advance while deprived of the infantry support.
2. September 1 - Battle of Lasy Królewskie - 11th Legions Uhlan Regiment on a reconnaissance mission encountered a similar unit of German cavalry. Lieut. Kossakowski ordered a cavalry charge, but the enemy did not accept battle and after a short clash withdrew towards their positions.
3. September 2 - Battle of Borowa Góra - 1st squadron of the 19th Volhynian Uhlan Regiment encountered a squadron of German cavalry in the village of Borowa. A charge was ordered, but the Germans withdrew.
4. September 11 - Osuchowo - 1st squadron of the 20th Uhlan Regiment of King Jan III Sobieski charged through the German infantry lines to avoid encirclement, and broke through. There were negligible losses on both sides.
5. September 11–12 - Kałuszyn - 4th squadron of the 11th Legions Uhlan Regiment charged overnight at the German positions in the town of Kałuszyn. Although the charge was a mistake (the Polish infantry commander issued a wrong order which was understood as a charge order while the cavalry was meant to simply move forward), it was a success. After heavy casualties on both sides, the town was retaken in the early morning.
6. September 13 - Mińsk Mazowiecki - 1st squadron of the 2nd Grochow Uhlan Regiment charged German infantry positions, but was repelled by German MG and artillery fire.
7. September 13 - Maliszewo - 1st squadron of the 27th Uhlan Regiment was engaged in heavy fighting near the village of Maliszewo. After the Germans were beaten and started to retreat towards the village, the Poles charged and took the village along with a large number of German prisoners.
8. September 15 - Brochów - elements of the 17th Greater Poland Uhlan Regiment charged towards the German positions to frighten the enemy infantry. Shortly before reaching the range of enemy weapons, they dismounted and continued their assault on foot; the attack was successful.
9. September 16 - Dembowskie - a platoon from the 4th squadron of the 17th Greater Poland Uhlan Regiment charged towards a small German outpost located around a foresters' hut. The small number of Germans withdrew.
10. September 19 - Battle of Wólka Węglowa - Most of the 14th Jazlowiec Uhlan Regiment (without its MGs and AT platoon) was ordered to probe the German lines near the town of Wólka Węglowa. After elements of 9th Lesser Poland Uhlan Regiment arrived, the group was ordered to charge through the German lines to open the way towards Warsaw and Modlin for the rest of Polish forces who were withdrawing from the Battle of Bzura. The Poles charged through a German artillery barrage and took the German infantry by surprise. Polish losses were high (205 killed and wounded), the German losses remain unknown, but the Polish unit broke through and was the first to reach Warsaw after the Battle of Bzura.
11. September 19 - Łomianki - recce squad of 6th Mounted Artillery Detachment charged through the German lines in the town of Lomianki and paved the way for the rest of the unit to Warsaw.
12. September 21 - Battle of Kamionka Strumiłowa - 3rd squadron of the 1st Mounted Detachment (improvised) charged through German infantry who were preparing to assault the Polish positions. The preparations were paralysed and the Germans withdrew.
13. September 23 - Krasnobród - 1st squadron of the 25th Greater Poland Uhlan Regiment charged towards the town of Krasnobród. After heavy casualties, they reached the hilltop on which the town was located. A unit of German organic cavalry from the German 8th Infantry Division countercharged from the hill, but was repelled and the Poles captured the town and took the HQ of the division, together with its commander and about 100 German soldiers. 40 Polish combatants previously taken prisoner by the Germans were also freed.
14. September 24 - Husynne - reserve squadron of the 14th Jazlowiec Uhlan Regiment (some 500 sabres), reinforced with an improvised cavalry unit of police and some remnants of divisional organic cavalry, was ordered to break through the Soviet infantry surrounding the Polish positions in the village of Husynne. The charge was led by the mounted police, and the Soviet forces withdrew in panic. However, the attack was soon halted by a strong Soviet tank unit. Casualties were similar on both sides.
15. September 26 - Morańce - 27th Uhlan Regiment twice charged an entrenched German infantry battalion in the village of Morańce. Both charges were repelled with heavy casualties (the Poles lost 20 KIA and about 50 wounded, German losses are unknown). After the second charge the Germans sent out a soldier with a white flag and, after a short discussion with the Polish commander of the Nowogródek Cavalry Brigade, the Germans withdrew.

== Present time ==
In Poland there are now several Volunteer Representative Squadrons. The Polish Army also has a "Representative Cavalry Squadron of the Polish Army" (Polish: Reprezentacyjny Szwadron Kawalerii Wojska Polskiego).

== See also ==
- Battle of Kircholm
- Battle of Klushino
- Battle of Vienna
- Battle of Somosierra
- Battle of Komarów
- Battle of Mokra
- Polish cavalry brigade order of battle
- Mazowiecka Cavalry Brigade {1st Cavalry Brigade}
- Nowogródzka Cavalry Brigade {Baranowicze Cavalry Brigade}
- Podlaska Cavalry Brigade XI Brygada Kawalerii
- Podolska Cavalry Brigade {6th Independent Cavalry Brigade}
- Pomeranian Cavalry Brigade {Cavalry Brigade "Bydgoszcz"}
- Wielkopolska Cavalry Brigade {Cavalry Brigade "Poznan"}
- Charge of Rokitna
