= Attack on Szołomyń =

Attack on Szołomyń was a retaliatory action carried out by the forest units of the Home Army in a force of about 100 men in Szołomyń in the Lwów Voivodeship on the night of 10–11 June 1944. The Home Army units burnt down about 55-60 households in the so-called "deterrent action". An unspecified number of Ukrainians were killed as a result of the attack (figures ranging from "at least 4" to "several dozen" are given).

== Before attack ==
As Ukrainian Insurgent Army units were approaching Lwów, a sign of which were the assaults on more Polish villages, the Home Army command in Lviv decided to resume "repressive and preventive actions". One of the first targets of these actions was to be the village of Szolomyja, identified as an UPA base. The date of the attack was set for 10/11 June, from Saturday to Sunday. The village was to be destroyed without regard to defence, but possibly avoiding civilian casualties. Sub-units of the 14th Regiment of Uhlans of the Home Army were to take part in the attack, as well as volunteers from the neighbouring villages of Czyszek, Winniczek, Gańczar, Biłki Królewska, and Dawidów and Zubrza, in the number of approximately one hundred men, under the command of Dragan Sotirović "Draży".

== The course of action according to Home Army sources ==
During the night from Friday to Saturday, AK soldiers confessed in the church in Czyszki. On Saturday evening about 100 soldiers and volunteers set off from Czyszki in the direction of Szołomyi. In Dawidów, a group of AK soldiers encountered 2 Vlasov soldiers, 1 of whom was liquidated. This alerted the German soldiers, who opened inauspicious fire, however, causing the Poles to quickly retreat into the forest.

At dusk, the unit reached Szołomyi. A briefing with assignment of tasks took place 1 km before the village. Then Capt. "Draza" addressed the soldiers, mentioned the Polish victims. Then a prayer was said. The unit divided into two groups: the smaller one, commanded by Capt. "Draza", was to attack the village from the north, and the larger one, of about 80 men, from the south. The Poles, in order to be distinguished in the darkness, wore white armbands on their sleeves. Capt "Draza"'s group immediately encountered a Ukrainian outpost armed with a machine gun. It was eliminated without firing a shot and without losses. At this point, the second group attacked. No resistance was encountered and almost no villagers were encountered. Polish soldiers walking in a line threw grenades or petrol bottles through the windows of the huts. Only the Orthodox church was left.

After the action, the Home Army soldiers retreated with 2 slightly wounded. One missing man got lost, and returned to the unit the next day.

== Consequences of the attack ==
As Jerzy Węgierski states, "about the action in Szołomyja there appeared fantastic news in conspiracy publications, in some details". The author considers the information about the capture of 735 cattle in Szołomyja unbelievable. In his opinion, a figure of 100 cattle taken and 55-60 burned farms is closer to reality. Węgierski notes that according to AK estimates, between nine and several dozen Ukrainians were killed in Szołomyi. In his opinion, they may have suffocated by smoke in the buildings that were set on fire.

According to Anna Fasntacht-Stupnicka, who researches the sources on the events in Szolomyi, the killed were the Uprising's own Ukrainians, and the local population survived by taking shelter in the Orthodox church. Kazimierz Krajewski also considers Szołomyja to be an "UPA base", whose defenders escaped after a brief exchange of fire.

The description of the events in Szołomyja as an attack on a heavily manned UPA outpost is disputed by Damian Markowski. In his opinion, it was a "typical pacification", as evidenced by the lack of resistance encountered by the surprised villagers. At the same time, Markowski, citing Ukrainian sources, estimates the number of victims of the attack at "at least 4, probably just civilians". In his opinion, the Home Army soldiers were probably trying to limit the number of victims of the attack.

Ihor Ilyushin calls the burning of Szołomyi "an anti-Ukrainian repressive action".

According to Fasntacht-Stupnitskaya, after these events, Ukrainian attacks on Poles near Szołomyi did not happen again.

== Bibliografia ==
- Ihor, Iljuszyn (2009). UPA i AK. Konflikt w Zachodniej Ukrainie (1939-1945) (in Polish). Warszawa: Warszawa. ISBN 978-83-928483-0-1.
- Kazimierz, Krajewski (2015). Na straconych posterunkach. Armia Krajowa na kresach wschodnich II Rzeczypospolitej 1939-1945 (in Polish). Kraków wydawnictwo Literackie: Kraków. ISBN 978-83-08-04932-7.
- Damian, Markowski (2023). W cieniu Wołynia. "Antypolska akcja" OUN i UPA w Galicji Wschodniej 1943-1945 (in Polish). Kraków wydawnictwo Literackie: Kraków. ISBN 978-83-08-08166-2.
- Jerzy, Węgierski (1989). W lwowskiej Armii Krajowej (in Polish). Kraków wydawnictwo Literackie: Kraków. ISBN 83-211-1044-4.
