= Sotirović =

Sotirović is a Serbian surname meaning "the son of Sotir" (Sotir, Greek: Sotirios) it may refer to:

- Kuzman Sotirović, Yugoslav Serb footballer
- Vuk Sotirović, Serbian footballer
- Katarina Sotirović, Serbian singer
- Dragan Sotirović, Captain of the Yugoslav Army
