= Battle of Wólka Węglowa =

1939 battle of the Invasion of Poland

Coordinates: 52°17′45″N 20°53′02″E

- Part of Invasion of Poland
Date	September 19, 1939
Location	Wólka Węglowa, Warsaw Voivodeship, Poland
Result	Polish victory

Belligerents
Poland	Germany

Commanders and leaders
(Second Polish Republic) Edward Godlewski	(Nazi Germany) Hans Schuber

Strength
2 cavalry regiments (1,000 men)	2,300 men and 37 tanks

Casualties and losses
105 killed 100 wounded	52 killed 70 wounded

The Battle of Wólka Węglowa (Polish: Bitwa pod Wólką Węglową) was a battle near Wólka Węglowa (near Warsaw) on September 19, 1939, during the last stages of the Polish counteroffensive (Battle of the Bzura) of the Invasion of Poland.

== Outcome ==
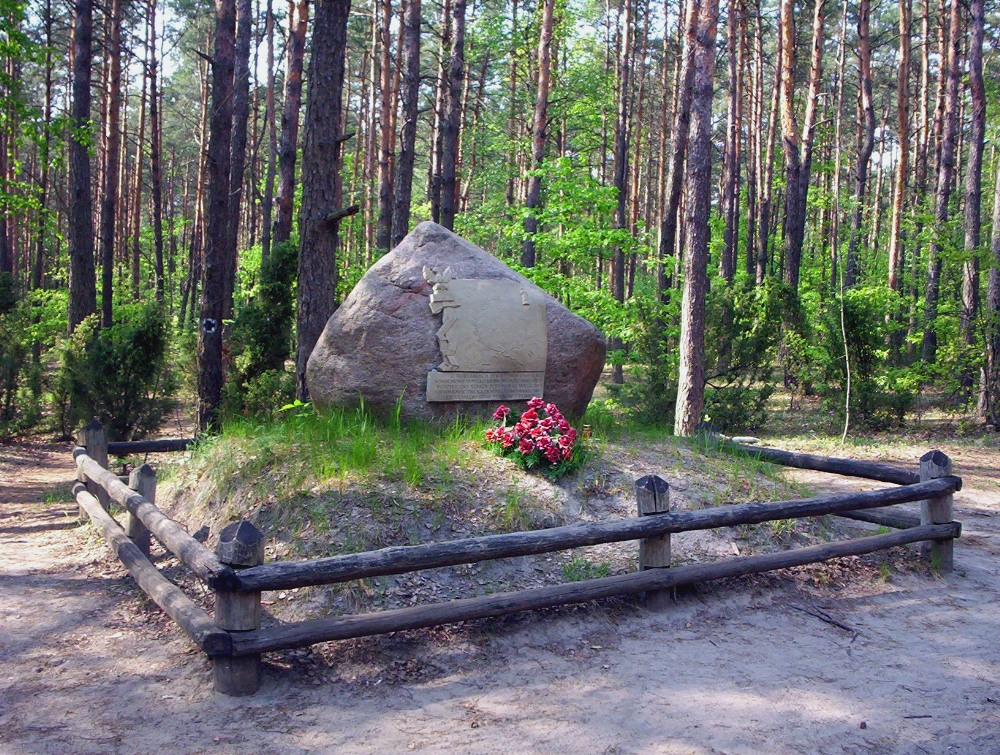
A monument commemorating the battle at Kampinos

The battle of Wólka Węglowa was a cavalry battle, as Polish Uhlan cavalry (14th Regiment of Jazlowiec Uhlans of Podolska Cavalry Brigade and elements of the 9th Regiment of Lesser Poland Uhlans) retreating towards Warsaw encountered German units. The commanding officer of the 14th Regiment, Col. Edward Godlewski ordered a cavalry charge. German infantry was taken by surprise, but machine guns and tanks hidden nearby opened fire on the cavalry. Eventually Polish units broke through towards Warsaw, as intended, but at the cost of heavy losses (105 killed, 100 wounded - about 20% of their initial strength).

The battle was witnessed and described by the Italian war correspondent Mario Appelius.

== See also ==
- List of World War II military equipment of Poland
- List of German military equipment of World War II
