= 6th Kaniow Uhlan Regiment =

Polish Uhlan regiment

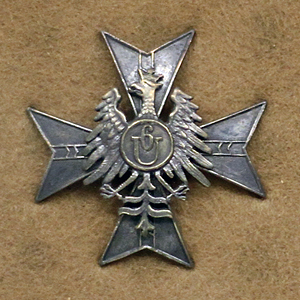
- Badge of the Regiment
- Active: 1917 – 12 May 1918; December 1918 – 1939
- Country: Russian Republic (1917-May 1918); Poland (December 1918-1939)
- Role: Cavalry
- Garrison/HQ: Stanisławów
- Engagements: World War I: Battle of Rarańcza; Battle of Kaniów; Polish-Soviet War; World War II: Invasion of Poland; Battle of Wólka Węglowa; Siege of Warsaw

6th Kaniow Uhlan Regiment (Polish language: 5 Pułk Ułanów Kaniowskich, 6 puł) was a cavalry unit of the Polish Army in the Second Polish Republic. It was garrisoned in the city of Stanisławów, and the regiment was named after the Battle of Kaniow.

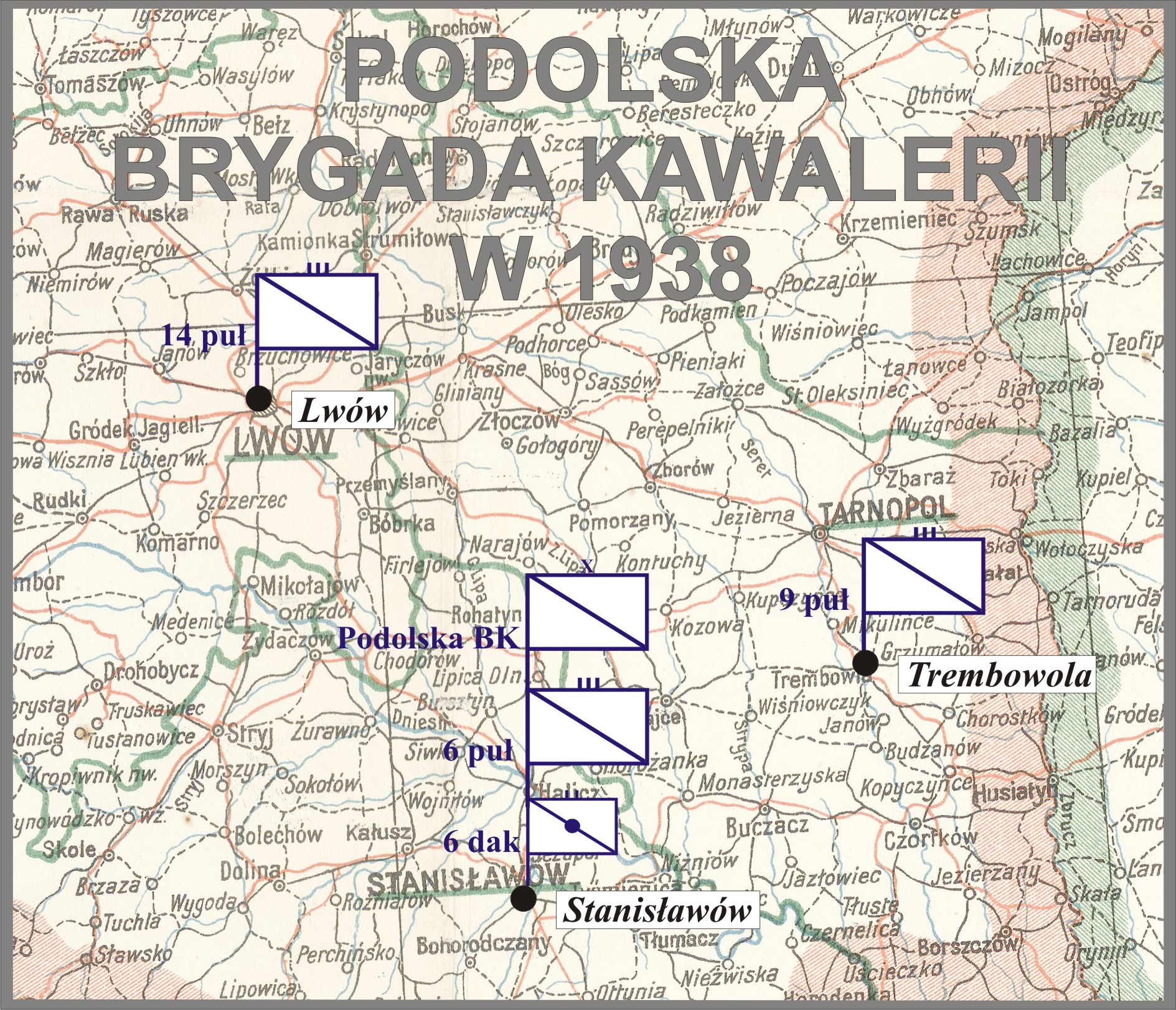
Podolska BK w 1938

The regiment was formed in 1917, as part of Polish II Corps in Russia, to be dissolved after the battle of Kaniow (May 12, 1918). Formed again in December 1918, as a merger of 6th Uhlan Regiment of Lwów Cavalry and 6th Uhlan regiment from Odessa. Its traditions were based on the 6th Duchy of Warsaw Uhlan Regiment and 6th Children of Warsaw Uhlan Regiment, both of which fought in the November Uprising.

In the Polish-Soviet War, the regiment fought in several battles in southeastern Poland, at Michnowo, Zasławiec, Nowo Konstantynów, Kumanowice and Lysa Gora. After that war it was garrisoned in Stanisławów. In the 1939 Invasion of Poland, the regiment was part of Podolska Cavalry Brigade, fighting mostly in central Poland (Uniejów, Sieraków, Jankow, Wolka Weglowa), and in the Siege of Warsaw (1939).

== Commandants ==
- Colonel Stefan Grabowski (1918)
- Major Wlodzimierz Kownacki (1919)
- Colonel Zdzislaw Kostecki (1919)
- Colonel Stefan Cienski (1919–1920)
- Colonel Stefan Grabowski (1920–1924)
- Colonel Mieczyslaw Rozalowski (1924–1928)
- Colonel Witold Radecki-Mikulicz (March 1928 – May 1930)
- Colonel Stefan Liszko (1930–1939)

== Sources ==
- Roman Abraham: Wspomnienia wojenne znad Warty i Bzury. Warszawa: Wydawnictwo Ministerstwa Obrony Narodowej, 1990. ISBN 83-11-07712-6 (War memories from the Warta and Bzura)

== See also ==
- Polish cavalry
