= 14th Jazlowiec Uhlan Regiment =

- 14 Pułk Ułanów Jazłowieckich
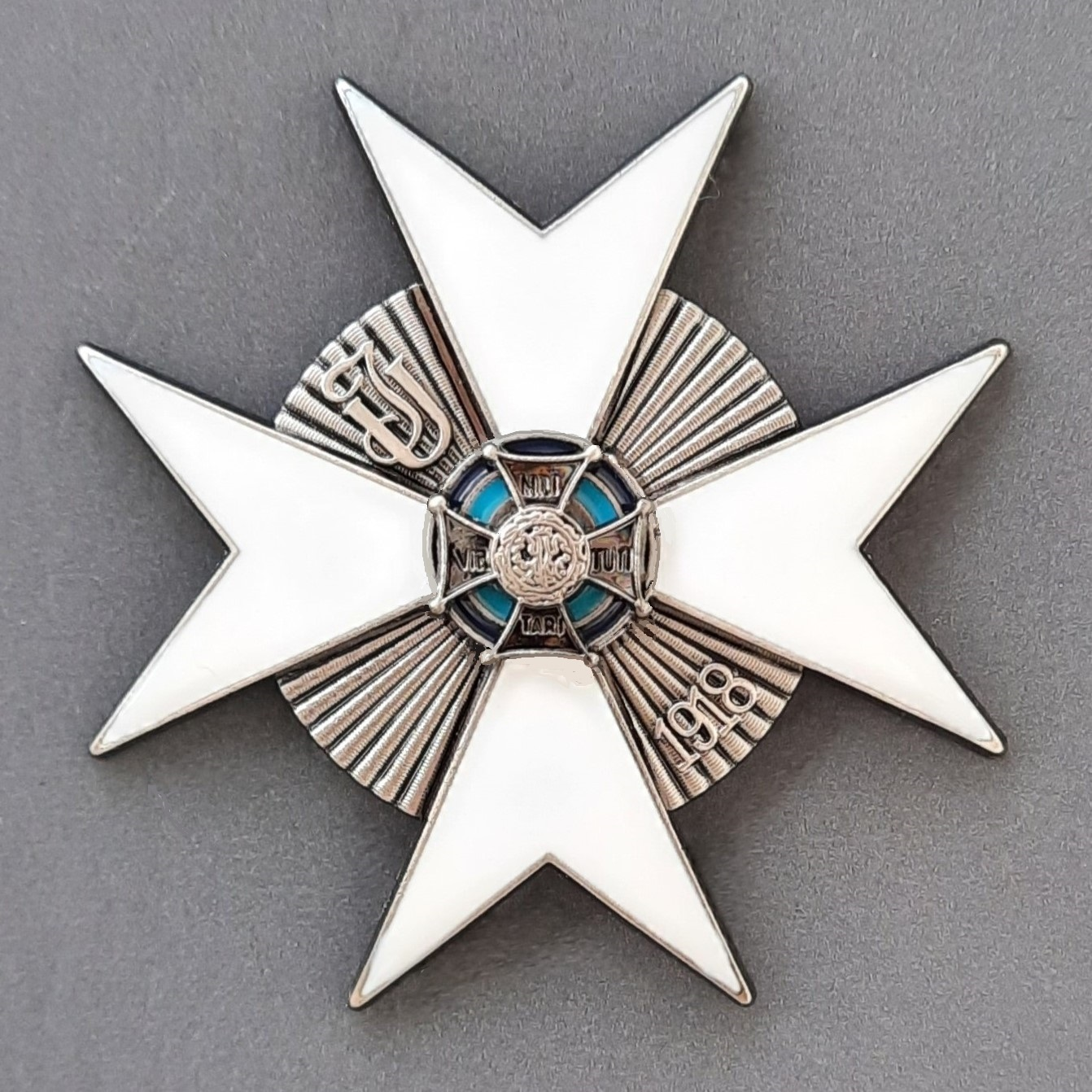
- Active: February 1918–September 1939
- Country: Poland
- Branch: Polish Armed Forces
- Type: Armoured
- Size: Regiment
- Garrison/HQ: Lvov
- Patron: NMP Jazłowiecka
- Anniversaries: 8 December (1918-1924); 11 July (1925-1939)

14th Jazłowiec Uhlan Regiment (Polish: 14 Pułk Ułanów Jazłowieckich, 14 puł) was a cavalry unit of the Polish Army in the Second Polish Republic, also a unit of Polish Armed Forces in the West and the Home Army. During the interbellum, the regiment garrisoned Lwów. It was named after the village of Yazlovets (Jazłowiec), where on July 11–13, 1919, one of the battles of the Polish–Ukrainian War took place.

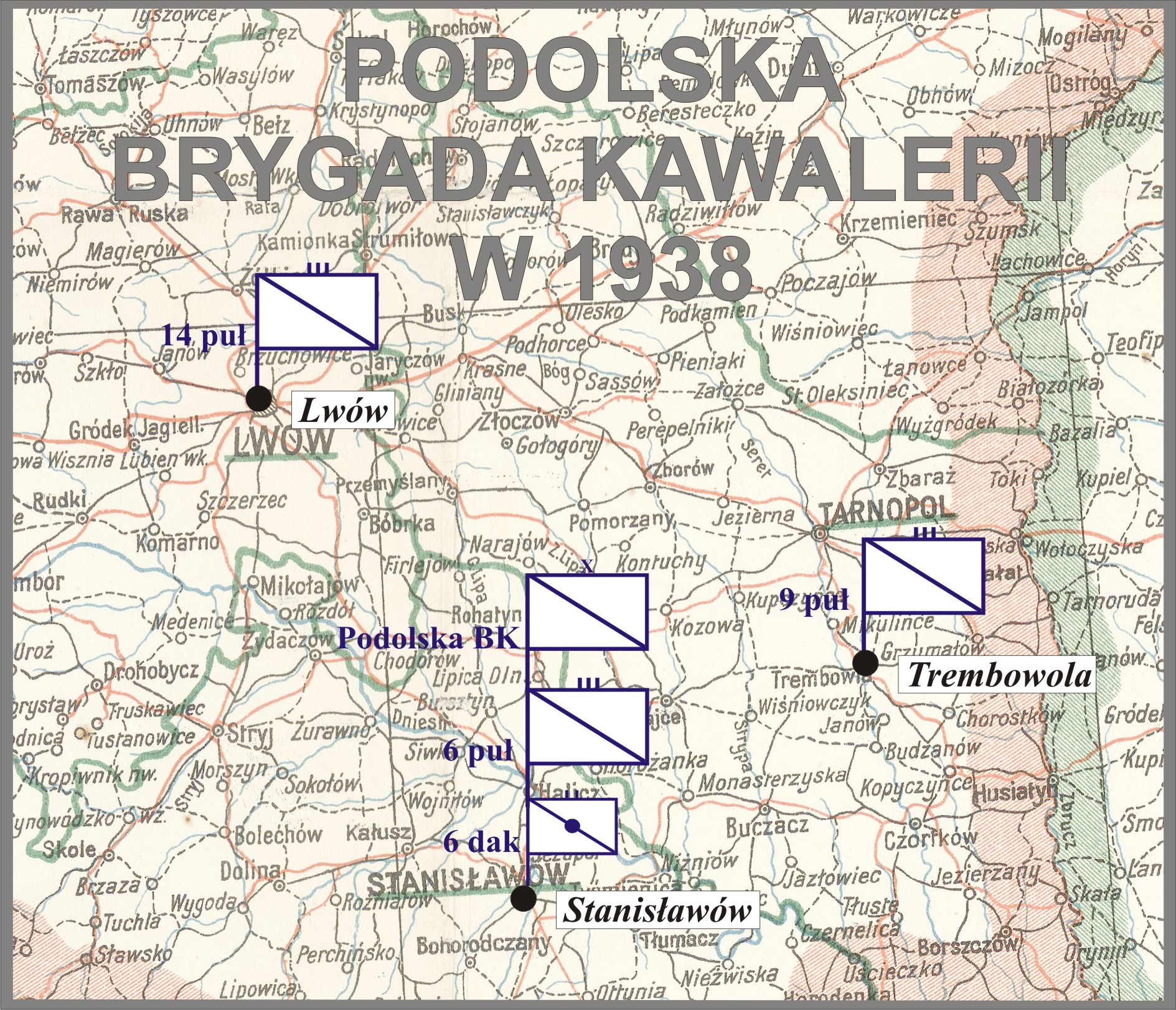
Podolska BK w 1938

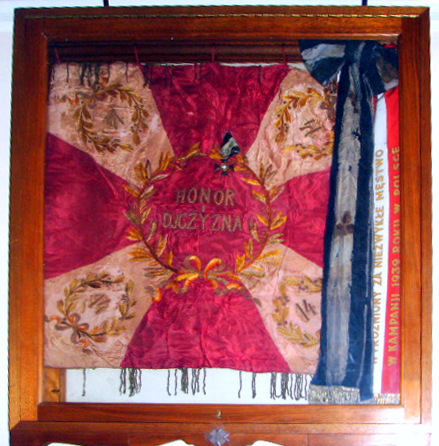
Regimental flag, kept at the Polish Institute and Sikorski Museum in London

== Beginnings ==
The regiment dates back to February 1918, when a Polish squadron was formed in the town of Ungheni, Moldova. This unit consisted of ethnic Poles, who had served in the Imperial Russian Army. After a failed attempt to join Polish II Corps in Russia, and facing a German disarming, the squadron joined the 2nd Mounted Regiment of Russian Volunteer Army, keeping its symbols and command. Together with other units of the White movement, the Polish squadron marched to Kuban in southern Russia, where it fought the Red Army.

In mid-August 1918, following an agreement between the Volunteer Army and General Lucjan Żeligowski, the unit was subjected to Polish military authorities of the Kuban region. Soon afterwards, it was reorganized into a two-squadron unit, commanded by Major Konstanty Plisowski (since September 1918). In October, the 3rd squadron was formed, and the name of the whole unit was changed into the Cavalry Regiment of the 4th Rifle Division.

In late January 1919, the regiment was shipped from Kuban to Odessa, where a number of volunteers joined it, and its name was again changed into Uhlan Regiment of the 1st Cavalry Division. At that time, the regiment had 98 officers and 530 soldiers, together with machine gunners and communications platoon. Elements of the regiment fought alongside French, Greek and White Russian forces, near Odessa and Tiraspol. When in April 1919 allied forces decided to leave southern Ukraine, the regiment covered the retreat, crossing the Dniester river as the last unit. After a two-month stay in Bessarabia, the regiment entered Poland on June 15, 1919, near Sniatyn.

== Fighting in 1919–1921 ==
In late June 1919, the regiment began fighting in the Polish–Ukrainian War. The uhlans clashed with the enemy in several locations of former Austrian Galicia. On July 11–13, 1919 near Yazlovets in Eastern Galicia, the regiment defeated Ukrainian forces, successfully defending the local convent of the Sisters of the Immaculate Conception of the Blessed Virgin Mary. After this battle, the Lady of Jazłowiec became the regiment's patron saint, and the regimental flag was devised by former students of the convent school.

After pushing Ukrainian forces behind the Zbruch river, the regiment marched to Volhynia, to fight the advancing Red Army. In August 1919, it was officially named the 14th Uhlan Regiment of Jazłowiec. It fought with distinction in the Polish–Soviet War, participating in the Kiev offensive and the Battle of Komarów. In recognition of their outstanding bravery, several of its officers and soldiers were awarded the Virtuti Militari and the Cross of Valour.

== Second Polish Republic ==
In 1921–1939, the regiment was garrisoned in the city of Lwów, in the barracks located on Lyczakowska Street. Its flag was awarded the Virtuti Militari 5th Class, in a ceremony on March 20, 1921. The ceremony was attended by Marshal Józef Piłsudski.

== 1939 Invasion of Poland ==
In the 1939 Invasion of Poland, the regiment belonged to Podolska Cavalry Brigade, as part of Łódź Army (later it was transferred to Poznań Army). Mobilized on August 27, it was transported by rail from Lwów to the town of Nekla, near Września. The regiment at first covered Polish positions some 10 kilometers west of Poznań, and on September 4, it was ordered to march eastwards, via Gniezno, Słupca and Konin, to Uniejów, where it arrived on September 9.

As part of Cavalry Operational Group of General Stanisław Grzmot-Skotnicki, the 14th Uhlan Regiment of Jazłowiec fought in the Battle of the Bzura, in the area of Łęczyca, Łowicz and Stryków. After the death of General Grzmot-Skotnicki, the group was commanded by General Roman Abraham, who ordered his soldiers to march westwards, into the Kampinos Forest. On September 17, near the village of Gorki, the uhlans fought a heavy battle with the advancing Wehrmacht. After the clash, the group at first marched towards Modlin, but soon General Abraham changed his order and decided to march towards the besieged Warsaw. On September 19, in the Battle of Wólka Węglowa, the Jazlowiec uhlans managed to defeat the enemy and enter Warsaw. This battle was witnessed and described by Italian war correspondent Mario Appelius.

While in Warsaw, the decimated regiment was merged with the 6th Kaniow Uhlan Regiment and fought until the capitulation on September 28.

Following the Polish defeat, the flag of the regiment was recognized for the outstanding bravery of its soldiers.

== Commandants of the Regiment ==
- Captain Szmidt (II – VIII 1918, while in Moldova),
- Rotmistrz Perkowski (VIII – IX 1918),
- Major Konstanty Plisowski (IX 1918 – VII 1920),
- Major Jerzy Bardzinski (since 18 VIII 1920),
- Rotmistrz Piotr Massalski (until 12 IX 1920, WIA),
- Captain Michal Belina-Prazmowski (27 VIII – 12 IX 1920),
- Major Albert Wielopolski (since 1 IV 1921),
- Colonel Konstanty Przezdziecki (since 8 II 1922),
- Colonel Marian Przewlocki (16 XII 1925 – 14 IV 1927),
- Colonel Antoni Szuszkiewicz (14 IV 1927 – 23 XII 1931),
- Colonel Andrzej Kunachowicz (23 III 1932–1936),
- Colonel Edward Józef Godlewski (since 4 II 1936),
- Rotmistrz Andrzej Heliodor Sozanski (since 26 IX 1939).

== Jazłowiec Uhlans in Western Europe ==
The Regiment was recreated in April 1940 in France, as the 3rd Battalion of Jazłowiec Uhlans. After the French defeat, the unit was once again recreated, this time in Great Britain, as the 1st Rifle Battalion of Jazłowiec Uhlans. Since October 1940, it belonged to the 10th Armoured Cavalry Brigade and was commanded by Colonel Witold Gierulewicz.

Until late 1941, the battalion remained stationed in the County of Angus, Scotland. In October 1941, it was renamed into 14th Armoured Cavalry Regiment. Transferred to France after the Invasion of Normandy, it was equipped with American M4 Sherman tanks, and since August 1944, the regiment began recruiting ethnic Poles, who had served in the Wehrmacht and had been captured as POWs.

By April 1945, the regiment, commanded by Colonel Stefan Starnawski, was trained, equipped and ready to fight.

The regiment was dissolved in 1947.

== Jazłowiec Uhlans in the Home Army ==
In the spring of 1944, the regiment was also formed by the Home Army of the Area of Lwów, to fight in Operation Tempest. It was commanded by Colonel Andrzej Choloniewski, whose deputy was Captain Dragan Sotirović, a former officer of the Royal Yugoslav Army, who escaped from a German POW camp, and found refuge among Polish partisans. The regiment defended Polish villages around Lwów from attacks carried out by the Ukrainian Insurgent Army. In July 1944, it had 827 soldiers and officers.

On July 22–27, 1944, Jazłowiec Uhlans fought in the Lwów uprising, after which many Polish soldiers were arrested by the NKVD and deported to Siberia. Those who escaped captivity continued fighting the Soviets until June 1945.

== Symbols ==
The flag, founded by students of the school of Sisters of the Immaculate Conception of the Blessed Virgin Mary in Jazlowiec, was handed to the regiment by Marshal Józef Piłsudski, on March 20, 1921, in Tomaszów Lubelski.

During the Invasion of Poland, the flag was taken to the battlefield. On September 19, during the Battle of Wolka Weglowa, the regimental flag-bearer was shot by the enemy and dropped the flag. The Germans managed to capture the symbol, but it was soon retaken by the Poles (this incident was accurately described by Mario Appelus). After the battle, the flag was taken to Warsaw, and after the city's capitulation, it was hidden in the house of the Narutowicz family, located on Nowogrodzka Street.

The badge of the regiment was accepted by military authorities on December 13, 1921. It is in the shape of the Maltese cross, with the Virtuti Militari located in the middle, the Podolian sun, letters U J, and the date, 1918.

The regiment had its own zurawiejka: "Hey girls, pull up your dresses, the Jazłowiec Uhlans is coming your way".

The traditions of the regiment are kept by the 1st Tank Battalion of 6th Armoured Cavalry Brigade, garrisoned in Stargard Szczeciński.

== See also ==
- Polish cavalry
- St Andrew Bobola Church, Hammersmith

== Bibliography ==
- Memories of the Regiment in the Inter-war years
- Henryk Smaczny: Księga kawalerii polskiej 1914–1947: rodowody, barwa, broń. Warszawa: TESCO, 1989
- Kazimierz Satora: Opowieści wrześniowych sztandarów. Warszawa: Instytut Wydawniczy Pax, 1990
