= Dragan Sotirović =

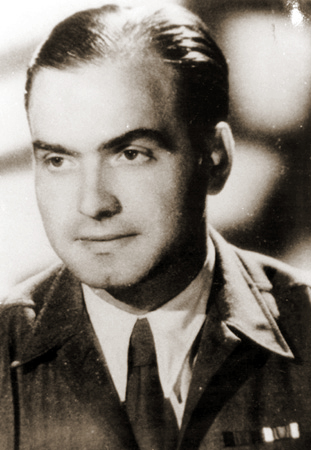
- Dragan Sotirović
- Born: 5 May 1913; Vranje, Kingdom of Serbia
- Died: 6 June 1987 (aged 74); Thessaloniki, Greece
- Military career
- Allegiance: Kingdom of Yugoslavia; Polish government-in-exile
- Branch: Chetniks; Home Army
- Rank: Major
- Conflicts: World War II
- Awards: Virtuti Militari

Dragan Mihajlo Sotirović (serb: Драган Михајло Сотировић: fr. Dragan Michel Sotirovitch, Draża, X, Michał; 5 May 1913 – 5 or 6 June 1987) was a Serb Chetnik, Captain of the Yugoslav Army, and Major of the Home Army’s 14th Regiment of Jazlowiec Uhlans. For his service and bravery, Sotirović was awarded the Virtuti Militari.

== Life ==
Sotirović entered the Yugoslav Army in 1934, and in 1940, he began studying at the Yugoslav Military Academy. Promoted to Captain, he fought in the 1941 Invasion of Yugoslavia, after which he joined guerilla forces of General Draža Mihailović, the Chetniks. Captured by the Wehrmacht, he was sent with other Yugoslav officers to POW Camp Nr. 325 in Rawa Ruska. After the transfer to a camp in Stryj, Sotirović simulated appendicitis and was taken to a hospital. He fled on 13 January 1944 and soon made contact with local Home Army unit, which took him to a hideout in the village of Zubrza near Lwow.

After identity check, Sotirović was in late March 1944 sent to the Home Army's 14th Regiment of Jazlowiec Uhlans, commanded by Colonel Andrzej Choloniewski. As his deputy, he participated in the pacification of a Ukrainian village Szolomyja, in which headquarters of a local branch of the Ukrainian Insurgent Army was located. According to some estimates, several dozen Ukrainian civilians were killed during the pacification. He also fought in the Lwow Uprising, attacking German positions east of the city. For his bravery, he was on 27 July 1944 awarded the Virtuti Militari by Colonel Wladyslaw Filipkowski.

On 31 July 1944 Sotirović was arrested by the NKVD. Together with other Home Army officers, he managed to escape behind the San river. On 5 March 1945 he was arrested again near Dynow. During an escape attempt he broke his foot, jumping off a balcony. Hiding his real identity and presenting himself as French officer Jacques Roman, who had been kept in a German POW camp at Odesa, Sotirović was taken to a hospital in Rzeszów, where he was freed by members of the NIE organization. In early April 1945, Sotirović joined anti-Communist forces near Rzeszów. His unit cooperated with local National Armed Forces unit and anti-Ukrainian peasant unit from the village of Grabowka.

After several clashes with the Ukrainians, Sotirović, who had been promoted to Major, convinced the warring sides to sign a local truce, on 29 May 1945 in Siedliska. Both sides recognized the Soviets as their common enemy, and ceased fighting each other.

The last raid of Sotirović's unit was a raid on a Soviet column, which took place on 25 June 1945 near Domaradz. He then moved to Lower Silesia, briefly serving as the president of the town of Leśna (Marklissa). Surrounded by a group of his former soldiers, Sotirović boarded his people on a train with ethnic Germans being moved to the west, and left Poland for US Occupation Zone in Germany (see Allied-occupied Germany). He then moved to France, taking on the name Jacques Roman. Sotirović settled in Monaco. He died on 5 or 6 June 1987, during a pilgrimage to Mount Athos in Greece.
