= Kuzman Sotirović =

Yugoslav footballer

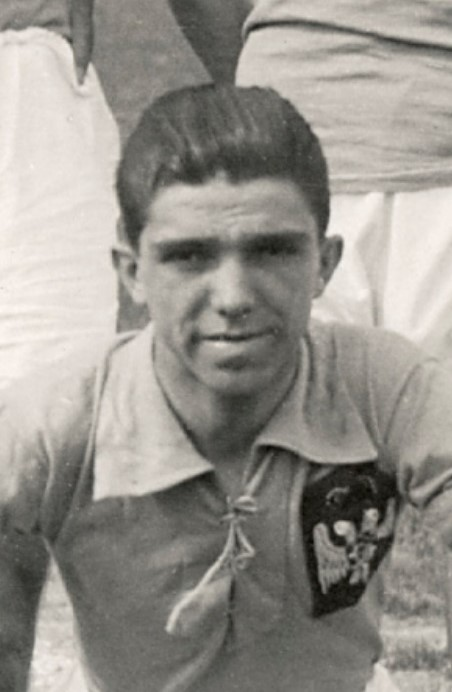
- Sotirović in 1928

Personal information
- Date of birth: 16 October 1908
- Place of birth: Stenče, Kosovo Vilayet, Ottoman Empire
- Date of death: 25 July 1990 (aged 81)
- Place of death: Paris, France
- Position: Forward

Senior career*
Years	Team	Apps	(Gls)
1927–1928	BSK Belgrade		
1928–1932	FC Sète		
1932	SC Montpellier		

International career
1928–1931	Yugoslavia	5	(2)
- * Club domestic league appearances and goals

Kuzman Sotirović (Macedonian: Kузман Сотировиќ, Serbian Cyrillic: Kузман Coтировић; 16 October 1908 – 25 July 1990) was a Yugoslav football forward. In some sources, he is referred to as Kuzman Sotirovski (Кузман Сотировски). He was part of Yugoslavia's team at the 1928 Summer Olympics.

== Club career ==
A player of short stature and medium build, Sotirović usually played as an attacking midfielder where he used his good technical abilities to keep the ball and create scoring chances up front. He first started playing in youth sections at BSK Belgrade, and, after becoming a standard first-team member, won the best championship scorer in 1928, scoring 6 goals in 5 appearances. The very next season he went to France and played for FC Sète and Montpellier SC.

== International career ==
Between 1928 and 1931 Sotirović also played for Yugoslavia national football team. He debuted on 6 May 1928 against Romania and his last game for the national team was on 4 October 1931 against Bulgaria at the Balkan Cup. He is considered to be the first player born on the territory of modern-day North Macedonia to play in the Yugoslavia national team.

== Personal life ==
After retirement from football during 1930s, he continued to live in Paris until his death in 1990. He was buried at the Belgrade New Cemetery as per his wish.

== Honours ==
- Yugoslav championship top scorer: 1927
