= Władysław Filipkowski =

Polish Officer

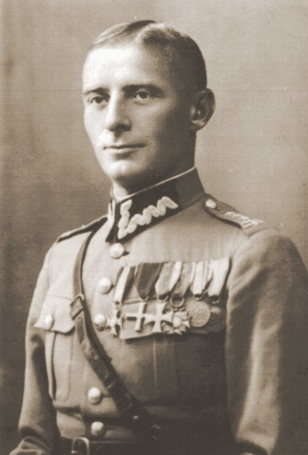
- Nicknames: Cis, Janka
- Born: 1 May 1892; Filipów near Suwałki, Congress Poland
- Died: 17 April 1950 (aged 57) Pieńsk near Zgorzelec, Wrocław Voivodeship, Recovered Territories
- Service years: 1914
- Rank: Generał brygady
- Conflicts: Lwów Uprising
- Awards: Virtuti Militari Polonia Restituta IV class Cross of the Valorous Golden Cross of Merit Cross of Independence Commander's Cross of Star of Romania with Stars
- Other work: factory clerk

Władysław Filipkowski (noms de guerre Cis and Janka; 1 May 1892 – 17 April 1950) was a Polish military commander and a professional officer of the Polish Army. During World War II he was the commanding officer of the Armia Krajowa units in the inspectorate of Lwów (modern Lviv) and the commander of the Lwów Uprising. For his merits he was promoted to the titular rank of generał brygady.

Władysław Jakub Filipkowski was born on 1 May 1892 in the village of Filipów near Suwałki, then in the Privislinsky Krai of the Russian Empire. In 1909 he graduated from a local gymnasium in Suwałki and then left for Galicia, the only part of partitioned Poland where teaching in Polish was permitted. There he started studying at the law faculty of the Lviv University. Simultaneously he also studied at the machine engineering faculty of the Lviv University of Technology, where he became a member of the Związek Strzelecki paramilitary organization. However, he did not finish his studies at the latter university due to the outbreak of the Great War.

On 1 August 1914 he joined the Polish Legions, where he held a number of posts. He fought in the Carpathians, Bukovina and Volhynia, serving as a commander of a single piece of artillery, of an infantry platoon and as an adjutant of a battalion of heavy howitzers. Following the Oath Crisis of 1917 he was interned by the Germans. Released from the prisoner camp on 1 November 1918, he moved to Warsaw, where he joined the newly born Polish Army immediately after its creation. Initially a clerk in the Inspectorate of Artillery, on November 29 he became an adjutant to the Polish commander-in-chief, General (later Marshal of Poland) Józef Piłsudski. During the early stage of the Polish-Bolshevik War, in November 1919 he was dispatched to Lwów, where he served as the commander of the local cell of the II Detachment of the Headquarters, that is the intelligence and counter-intelligence service. He held that post until the signing of the peace of Riga.

During the May Coup d'État in Poland Filipkowski with an infantry regiment under his command supported the revolters of Piłsudski against the government. He remained in the military until the outbreak of World War II. He fought in the Polish Defensive War as a commander of an improvised infantry unit. Captured by the Soviets on 2 October 1939, he was imprisoned in Lwów. However, he managed to escape from the prison and moved to German-held General Government. There he hid in Otwock and then in Warsaw, under a variety of false identities. He joined the SZP resistance organization, which was later reformed into the Association of Armed Resistance and in the end into the Home Army. As one of the high-ranking Polish officers who knew the city of Lwów - yet were not known to a wider public prior to the outbreak of World War II, Filipkowski was a perfect candidate for a chief of Polish resistance in that town. In early 1940 he returned there under a false name and started to organize the Polish resistance. Initially under Soviet occupation, he continued his work as a Home Army inspector for the area of the city after the German take-over of the area in 1941. On 1 August 1943 he was made the commander of all Home Army units in the region.

In 1944 the units under his command started the Operation Tempest in the area. Filipkowski commanded the Polish forces in the Lwów Uprising, in which the Home Army, with assistance of the advancing Red Army, took control over the city from the Germans. In the same period his wife, Janina née Obiedzińska and one of his two sons Jan (b. 1922) were active members of the Home Army in Masovia. The latter was killed in the final days of the Warsaw Uprising.

Soon after the German forces were pushed out of the city, Filipkowski was invited to a conference with Michał Rola-Żymierski and arrested by the Soviet NKVD in Zhytomir on 3 August 1944; at the same time most of his soldiers were also arrested and sent to Soviet prisons - or had to flee back to German-held part of Poland. Filipkowski was held in a number of Soviet prisons, including the prison in Kiev, a Smersh camp of the 1st Ukrainian Front, and NKVD camps in Kharkov, Ryazan, Dyagilev, Gryazovets and Brest. In November 1947 he was handed over to the Ministry of Public Security of Poland in Biała Podlaska, interrogated and set free. However, soon afterwards his younger son Andrzej (b. 1925), also a former soldier of the Home Army, was arrested by the Communists and was held in prisons until the destalinization thaw of 1956.

Władysław Filipkowski then was resettled to the town of Pieńsk (former German: Penzig) near Zgorzelec in the Recovered Territories of the newly restored Republic of Poland, where he found a job of an administrative director of a local state-owned glass works. He died there on 17 April 1950 and was buried in the Powązki cemetery of Warsaw.

== Honours and awards ==
- Silver Cross of Virtuti Militari (1922)
- Officer's Cross of the Order of Polonia Restituta (1936)
- Cross of Independence (1931)
- Cross of Valour - twice (1922)
- Gold Cross of Merit (1928)
- Commander's Cross with Star of the Order of the Crown of Romania (1939)
