= Lwów Uprising =

World War II battle

- Part of Operation Tempest in the Eastern Front of World War II
- Polish soldiers fighting in the University of Technology area, a lookout ledge
Date	23–27 July 1944
Location	Lviv
Result	Polish victory (Note: Polish and Soviet forces together capture Lwów, afterwards Polish forces imprisoned by the Soviets)

Belligerents
Armia Krajowa	Germany

Commanders and leaders
Władysław Filipkowski	Josef Harpe

The Lwów Uprising (Polish: powstanie lwowskie) was an armed insurrection by the Home Army (Polish: Armia Krajowa) underground forces of the Polish resistance movement in World War II against the Nazi German occupation of the city of Lviv in the latter stages of World War II. It began on 23 July 1944 as part of a secret plan to launch the countrywide all-national uprising codenamed Operation Tempest ahead of the Soviet advance on the Eastern Front. The Lwów uprising lasted until 27 July. Shortly afterwards, the Polish troops were disarmed, officers were arrested by the Soviet NKVD and ordinary soldiers either arrested or conscripted into the Soviet-created and controlled People’s Army of Poland (LWP) under Red Army command (and strict NKVD political control). Some were forced to join the Red Army, others sent to the Gulag camps. The city itself was occupied by the Soviet Union.

== Background ==
In late December 1943, the Red Army initiated yet another offensive upon the 1939 territory of Poland. Already on 4 January 1944, the first Soviet units crossed the pre-war Polish border in Volhynia. By the end of March, most of Tarnopol Voivodeship lay in their hands, with the Germans preparing to retreat behind the Bug River. Under such circumstances, the Home Army devised a plan of a gradual uprising that was to break out before the advancing Soviets, defeat the withdrawing German troops, and allow the underground Polish authorities to appear in newly liberated areas as their legitimate governors. The plan, code-named Operation Tempest, was put into action. By early July 1944, the local Lwów Home Army division of the Jazłowiec Uhlans (Ułani Jazłowieccy) prepared specific orders for all Polish partisan units in the area.

According to the order of 5 July 1944, the forces of the Home Army within the city were divided into five districts, each with its own centre of mobilization and different tasks. On 18 July the German civilian authorities and Nazi-organized Ukrainian Auxiliary Police withdrew from the city. The following day, the forces of the Wehrmacht left Lwów, leaving only a token force. This left large parts of the town practically in Polish hands. However, at the same time, several new divisions of the Wehrmacht appeared at the city's outskirts, causing the Polish headquarters to postpone the uprising. It was not until the afternoon of 21 July that the first reconnaissance units of the Red Army arrived at the area.

== The uprising ==
Soviet 29th Tank Brigade of the 4th Tank Army under Lt. Gen. Lelushenko reached the city's limits on 22 July 1944. At that moment, the Polish Home Army decided to commence the battle against German fortified outposts throughout Lwów.

The German forces relocated from the outskirts of the city's and fortified themselves in the city centre. In the early hours of the following day, what started as a series of skirmishes resulted in an outbreak of heavy urban warfare. The first to join the fight was the 14th Home Army Uhlan Regiment of foot, clearing the suburb of Łyczaków and pushing towards the old town along Zielona and Łyczakowska streets. In the western area, the Polish forces outnumbered the Germans and were able to capture the Main Train Station terminal. The southern area was almost abandoned by the Germans and the Polish forces were able to capture the 19th century citadel with large military supply depots. This success allowed the supply of the Polish troops with badly needed arms.

On 23 July the heaviest fighting ensued in the city centre and the northern district, where the Poles were able to capture only the Gas Works, preventing their demolition by the German troops. In the city centre, the partisans were aided by the entire Soviet 10th Tank Corps, which was gradually joining the fight. The Soviets advanced in three wedges. One of them aimed at the southern area, already cleared from any German resistance by the Polish units. The two others reinforced the Polish units attacking along the Zielona and Łyczakowska streets. By the end of the day, the last column reached the Old Town Square and the Poles captured the Old Town Market.

Afterwards, the civil and military authorities were summoned for a meeting with Red Army commanders and captured by the NKVD with guarantees of safety for all attendees provided. Despite these guarantees, the Soviets arrested some 5000 Polish soldiers who were sent to "Miedniki" gulag. The remaining forces of Col. Władysław Filipkowski were forcibly conscripted to the Red Army, sent to the Gulag or escaped to rejoin the underground.
