= Stenče =

Stenče Стенче
- Village
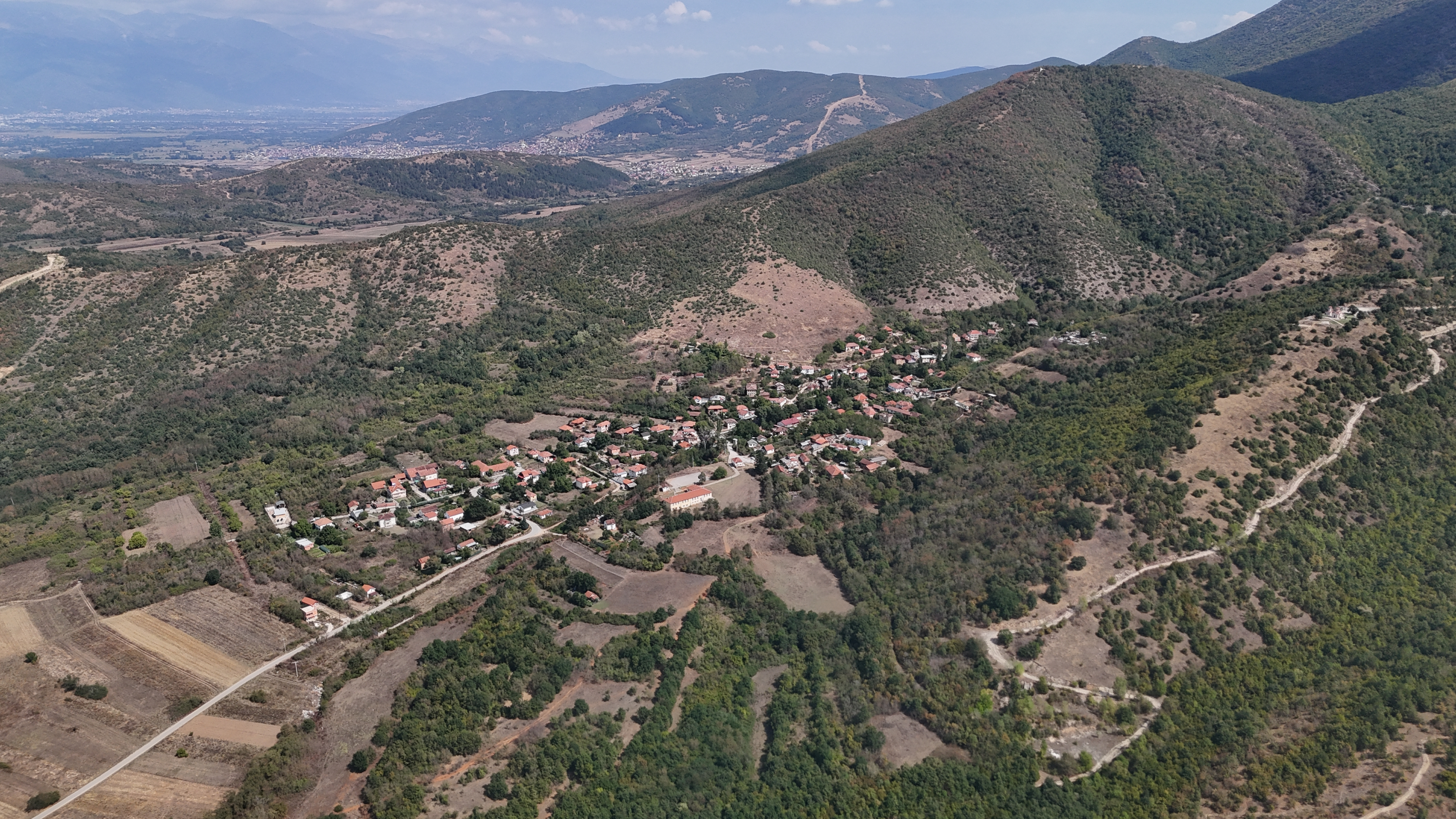
- Air view of the village

- Location within North Macedonia
- Coordinates: 41.876032°N 21.001847°E
- Country: North Macedonia
- Region: Polog
- Municipality: Brvenica

Population (2002)
  - Total: 150
- Time zone: UTC+1 (CET)
  - Summer (DST): UTC+2 (CEST)
- Website: .

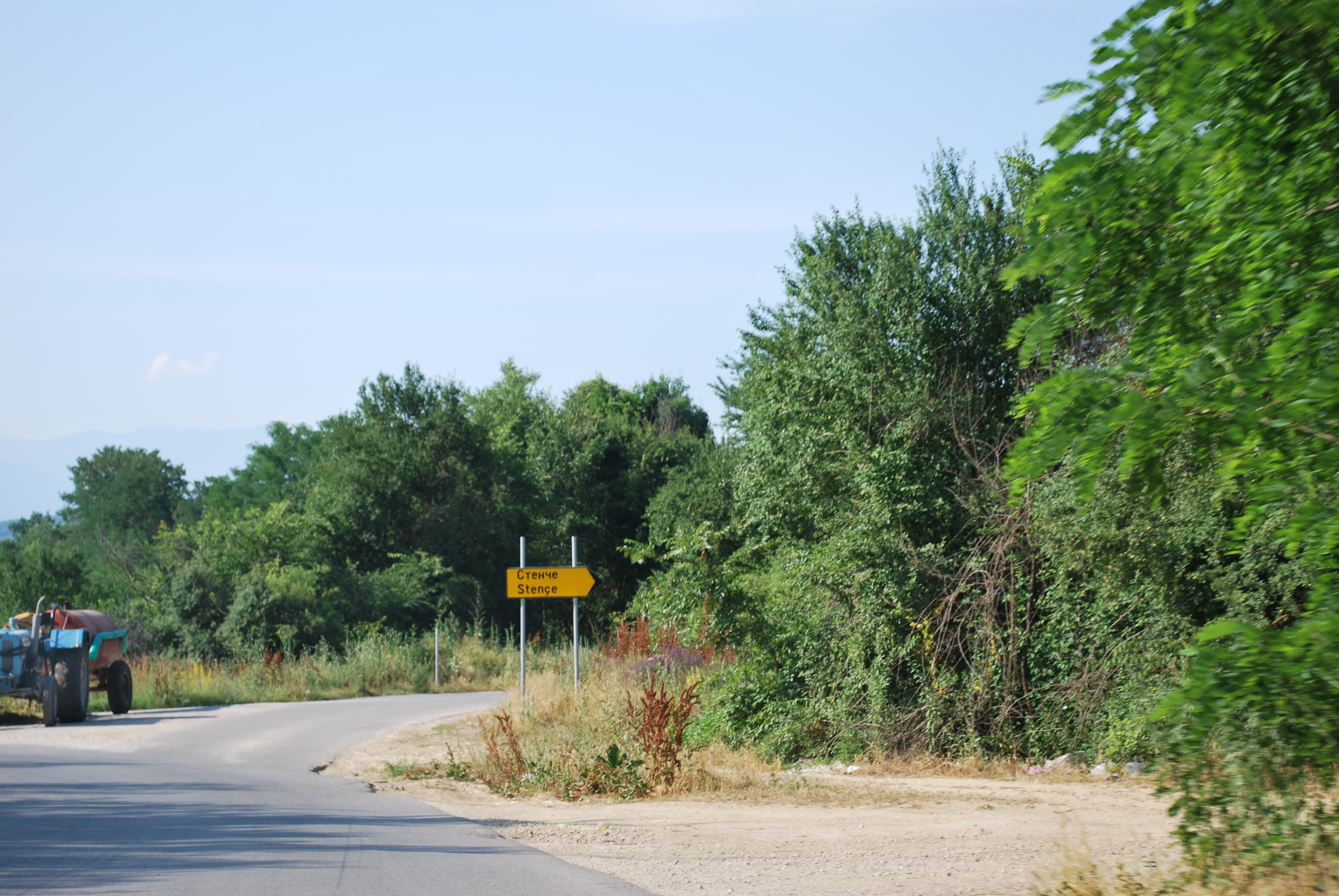
Turning for the village Stenče

Stenče (Macedonian: Стенче) is a village in the municipality of Brvenica, North Macedonia.

== History ==
Stenče is attested in the 1467/68 Ottoman tax registry (defter) for the Nahiyah of Kalkandelen. The village had a total of 52 Christian households, 2 bachelors and 1 widow.

According to the 1467-68 Ottoman defter, Stenče exhibits mostly Orthodox Christian Slavic and minority Albanian anthroponomy.

== Demographics ==
According to the 2002 census, the village had a total of 150 inhabitants. Ethnic groups in the village include:

- Macedonians 149
- Serbs 1

According to the 1942 Albanian census, Stenče was inhabited by 842 Bulgarians and 2 Muslim Albanians.

In statistics gathered by Vasil Kanchov in 1900, the village of Stenče was inhabited by 680 Christian Bulgarians.
