= Podolska Cavalry Brigade =

Former Polish Army cavalry unit

Podolska Cavalry Brigade (Polish: Podolska Brygada Kawalerii) was a cavalry unit of the Polish Army in the interbellum period. It was created on April 1, 1937 out of the 6th Independent Cavalry Brigade. It took its name from Podolia (Polish: Podole) region. Its headquarters were stationed in Stanisławów and the brigade consisted of these units:

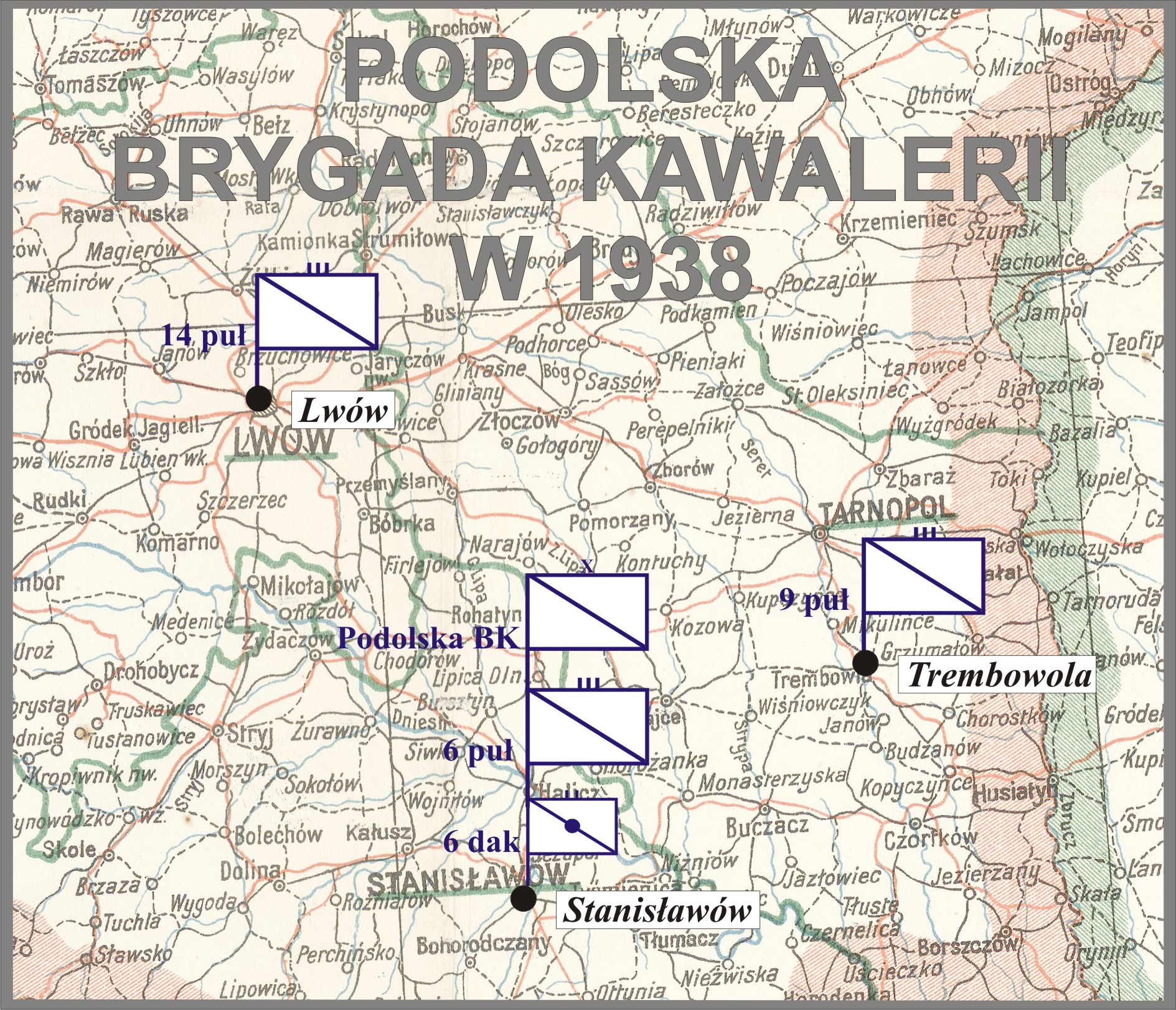
Podolska BK w 1938

- 6th Kaniow Uhlan Regiment, stationed in Stanisławów,
- 9th Lesser Poland Uhlan Regiment, stationed in Trembowla
- 14th Jazlowiec Uhlan Regiment, stationed in Lwów,
- 6th General Soltyk's Mounted Artillery Regiment, stationed in Stanisławów,
- 6th Pioneers Squadron, stationed in Stanisławów,
- 6th Communications Squadron, stationed in Stanisławów.

== Polish September Campaign ==
Originally, the Brigade, under Colonel Leon Strzelecki, was part of Łódź Army, but after a change of Plan West, it was transferred to the Poznań Army. On September 1, 1939, it unloaded from trains in the operational area of the Army, but during the first week of the war, it was not engaged in combat. On September 8, it covered right wing of the Polish forces, during the Battle of the Bzura. Together with Polish 25th Infantry Division, it created offensive force of the Poznań Army, fighting German 221 I.D. of General Johann Pflugbeil.

After Polish defeat, remnants of the Brigade managed to break into the Kampinos Forest, from where, together with units of Wielkopolska Cavalry Brigade and Pomeranian Cavalry Brigade, they fought their way into besieged Warsaw.

== See also ==
- Polish army order of battle in 1939
- Polish contribution to World War II
- Wielkopolska Cavalry Brigade
