= Mario Appelius =

- Born: 29 July 1892; Arezzo, Kingdom of Italy
- Died: 27 December 1946 (aged 54); Rome, Italy
- Occupations: Writer, journalist, radio broadcaster

Mario Appelius (Arezzo, 29 July 1892 – Rome, 27 December 1946) was an Italian journalist and radio presenter, best known for being one of the most prominent Fascist propagandists during World War II. He was famous for his catchphrase, Dio stramaledica gli inglesi! ("May God curse the English!").

== Biography ==
Since he was a child, Appelius showed a keen interest in travel and adventure, repeatedly running away from home until at age fifteen his father forced him to embark as a ship's boy on a merchant ship as a punishment. He then deserted his job in the merchant navy and began wandering between Egypt, India, Indochina, the Philippines and China, working odd jobs (such as waiter, clerk and travelling salesman) and starting businesses with varying fortunes. By age twenty he had visited three continents.

During a stay in Italy, he was offered the opportunity to collaborate with Il Popolo d'Italia, which offered him a correspondence from Africa while he was following an explorative expedition in which he had been hired as an interpreter. He thus started his writing career, publishing describing the cities, peoples and countries that he visited across the five continents during the 1920s and 1930s. In 1930 he founded the Italian language newspaper Il Mattino d'Italia in Buenos Aires, which he directed until 1933. He was later a war correspondent for Il Popolo d'Italia in Ethiopia and Spain.

A convinced Fascist, in 1938 he was among the public supporters of the Manifesto of Race which preceded the promulgation of the Fascist racial laws. During the Second World War he was a radio commentator, becoming famous for his catchphrase "God damn the English!" and talk about the "demo-pluto-masso-judaic conspiracy". After the German invasion of Poland, he claimed that the German successes were due to the application of the tactics already employed by the Italians in Catalonia, during the Spanish Civil War.

During the course of the war he aligned himself completely with Axis propaganda, sometimes inventing victorious battles for the Third Reich out of thin air, as in the case of a fictional battle between the Luftwaffe and the Royal Navy off the Skagerrak which he reported in April 1940. Despite the popularity of his radio broadcasts, his refusal to deny the difficulties encountered by the Italian-German armed forces and his increasingly pessimistic tones eventually made him disliked by the Ministry of Popular Culture and by Mussolini himself, resulting in his dismissal on 20 February 1943. He did not join the Italian Social Republic after the armistice of Cassibile, and in November 1944 he was arrested by the pro-Allied Italian government and tried for apology of fascism, being sentenced to a prison term which he avoided owing to the Togliatti amnesty. He died in Rome a few months later, from meningoencephalitis.
