= 9th Lesser Poland Uhlan Regiment =

Calvalry regiment of the Polish Army

The 9th Lesser Poland Uhlan Regiment (Polish language: 9 Pulk Ulanow Malopolskich) was a cavalry regiment of the Polish Army, formed on November 21, 1918. Its first commandant was Rittmeister (Rotmistrz) Józef Dunin-Borkowski. The regiment fought in the Polish–Ukrainian War, Polish–Soviet War and the Invasion of Poland. In the Second Polish Republic, it was garrisoned in the towns of Czortków and Trembowla, and in 1939, it was part of Podolska Cavalry Brigade. The 9th Regiment was named after historic Polish province of Lesser Poland.

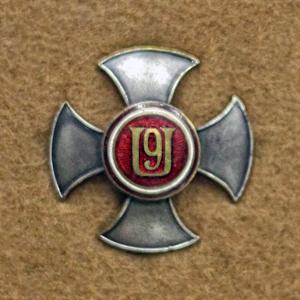

== Polish-Ukrainian War ==
In November 1918, Mounted Rifles Regiment was formed in Dębica by Rittmeister Józef Dunin-Borkowski, who based the unit upon German model. On November 21, its 1st Squadron was sent to the Ukrainian front, where it protected the rail line from Lwów to Przemyśl, and in late December participated in the liberation of Lwów. In December 1918, with volunteers from Lwów, an infantry company was formed, and incorporated into the regiment. In February 1919, 3rd Squadron was sent to the area of Cieszyn to aid Polish troops fighting the Czechoslovaks. By May 1919, all four squadrons were in Eastern Galicia, and in June 1919, the regiment was officially named 9th Uhlan Regiment.

After Polish 4th Infantry Division had broken through Ukrainian lines near Krysowice, Polish forces advanced eastwards. On May 19, 1919, the 9th Regiment captured Drohobycz, on May 24, Kałusz, and three days later Stanisławów, together with several trains stocked with food and weapons. The regiment then advanced towards Halicz and Podhajce. South of Buczacz, a bloody skirmish with the Ukrainians took place. Polish advance was halted. The regiment rested for a while, and in early July 1919 continued its offensive, capturing Skalat and reaching the Zbrucz river near Podwołoczyska, where it faced the Red Army, advancing westwards.

== Polish-Soviet War ==
After the Ukrainian war, the regiment was transported to Volhynia, where Soviet troops concentrated near Równe. On August 12, 1919, the regiment captured Zdołbunów, and remained there until October, when it was engaged by Soviet forces north of Sarny. In February 1920, after several skirmishes with the enemy, the regiment was sent to Równe for rest and training, which lasted two months. During this time, the regiment was strengthened by a squadron of machine guns.

On April 24, 1920, 4th Cavalry Division, with 9th regiment began an offensive towards Koziatyn. After the victorious Battle of Koziatyn, Polish uhlans captured 24 cannons, 176 machine guns, one armoured vehicle, 3 planes, 120 locomotives and 300 rail cars with cargo. Soviet forces retreated eastwards, and Poles captured Żytomierz, Berdyczów, Biała Cerkiew and finally Kiev.

== September 1939 ==
In the first days of the Invasion of Poland, the regiment patrolled rear areas of Podolska Cavalry Brigade. Since September 10, it was engaged in heavy fighting against the Wehrmacht in central Poland, the area of Uniejów. Surrounded by the Germans, elements of the regiment managed to break through enemy lines and reach Warsaw, where it capitulated together with the Polish capital. After the September Campaign, the flag of the regiment was awarded the Virtuti Militari. Also, a number of its soldiers were awarded either the Virtuti Militari or the Cross of Valor.

== Polish Forces in the West ==
After the defeat of Poland, in the autumn of 1939, Major Hugo Kornberger decided to form a Polish cavalry regiment in France. The unit was based on a reserve squadron of the 9th Lesser Poland Uhlans, which had been based in Stanisławów, and which was safely evacuated to Romania, and then to France.

General Władysław Sikorski accepted Kornberger’s idea, and Recon Unit of 3rd Infantry Division took over traditions of the 9th Lesser Poland Uhlans. The unit was formed in Brittany, in the town of Loyat. After the Invasion of France, the regiment was evacuated to Great Britain, and was stationed in Scotland. On January 8, 1944, 2nd Recon Unit of the Motorized Infantry Division was officially named the 9th Lesser Poland Uhlans Regiment. In January 1945, the regiment was transferred to the 4th Infantry Division, receiving Humber Armoured Cars, T17s, Universal Carriers, Loyd Carriers and other equipment.

== Commandants of the Regiment ==
- Rittmeister Józef Dunin-Borkowski (1918-1919)
- Major Zygmunt Bartmański (KIA 19 V 1919 near Drohobycz)
- Major Józef Dunin-Borkowski (1919-1920)
- Major Stefan Jacek Dembiński (VII 1920 – X 1921)
- Colonel Stanisław Pomiankowski (1921-1927)
- Colonel Jan Janusz Pryziński (1927)
- Colonel Tadeusz Komorowski (1927-1938)
- Colonel Klemens Stanisław Rudnicki (1938-1939)
- Rittmeister Hugo Kornberger (1940)
- Major Włodzimierz Łączyński (1940)
- Rittmeister Hugo Kornberger (1940)
- Colonel Eugeniusz Święcicki (1940-1941)
- Major Kazimierz Buterlewicz (1941-1942)
- Colonel Emil Słatyński (1942-1946)
- Colonel Stefan Tomaszewski (1946-1947)

== Symbols of the regiment ==
The flag of the 9th Regiment of Lesser Poland Uhlans was founded in May 1920 by the residents of Drohobycz. On September 29, 1939, the flag was handed over to the vicar of St. Anthony church in Warsaw. The church was burned to the ground during the Warsaw Uprising, and only the top of the post was saved, and is now kept at the Polish Army Museum in Warsaw. In 1944, the residents of Glasgow funded another flag.

The day of the 9th Regiment of Lesser Poland Uhlans took place on August 31, the anniversary of the Battle of Komarów.

== Sources ==
- "Księga jazdy polskiej": pod protektoratem marsz. Edwarda Śmigłego–Rydza. Warszawa 1936.
- Roman Abraham: Wspomnienia wojenne znad Warty i Bzury. Warszawa: Wydawnictwo Ministerstwa Obrony Narodowej, 1990
- Henryk Smaczny: Księga kawalerii polskiej 1914-1947: rodowody, barwa, broń. Warszawa: TESCO, 1989
