= Hostage shootings in Serbia =

Hostage shootings in Serbia was a policy introduced by the German occupiers of Serbia during World War II in reprisal for Yugoslav Partisan activity. A large number of ethnic Serbs, Romani people, and Serbian Jews (see The Holocaust in German-occupied Serbia) were shot in executions such as the Kraljevo massacre and Kragujevac massacre. These shootings were punished as war crimes during the Hostages trial.
