= Emanuel Schäfer =

German SS officer and convicted war criminal (1900–1974)

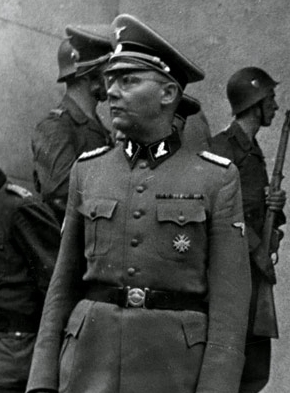
- Schäfer in 1943
- Born: 20 April 1900; Hultschin, Province of Silesia, Kingdom of Prussia, German Empire
- Died: 4 December 1974 (aged 74); Cologne, West Germany
- Status: Deceased
- Convictions: Spruchkammer, Bielefeld (1951); Membership of the Gestapo and SD; Landgericht Köln (1953); Accessory to murder; accessory to manslaughter (two counts); Landgericht Köln (1954); Deportation of Jews from Cologne
- Penalty: Spruchkammer, Bielefeld; 1 year 9 months Landgericht Köln (1953); 6 years 6 months Landgericht Köln (1954); 6 years 9 months (time on remand credited)
- SS service
- Allegiance: Nazi Germany
- Branch: Schutzstaffel
- Service years: 1936–1945
- Rank: SS-Oberführer and Oberst of Police
- Commands: Einsatzgruppe II (September–November 1939); Commander of SiPo and SD, Serbia (January 1942 – October 1944); BdS, Operational Zone of the Adriatic Littoral (early 1945 – May 1945)

Emanuel Paul Viktor Schäfer (20 April 1900 – 4 December 1974) was a German war criminal and SS officer, convicted after the war of complicity in the murder and manslaughter of Jews in German-occupied Serbia and of involvement in the deportation of Jews from Cologne. A protégé of Reinhard Heydrich, he commanded Einsatzgruppe II during the invasion of Poland in 1939, and from January 1942 headed the security police (SiPo) and SD in Serbia, where he directed the murder of thousands of Jews held at the Sajmište concentration camp in a mobile gas van. He served a total of some five years' imprisonment before his release in 1956.

== Early life ==
Schäfer was born in Hultschin (today, Hlučín) in Prussian Silesia, the son of a hotel owner. He attended local schools and enlisted in the Imperial German Army in June 1918 during the First World War, but was never deployed to the front. After the war, Schäfer joined the Upper Silesian Border Guard in early 1919 to repel the first Silesian uprising. He was a member of far-right militant groups such as the Marinebrigade Ehrhardt, a component of the Freikorps. Schäfer enrolled as a law student at the University of Breslau (today, the University of Wrocław) for the winter semester of 1920–1921. As part of a student volunteer company, he participated in the Battle of Annaberg during the third Silesian uprising. After resuming his interrupted studies, he received his Doctor of Law degree on 1 August 1925. From 1925 to the spring of 1928, he was a member of Der Stahlhelm, the paramilitary organization of German war veterans.

In April 1926, Schäfer joined the police force as a detective inspector candidate and completed his training at the police institute in Berlin-Charlottenburg. After passing his final state law examination in early 1928, he was hired by the Breslau police headquarters on 1 March 1928, and appointed a permanent detective inspector on 11 August 1928. At the end of 1928, he became head of the homicide squad and remained in this position until his appointment as head of the city's political police on 26 February 1933. He was promoted to criminal inspector on 1 September 1933.

At the beginning of 1933, Schäfer joined the Nazi Party's paramilitary unit, the Sturmabteilung (SA), and was appointed an SA-Truppführer on 20 April 1933. He was subsequently promoted to head of the Gestapo in Opeln (today, Opole) in May 1934, was commissioned an SA-Sturmführer in 1935, and became a Regierungs- und Kriminalrat (government and criminal law councilor) on 1 October 1936.

== Peacetime career in the SS ==
In 1933, Schäfer became a member of the Sicherheitsdienst (SD), the SS security and intelligence service headed by Reinhard Heydrich, and he entered the Schutzstaffel (SS number 280,018) as an SS-Untersturmführer in September 1936. He was promoted to SS-Obersturmführer on 20 April 1937, to SS-Hauptsturmführer on 1 August 1938, to SS-Sturmbannführer on 9 November 1938, and to SS-Obersturmbannführer on 10 September 1939. Schäfer did not formally become a member of the Nazi Party until August 1937 (membership number 4,659,879), on an application that was pending since May 1933 due to the national recruitment freeze imposed on new memberships.

== The Second World War and Holocaust involvement ==
As head of the Oppeln Gestapo, Schäfer was involved in the false flag attack on the Gleiwitz transmitter, which served as a pretext for the German attack on Poland that precipitated the Second World War in Europe. Schäfer was designated as the commander of Einsatzgruppe II, one of five such groups initially set up by Heydrich to combat all elements perceived as hostile in the army rear areas and to destroy the Polish intelligentsia. Composed of 4 Einsatzkommando sub-units of 100 to 150 men, Schäfer's task force followed in the wake of the 10th Army commanded by General Walter von Reichenau. Armed with previously prepared lists, the units rounded up Polish officials, teachers, doctors, priests, landowners, businessmen and Jews. They were gathered into camps where executions without trial were carried out.

Following the conclusion of the Polish campaign, Schäfer was appointed head of the newly established Gestapo office in Katowitz (today, Katowice) in November 1939. Shortly after his promotion to Oberregierungs- und Kriminalrat (senior government and criminal law councilor) on 1 September 1940, he was transferred to the leadership of the Gestapo office in Cologne in October 1940. During his tenure in that city, he dispatched 3 transports of Jews to concentration camps in the east between October and December 1941.

On 6 January 1942, Schäfer succeeded Wilhelm Fuchs as the Befehlshaber der Sicherheitspolizei und des SD or BdS (Commander of the Security Police and the SD) in Serbia and promoted to SS-Standartenführer at the end of the same month. Between March and May 1942, Schäfer utilized a Saurer gas van to murder around 7,300 Jews, predominantly women and children, from the Semlin camp across the Sava river from Belgrade. The van made one or two trips daily except for Sundays and holidays. The van was used for the last time on 10 May 1942 when the camp's Jewish prisoner functionaries were murdered. A further 1,200 Jews died as a result of the camp's harsh conditions, or from executions. It has been estimated that only 1,115 members of the Belgrade Jewish community, amounting to approximately 16% of its prewar count of 11,870, survived the war. In May 1942, Schäfer sent a cable to his superiors in the Reich Security Main Office boasting "with pride" that "Belgrade was the only great city in Europe that was free of Jews".

On 21 June 1943, Schäfer attained his final promotion to SS-Oberführer and Oberst of police. The Red Army and Yugoslav partisans launched the Belgrade offensive and drove the Germans out of city by late October 1944. After leaving Serbia, Schäfer served briefly as the commander of Einsatzgruppe K with the 5th Panzer Army during the Battle of the Bulge from December 1944 to January 1945. He then was appointed as the BdS in the Operational Zone of the Adriatic Littoral, with headquarters in Trieste, from early 1945 until the surrender of German forces in Italy on 29 May.

== Postwar life ==
Schäfer was held by American forces after the war, and lived for a time under the assumed name of Ernst Schleiffer. He was subsequently arrested by West German authorities. On 20 June 1951, the Spruchkammer (civilian denazification tribunal) at Bielefeld sentenced him to one year and nine months' imprisonment, minus the time spent on remand, for his membership of the Gestapo and SD; the sentence was completed in January 1953. He was tried again and, contrary to the original indictment, convicted of one count of accessory to murder and two counts of accessory to manslaughter arising from his command of the Sicherheitspolizei und SD in Serbia; on 20 June 1953, the Landgericht (regional court) in Cologne sentenced him to six years and six months' imprisonment. In July 1954, Schäfer was convicted, together with Franz Sprinz and Kurt Maschke, of involvement in the deportation of Jews from Cologne. He received a further sentence of six years and nine months, with time already spent in custody credited; Sprinz and Maschke were sentenced to three years and two years, respectively. Schäfer was released early in 1956 and subsequently worked in commercial advertising in Düsseldorf. He died in Cologne in December 1974.

== See also ==
- The Holocaust in German-occupied Serbia

== Sources ==
- Browning, Christopher R. (2004). The Origins of the Final Solution: The Evolution of Nazi Jewish Policy, September 1939–March 1932. University of Nebraska Press. ISBN 978-0-803-21327-2.
- Höhne, Heinz (1971). The Order of the Death's Head: The Story of Hitler's SS. New York: Ballantine Books. ISBN 0-345-28333-3.
- Klee, Ernst (2007). Das Personenlexikon zum Dritten Reich. Wer war was vor und nach 1945. Frankfurt-am-Main: Fischer-Taschenbuch-Verlag. ISBN 978-3-596-16048-8.
