= Einsatzgruppen =

Nazi paramilitary death squads, part of the SS

- The Einsatzgruppen operated under the administration of the Schutzstaffel (SS)

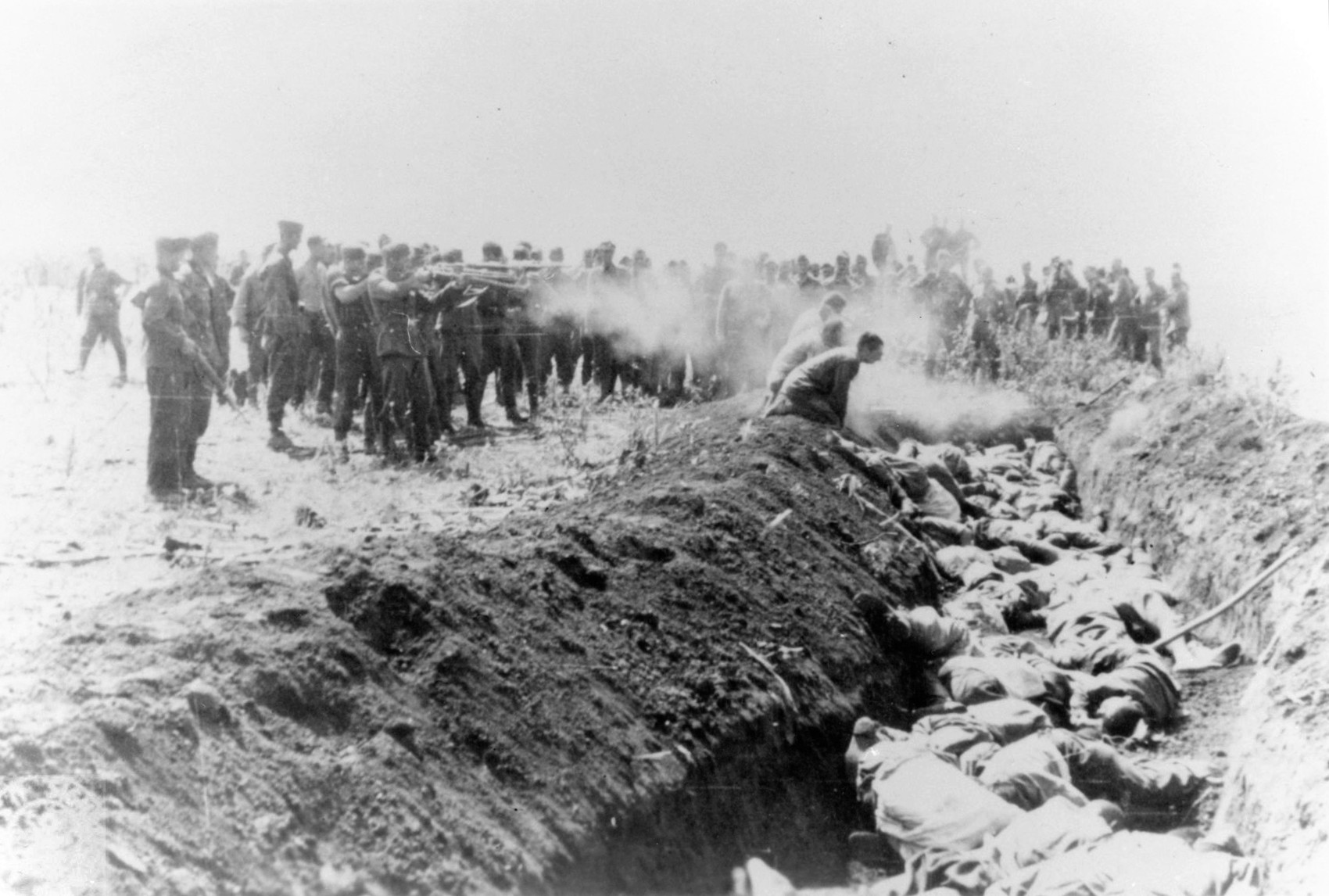
- Mass execution of Soviet civilians, 1941

Agency overview
- Formed: c. 1939
- Preceding agency: Einsatzkommando
- Jurisdiction: Germany and German-occupied Europe
- Headquarters: RSHA, Prinz-Albrecht-Straße, Berlin; 52°30′26″N 13°22′57″E
- Employees: c. 3,000 (1941)
- Minister responsible: Heinrich Himmler, Reichsführer-SS
- Agency executives: SS-Obergruppenführer Reinhard Heydrich, Director (1939–1942); SS-Obergruppenführer Ernst Kaltenbrunner, Director (1943–1945)
- Parent agency: Allgemeine SS and RSHA

Einsatzgruppen (Note: Singular: Einsatzgruppe; Official full name: Einsatzgruppen der Sicherheitspolizei und des SD.) (German: [ˈaɪnzatsˌɡʁʊpm̩], lit. 'deployment groups'; also 'task forces') were Schutzstaffel (SS) paramilitary death squads of Nazi Germany that were responsible for mass murder, primarily by shooting, during World War II (1939–1945) in German-occupied Europe. The Einsatzgruppen had an integral role in the implementation of the so-called "Final Solution to the Jewish question" (Die Endlösung der Judenfrage) in territories conquered by Nazi Germany, and were involved in the murder of much of the intelligentsia and cultural elite of Poland, including members of the Catholic priesthood. Almost all of the people they murdered were civilians, beginning with the intelligentsia and swiftly progressing to Soviet political commissars, Jews, and Romani people, as well as actual or alleged partisans throughout Eastern Europe.

Under the direction of Reichsführer-SS Heinrich Himmler and the supervision of SS-Obergruppenführer Reinhard Heydrich, the Einsatzgruppen operated in territories occupied by the Wehrmacht (German armed forces) following the invasion of Poland in September 1939 and the invasion of the Soviet Union in June 1941. The Einsatzgruppen worked hand-in-hand with the Order Police battalions on the Eastern Front to carry out operations ranging from the murder of a few people to operations which lasted over two or more days, such as the massacre at Babi Yar (with 33,771 Jews murdered in two days), and the Rumbula massacre (with about 25,000 Jews murdered in two days of shooting). As ordered by Nazi leader Adolf Hitler, the Wehrmacht cooperated with the Einsatzgruppen, providing logistical support for their operations, and participated in the mass murders. Historian Raul Hilberg estimates that between 1941 and 1945 the Einsatzgruppen, related agencies, and foreign auxiliary personnel murdered more than two million people, including 1.3 million of the 5.5 to 6 million Jews murdered during the Holocaust.

After the close of World War II, 24 officers, including multiple commanding officers, of the Einsatzgruppen were prosecuted in the Einsatzgruppen trial in 1947–48, charged with crimes against humanity and war crimes. Fourteen death sentences and two life sentences were delivered, but only four of the death sentences were carried out. Four additional Einsatzgruppe leaders were later tried and executed by other nations.

== Formation and Aktion T4 ==
The Einsatzgruppen were formed under the direction of SS-Obergruppenführer Reinhard Heydrich and operated by the Schutzstaffel (SS) before and during World War II. The Einsatzgruppen had their origins in the ad hoc Einsatzkommando formed by Heydrich to secure government buildings and documents following the Anschluss in Austria in March 1938. Originally part of the Sicherheitspolizei (Security Police; SiPo), two units of Einsatzgruppen were stationed in the Sudetenland in October 1938. When military action turned out not to be necessary due to the Munich Agreement, the Einsatzgruppen were assigned to confiscate government papers and police documents. They also secured government buildings, questioned senior civil servants, and arrested as many as 10,000 Czech communists and German citizens. From September 1939, the Reichssicherheitshauptamt (Reich Security Main Office; RSHA) had overall command of the Einsatzgruppen.

As part of the drive by the Nazi regime to remove so-called "undesirable" elements from the German population, from September to December 1939 the Einsatzgruppen and others took part in Aktion T4, a program of systematic murder of persons with physical and mental disabilities and patients of psychiatric hospitals. Aktion T4 mainly took place from 1939 to 1941, but the murders continued until the end of the war. Initially the victims were shot by the Einsatzgruppen and others, but gas chambers were put into use by spring 1940.

== Invasion of Poland ==
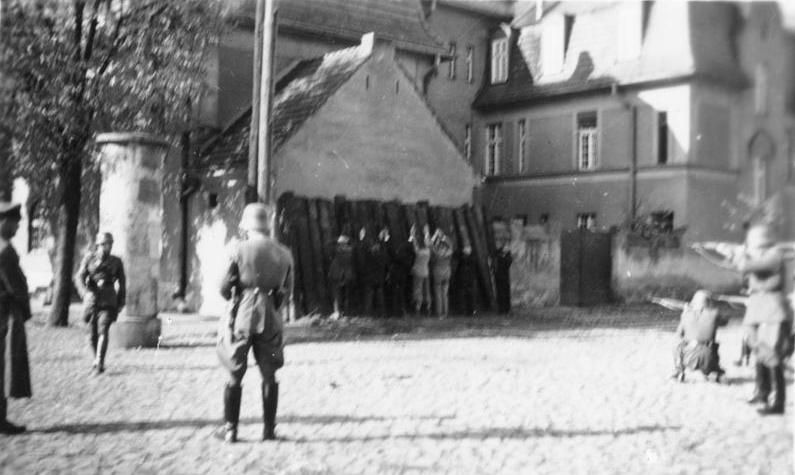
Execution of Poles in Kórnik, 20 October 1939

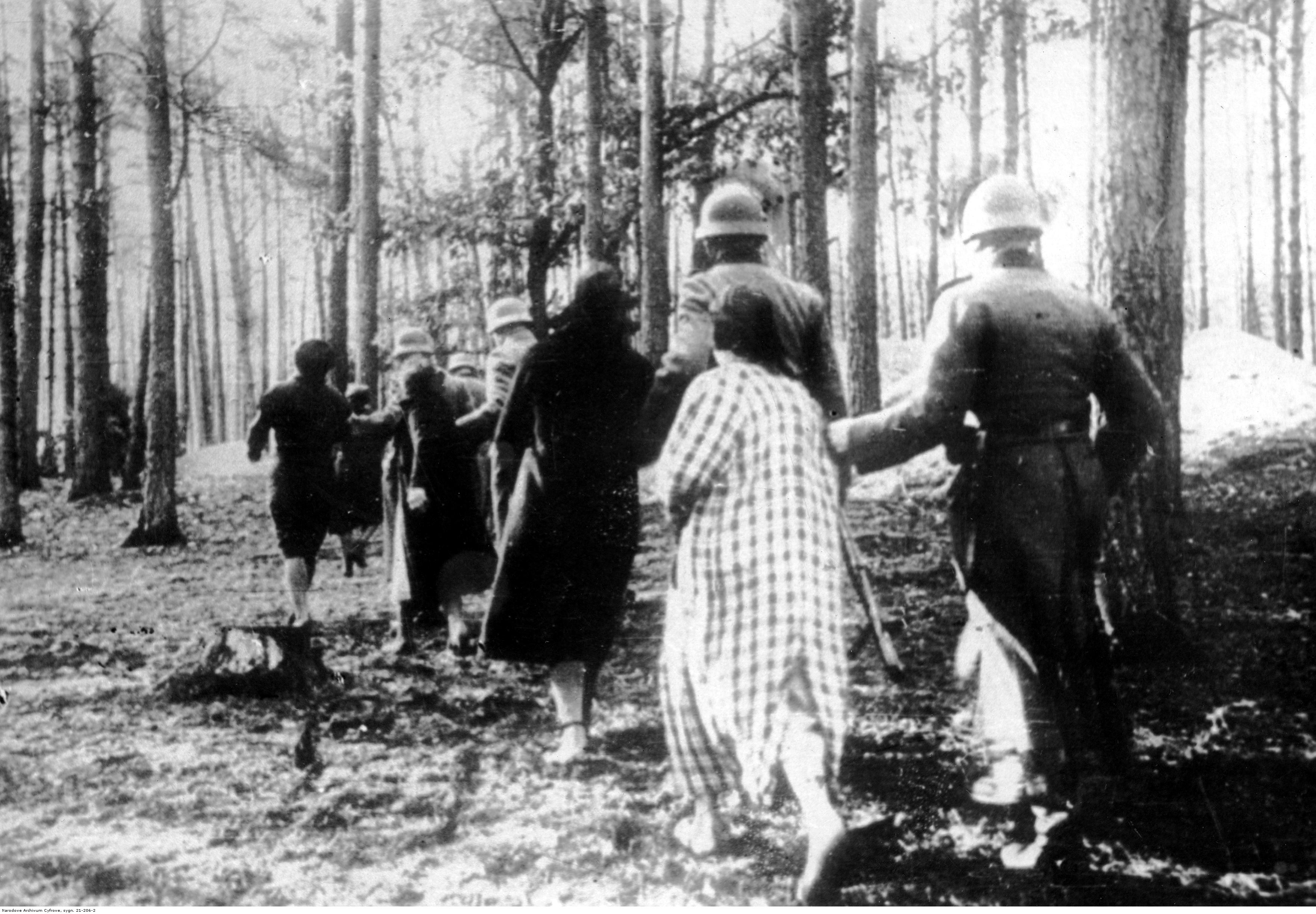
Polish women led to mass execution in a forest near Palmiry

In response to Adolf Hitler's plan to invade Poland on 1 September 1939, Heydrich re-formed the Einsatzgruppen to travel in the wake of the German armies. Membership at this point was drawn from the SS, the Sicherheitsdienst (Security Service; SD), the police, and the Gestapo. Heydrich placed SS-Obergruppenführer Werner Best in command, who assigned Hans-Joachim Tesmer to choose personnel for the task forces and their subgroups, called Einsatzkommandos, from among educated people with military experience and a strong ideological commitment to Nazism. Some had previously been members of paramilitary groups such as the Freikorps. Heydrich instructed the First Quartermaster of the Wehrmacht Heer Eduard Wagner in meetings in late July that the Einsatzgruppen should undertake their operations in cooperation with the Ordnungspolizei (Order Police; Orpo) and military commanders in the area. Army intelligence was in constant contact with Einsatzgruppen to coordinate their activities with other units.

Initially numbering 2,700 men (and ultimately 4,250 in Poland), the Einsatzgruppen's mission was to murder members of the Polish leadership most clearly identified with Polish national identity: the intelligentsia, members of the clergy, teachers, and members of the nobility. As stated by Hitler: "... there must be no Polish leaders; where Polish leaders exist they must be killed, however harsh that sounds". SS-Brigadeführer Lothar Beutel, commander of Einsatzgruppe IV, later testified that Heydrich gave the order for these murders at a series of meetings in mid-August. The Sonderfahndungsbuch Polen – lists of people to be murdered – had been drawn up by the SS as early as May 1939, using dossiers collected by the SD from 1936 forward. The Einsatzgruppen performed these murders with the support of the Volksdeutscher Selbstschutz, a paramilitary group consisting of ethnic Germans living in Poland during Operation Tannenberg. Members of the SS, the Wehrmacht, and the Ordnungspolizei also shot civilians during the Polish campaign. Approximately 65,000 civilians were murdered by the end of 1939. In addition to leaders of Polish society, they murdered Jews, prostitutes, Romani people, and the mentally ill. Psychiatric patients in Poland were initially murdered by shooting, but by spring 1941 gas vans were widely used.

Seven Einsatzgruppen of battalion strength (around 500 men) operated in Poland. Each was subdivided into five Einsatzkommandos of company strength (around 100 men).

- Einsatzgruppe I, commanded by SS-Standartenführer Bruno Streckenbach, acted with 14th Army
- Einsatzgruppe II, SS-Obersturmbannführer Emanuel Schäfer, acted with 10th Army
- Einsatzgruppe III, SS-Obersturmbannführer und Regierungsrat Herbert Fischer, acted with 8th Army
- Einsatzgruppe IV, SS-Brigadeführer Lothar Beutel, acted with 4th Army
- Einsatzgruppe V, SS-Standartenfürer Ernst Damzog, acted with 3rd Army
- Einsatzgruppe VI, SS-Oberführer Erich Naumann, acted in Wielkopolska
- Einsatzgruppe VII, SS-Obergruppenführer Udo von Woyrsch and SS-Gruppenführer Otto Rasch, acted in Upper Silesia and Cieszyn Silesia

Though they were formally under the command of the army, the Einsatzgruppen received their orders from Heydrich and for the most part acted independently of the army. Many senior army officers were only too glad to leave these genocidal actions to the task forces, as the murders violated the rules of warfare as set down in the Geneva Conventions. However, Hitler had decreed that the army would have to tolerate and even offer logistical support to the Einsatzgruppen when it was tactically possible to do so. Some army commanders complained about unauthorised shootings, looting, and rapes committed by members of the Einsatzgruppen and the Volksdeutscher Selbstschutz, to little effect. For example, when Generaloberst Johannes Blaskowitz sent a memorandum of complaint to Hitler about the atrocities, Hitler dismissed his concerns as "childish", and Blaskowitz was relieved of his post in May 1940. He continued to serve in the army but never received promotion to field marshal.

The final task of the Einsatzgruppen in Poland was to round up the remaining Jews and concentrate them in ghettos within major cities with good railway connections. The intention was to eventually remove all the Jews from Poland, but at this point their final destination had not yet been determined. Together, the Wehrmacht and the Einsatzgruppen also drove tens of thousands of Jews eastward into Soviet-controlled territory.

== Preparations for Operation Barbarossa ==
On 13 March 1941, in the lead-up to Operation Barbarossa, the planned invasion of the Soviet Union, Hitler dictated his "Guidelines in Special Spheres re: Directive No. 21 (Operation Barbarossa)". Sub-paragraph B specified that Reichsführer-SS Heinrich Himmler would be given "special tasks" on direct orders from the Führer, which he would carry out independently. This directive was intended to prevent friction between the Wehrmacht and the SS in the upcoming offensive. Hitler also specified that criminal acts against civilians perpetrated by members of the Wehrmacht during the upcoming campaign would not be prosecuted in the military courts, and thus would go unpunished.

In a speech to his leading generals on 30 March 1941, Hitler described his envisioned war against the Soviet Union. General Franz Halder, the Army's Chief of Staff, described the speech:

Struggle between two ideologies. Scathing evaluation of Bolshevism, equals antisocial criminality. Communism immense future danger ... This a fight to the finish. If we do not accept this, we shall beat the enemy, but in thirty years we shall again confront the Communist foe. We don't make war to preserve the enemy ... Struggle against Russia: Extermination of Bolshevik Commissars and of the Communist intelligentsia ... Commissars and GPU personnel are criminals and must be treated as such. The struggle will differ from that in the west. In the east harshness now means mildness for the future.

Though General Halder did not record any mention of Jews, German historian Andreas Hillgruber argued that because of Hitler's frequent contemporary statements about the coming war of annihilation against "Judeo-Bolshevism", his generals would have understood Hitler's call for the destruction of the Soviet Union as also comprising a call for the destruction of its Jewish population. The genocide was often described using euphemisms such as "special tasks" and "executive measures"; Einsatzgruppe victims were often described as having been shot while trying to escape. In May 1941, Heydrich verbally passed on the order to murder the Soviet Jews to the SiPo NCO School in Pretzsch, where the commanders of the reorganised Einsatzgruppen were being trained for Operation Barbarossa. In spring 1941, Heydrich and General Eduard Wagner successfully completed negotiations for co-operation between the Einsatzgruppen and the German Army to allow the implementation of the "special tasks". Following the Heydrich-Wagner agreement on 28 April 1941, Field Marshal Walther von Brauchitsch ordered that when Operation Barbarossa began, all German Army commanders were to immediately identify and register all Jews in occupied areas in the Soviet Union, and fully co-operate with the Einsatzgruppen.

In further meetings held in June 1941 Himmler outlined to top SS leaders the regime's intention to reduce the population of the Soviet Union by 30 million people, not only through direct murder of those considered racially inferior, but by depriving the remainder of food and other necessities of life.

=== Organisation starting in 1941 ===
For Operation Barbarossa, initially four Einsatzgruppen were created, each numbering 500–990 men to comprise a total force of 3,000. Einsatzgruppen A, B, and C were to be attached to Army Groups North, Centre, and South; Einsatzgruppe D was assigned to the 11th Army. The Einsatzgruppe for Special Purposes operated in eastern Poland starting in July 1941. The Einsatzgruppen were under the control of the RSHA, headed by Heydrich and later by his successor, SS-Obergruppenführer Ernst Kaltenbrunner. Heydrich gave them a mandate to secure the offices and papers of the Soviet state and Communist Party; to liquidate all the higher cadres of the Soviet state; and to instigate and encourage pogroms against Jewish populations. The men of the Einsatzgruppen were recruited from the SD, Gestapo, Kriminalpolizei (Kripo), Orpo, and Waffen-SS. Each Einsatzgruppe was under the operational control of the Higher SS Police Chiefs in its area of operations. In May 1941, General Wagner and SS-Brigadeführer Walter Schellenberg agreed that the Einsatzgruppen in front-line areas were to operate under army command, while the army provided the Einsatzgruppen with all necessary logistical support. Given their main task was defeating the enemy, the army left the pacification of the civilian population to the Einsatzgruppen, who offered support as well as prevented subversion. This did not preclude their participation in acts of violence against civilians, as many members of the Wehrmacht assisted the Einsatzgruppen in rounding up and murdering Jews of their own accord.

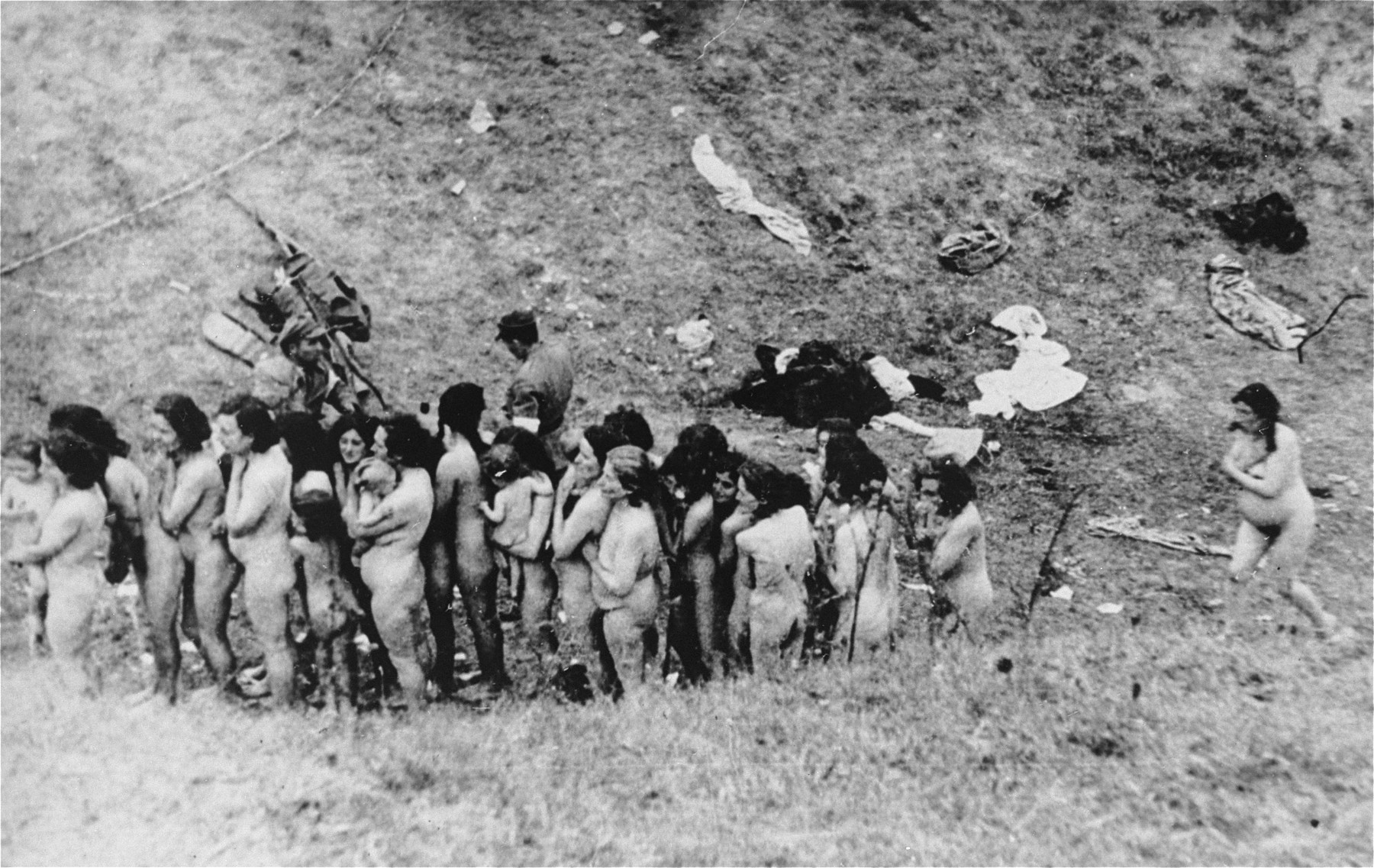
Naked Jewish women from the Mizocz ghetto, some of whom are holding infants, wait in a line before their execution by the Order Police with the assistance of Ukrainian auxiliaries.

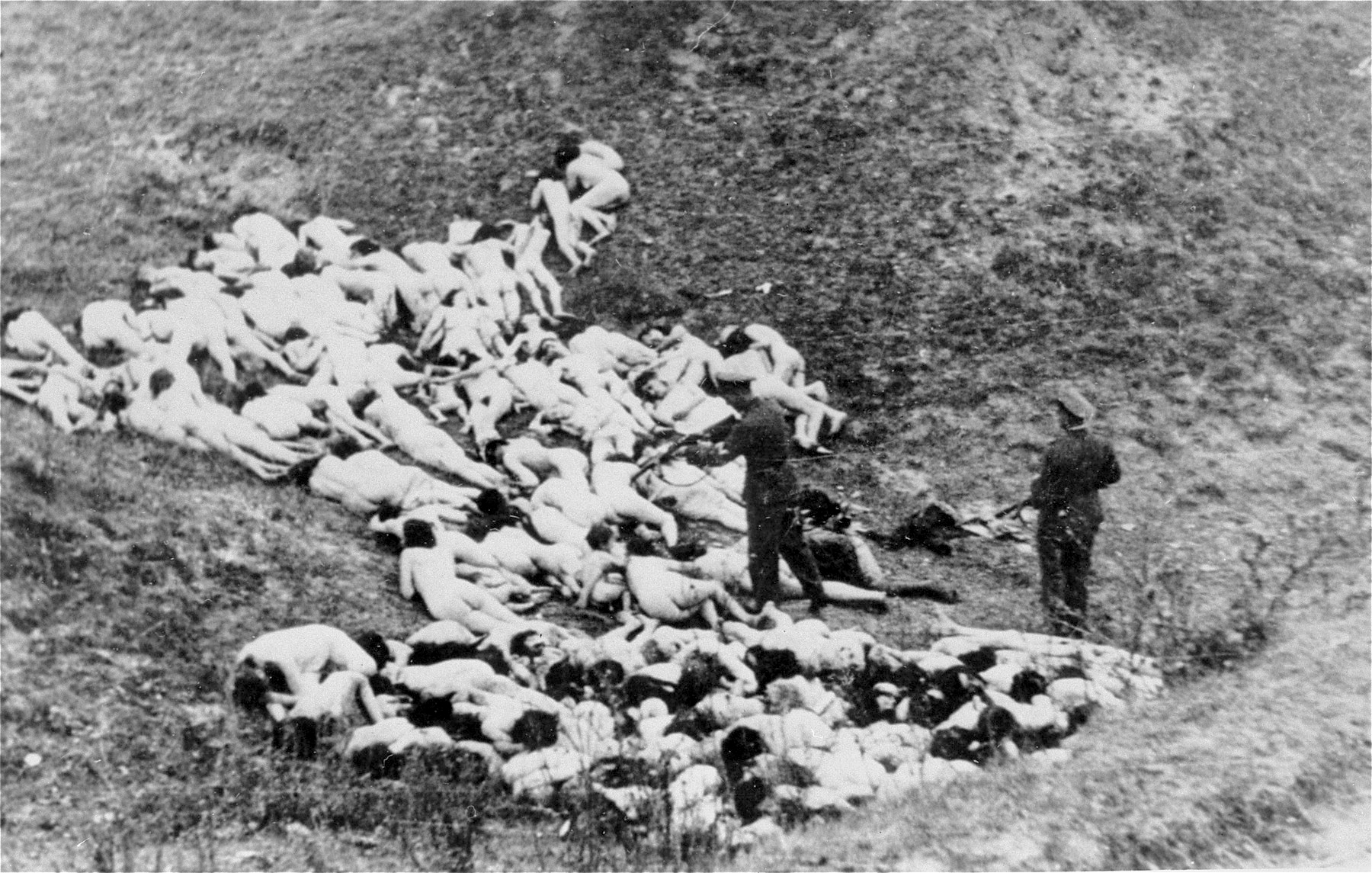
Members of the Order Police execute those who survived the initial shooting.

Heydrich acted under orders from Reichsführer-SS Himmler, who supplied security forces on an "as needed" basis to the local SS and Police Leaders. Led by SD, Gestapo, and Kripo officers, Einsatzgruppen included recruits from the Orpo, Security Service and Waffen-SS, augmented by uniformed volunteers from the local auxiliary police force. Each Einsatzgruppe was supplemented with Waffen-SS and Order Police battalions as well as support personnel such as drivers and radio operators. On average, the Order Police formations were larger and better armed, with heavy machine-gun detachments, which enabled them to carry out operations beyond the capability of the SS. Each death squad followed an assigned army group as they advanced into the Soviet Union. During the course of their operations, the Einsatzgruppen commanders received assistance from the Wehrmacht. Activities ranged from the murder of targeted groups of individuals named on carefully prepared lists, to joint citywide operations with SS Einsatzgruppen which lasted for two or more days, such as the massacres at Babi Yar, perpetrated by the Police Battalion 45, and at Rumbula, by Battalion 22, reinforced by local Schutzmannschaften (auxiliary police). The SS brigades, wrote historian Christopher Browning, were "only the thin cutting edge of German units that became involved in political and racial mass murder."

Many Einsatzgruppe leaders were highly educated; for example, nine of seventeen leaders of Einsatzgruppe A held doctorate degrees. Three Einsatzgruppen were commanded by holders of doctorates, one of whom (SS-Gruppenführer Otto Rasch) held a double doctorate.

Additional Einsatzgruppen were created as additional territories were occupied. Einsatzgruppe E operated in Independent State of Croatia under three commanders, SS-Obersturmbannführer Ludwig Teichmann, SS-Standartenführer Günther Herrmann, and lastly SS-Standartenführer Wilhelm Fuchs. The unit was subdivided into five Einsatzkommandos located in Vinkovci, Sarajevo, Banja Luka, Knin, and Zagreb. Einsatzgruppe F worked with Army Group South. Einsatzgruppe G operated in Romania, Hungary, and Ukraine, commanded by SS-Standartenführer Josef Kreuzer. Einsatzgruppe H was assigned to Slovakia. Einsatzgruppen K and L, under SS-Oberführer Emanuel Schäfer and SS-Standartenführer Ludwig Hahn, worked alongside 5th and 6th Panzer Armies during the Ardennes offensive. Hahn had previously been in command of Einsatzgruppe Griechenland in Greece.

Other Einsatzgruppen and Einsatzkommandos included Einsatzgruppe Iltis (operated in Carinthia, on the border between Slovenia and Austria) under SS-Standartenführer Paul Blobel, Einsatzgruppe Jugoslawien (Yugoslavia) Einsatzkommando Luxemburg (Luxembourg), Einsatzgruppe Norwegen (Norway) commanded by SS-Oberführer Franz Walter Stahlecker, Einsatzgruppe Serbien (Yugoslavia) under SS-Standartenführer Wilhelm Fuchs and SS-Gruppenführer August Meysner, Einsatzkommando Tilsit (Lithuania, Poland), and Einsatzgruppe Tunis (Tunis), commanded by SS-Obersturmbannführer Walter Rauff.

== Killings in the Soviet Union ==
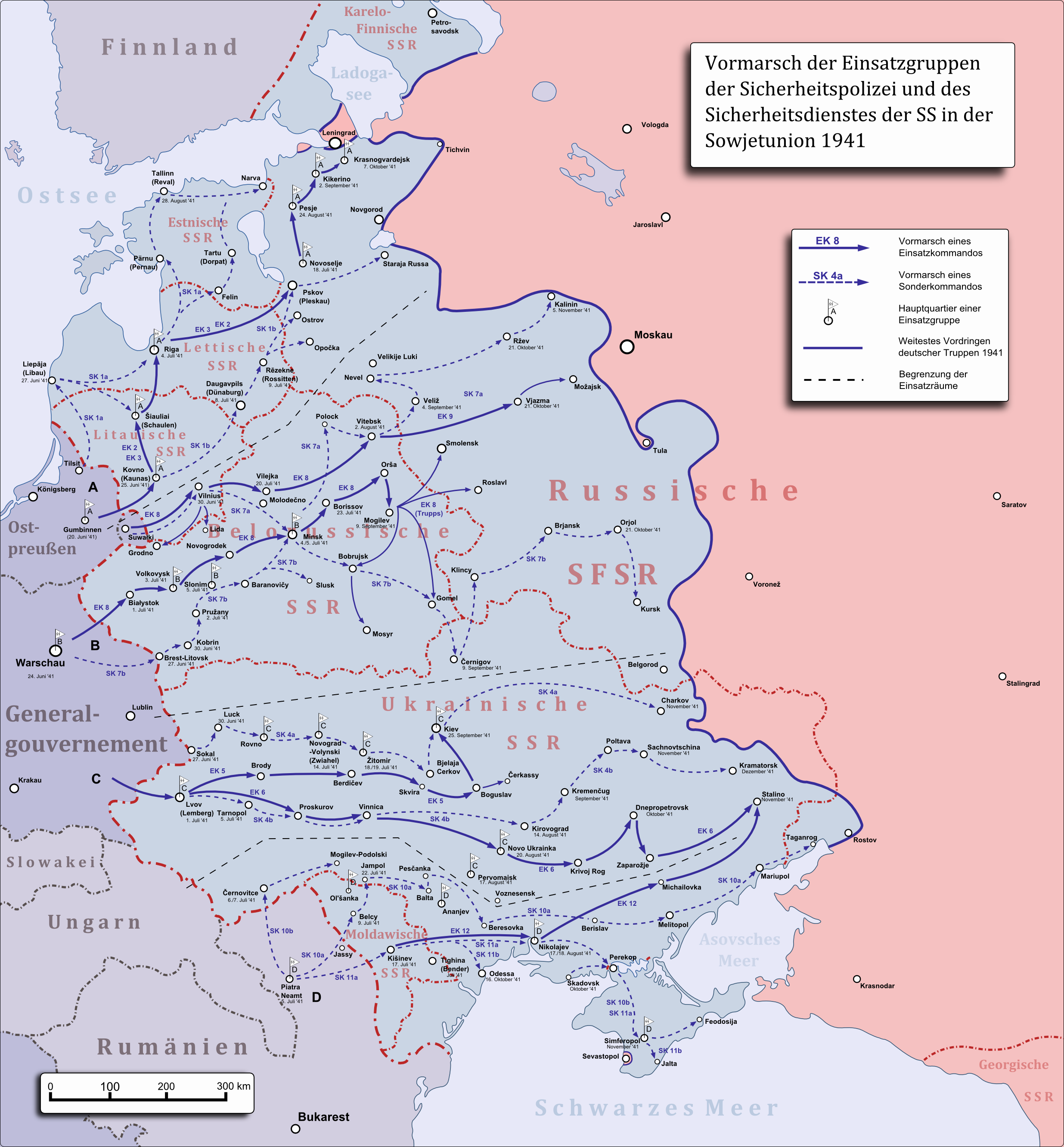
Map of the Einsatzgruppen operations behind the German-Soviet frontier with the location of the first shooting of Jewish men, women and children, 30 July 1941

After the invasion of the Soviet Union on 22 June 1941, the Einsatzgruppen's main assignment was to kill civilians, as in Poland, but this time its targets specifically included Soviet Communist Party commissars and Jews. In a letter dated 2 July 1941 Heydrich communicated to his SS and Police Leaders that the Einsatzgruppen were to execute all senior and middle ranking Comintern officials; all senior and middle ranking members of the central, provincial, and district committees of the Communist Party; extremist and radical Communist Party members; people's commissars; and Jews in party and government posts. Open-ended instructions were given to execute "other radical elements (saboteurs, propagandists, snipers, assassins, agitators, etc.)." He instructed that any pogroms spontaneously initiated by the population of the occupied territories were to be quietly encouraged.

On 8 July, Heydrich announced that all Jews were to be regarded as partisans, and gave the order for all male Jews between the ages of 15 and 45 to be shot. On 17 July Heydrich ordered that the Einsatzgruppen were to murder all Jewish Red Army prisoners of war, plus all Red Army prisoners of war from Georgia and Central Asia, as they too might be Jews. Unlike in Germany, where the Nuremberg Laws of 1935 defined as Jewish anyone with at least three Jewish grandparents, the Einsatzgruppen defined as Jewish anyone with at least one Jewish grandparent; in either case, whether or not the person practised the religion was irrelevant. The unit was also assigned to exterminate Romani people and the mentally ill. It was common practice for the Einsatzgruppen to shoot hostages.

As the invasion began, the Germans pursued the fleeing Red Army, leaving a security vacuum. Reports surfaced of Soviet guerrilla activity in the area, with local Jews immediately suspected of collaboration. Heydrich ordered his officers to incite anti-Jewish pogroms in the newly occupied territories. Pogroms, some of which were orchestrated by the Einsatzgruppen, broke out in Latvia, Lithuania, and Ukraine. Within the first few weeks of Operation Barbarossa, 10,000 Jews had been murdered in 40 pogroms, and by the end of 1941 some 60 pogroms had taken place, claiming as many as 24,000 victims. However, SS-Brigadeführer Franz Walter Stahlecker, commander of Einsatzgruppe A, reported to his superiors in mid-October that the residents of Kaunas were not spontaneously starting pogroms, and secret assistance by the Germans was required. A similar reticence was noted by Einsatzgruppe B in Russia and Belarus and Einsatzgruppe C in Ukraine; the further east the Einsatzgruppen travelled, the less likely the residents were to be prompted into murdering their Jewish neighbours.

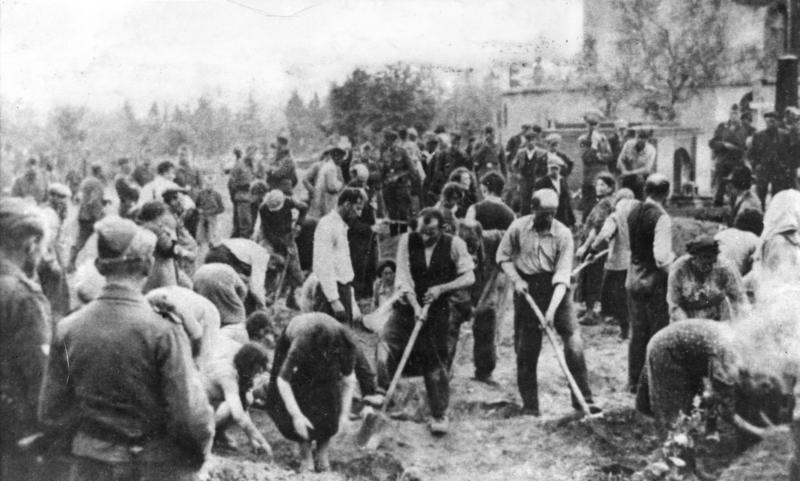
Jews forced to dig their own graves in Zboriv, Ukraine, 5 July 1941

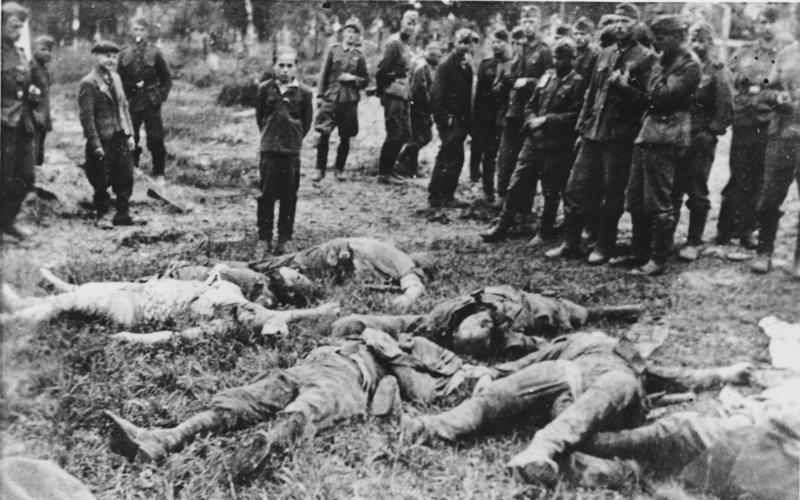
A teenage boy stands beside his murdered family shortly before his own murder. Zboriv, Ukraine, 5 July 1941.

All four main Einsatzgruppen took part in mass shootings from the early days of the war. Initially the targets were adult Jewish men, but by August the net had been widened to include women, children, and the elderly—the entire Jewish population. Initially there was a semblance of legality given to the shootings, with trumped-up charges being read out (arson, sabotage, black marketeering, or refusal to work, for example) and victims being murdered by a firing squad. As this method proved too slow, the Einsatzkommandos began to take their victims out in larger groups and shot them next to, or even inside, mass graves that had been prepared. Some Einsatzkommandos started to use automatic weapons, with survivors being murdered with a pistol shot.

As word of the massacres got out, many Jews fled; in Ukraine, 70 to 90 per cent of the Jews ran away. This was seen by the leader of Einsatzkommando VI as beneficial, as it would save the regime the costs of deporting the victims further east over the Urals. In other areas the invasion was so successful that the Einsatzgruppen had insufficient forces to immediately murder all the Jews in the conquered territories. A situation report from Einsatzgruppe C in September 1941 noted that not all Jews were members of the Bolshevist apparatus, and suggested that the total elimination of Jewry would have a negative impact on the economy and the food supply. The Nazis began to round their victims up into concentration camps and ghettos and rural districts were for the most part rendered Judenfrei (free of Jews). Jewish councils were set up in major cities and forced labour gangs were established to make use of the Jews as slave labour until they were all dead, a goal that was postponed until 1942.

The Einsatzgruppen used public hangings as a terror tactic against the local population. An Einsatzgruppe B report, dated 9 October 1941, described one such hanging. Due to suspected partisan activity near Demidov, all male residents aged 15 to 55 were put in a camp to be screened. The screening produced seventeen people who were identified as "partisans" and "Communists". Five members of the group were hanged while 400 local residents were assembled to watch; the rest were shot.

=== Babi Yar ===
The largest mass shooting perpetrated by the Einsatzgruppen took place on 29 and 30 September 1941 at Babi Yar, a ravine northwest of Kiev city center in Ukraine that had fallen to the Germans on 19 September. The perpetrators included a company of Waffen-SS attached to Einsatzgruppe C under Rasch, members of Sonderkommando 4a under SS-Obergruppenführer Friedrich Jeckeln, and some Ukrainian auxiliary police. The Jews of Kiev were told to report to a certain street corner on 29 September; anyone who disobeyed would be shot. Since word of massacres in other areas had not yet reached Kiev and the assembly point was near the train station, they assumed they were being deported. People showed up at the rendezvous point in large numbers, laden with possessions and food for the journey.

After being marched three kilometres (two miles) northwest of the city centre, the victims encountered a barbed wire barrier and numerous Ukrainian police and German troops. Thirty or forty people at a time were told to leave their possessions and were escorted through a narrow passageway lined with soldiers brandishing clubs. Anyone who tried to escape was beaten. Soon the victims reached an open area, where they were forced to strip, and then were herded down into the ravine. People were forced to lie down in rows on top of the bodies of other victims, and they were shot in the back of the head or the neck by members of the execution squads.

The murders continued for two days, claiming a total of 33,771 victims. Sand was shovelled and bulldozed over the bodies and the sides of the ravine were dynamited to bring down more material. Anton Heidborn, a member of Sonderkommando 4a, later testified that three days later that there were still people alive among the corpses. Heidborn spent the next few days helping smooth out the "millions" of banknotes taken from the victims' possessions. The clothing was taken away, destined to be re-used by German citizens. Jeckeln's troops shot more than 100,000 Jews by the end of October.

== Killings in Lithuania, Latvia, and Estonia ==
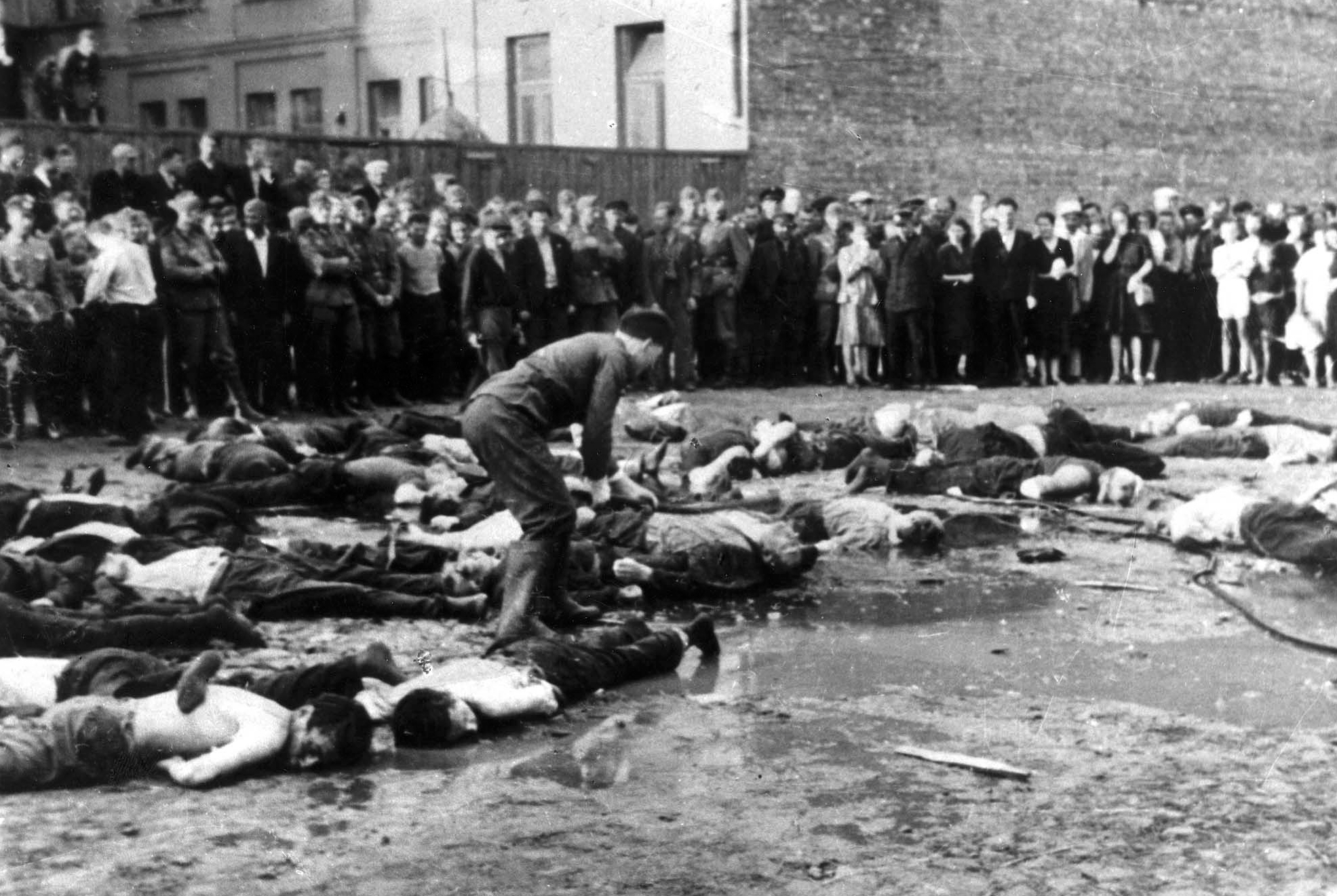
Massacre of Jews in Lietūkis garage on 27 June 1941 during the Kaunas pogrom

Einsatzgruppe A operated in Baltic states of Lithuania, Latvia, and Estonia (the three Baltic countries which had been occupied by the Soviet Union in 1940–1941). According to its own reports to Himmler, Einsatzgruppe A murdered almost 140,000 people in the five months following the 1941 German invasion: 136,421 Jews, 1,064 Communists, 653 people with mental illnesses, 56 partisans, 44 Poles, five Romani, and one Armenian were reported murdered between 22 June and 25 November 1941.

Upon entering Kaunas, Lithuania, on 25 June 1941, the Einsatzgruppe released the criminals from the local jail and encouraged them to join the pogrom which was underway. Between 23 and 27 June 1941, 4,000 Jews were murdered on the streets of Kaunas and in nearby open pits and ditches. Particularly active in the Kaunas pogrom was the so-called "Death Dealer of Kaunas", a young man who murdered Jews with a crowbar at the Lietukis Garage before a large crowd that cheered each murder with much applause; he occasionally paused to play the Lithuanian national anthem "Tautiška giesmė" on his accordion before resuming the murders.

As Einsatzgruppe A advanced into Lithuania, it actively recruited local nationalists and antisemitic groups. In July 1941, local Lithuanian collaborators, pejoratively called "White Armbands" (Lithuanian: Baltaraiščiai, lit. 'People with white armbands'), joined the massacres. A pogrom in the Latvian capital Riga in early July 1941 killed 400 Jews. Latvian nationalist Viktors Arājs and his supporters undertook a campaign of arson against synagogues. On 2 July, Einsatzgruppe A commander Stahlecker appointed Arājs to head the Arajs Kommando, a Sonderkommando of about 300 men, mostly university students. Together, Einsatzgruppe A and the Arājs Kommando murdered 2,300 Jews in Riga on 6–7 July. Within six months, Arājs and collaborators would murder about half of Latvia's Jewish population.

Local officials, the Selbstschutz, and the Hilfspolizei (Auxiliary Police) played a key role in rounding up and massacring local Jews in German-occupied Lithuania, Latvia, and Estonia. These groups also helped the Einsatzgruppen and other killing units to identify Jews. For example, in Latvia, the Hilfspolizei, consisting of auxiliary police organised by the Germans and recruited from former Latvian army and police officers, ex-Aizsargi, members of the Pērkonkrusts, and university students, assisted in the murder of Latvia's Jewish citizens. Similar units were created elsewhere, and provided much of the manpower for the Holocaust in Eastern Europe.

With the creation of units such as the Arājs Kommando in Latvia and the Rollkommando Hamann in Lithuania, the attacks changed from the spontaneous mob violence of the pogroms to more systematic massacres. With extensive local help, Einsatzgruppe A was the first Einsatzgruppe to attempt to systematically exterminate all the Jews in its area. Latvian historian Modris Eksteins wrote:

Of the roughly 83,000 Jews who fell into German hands in Latvia, not more than 900 survived; and of the more than 20,000 Western Jews sent into Latvia, only some 800 lived through the deportation until liberation. This was the highest percentage of eradication in all of Europe.

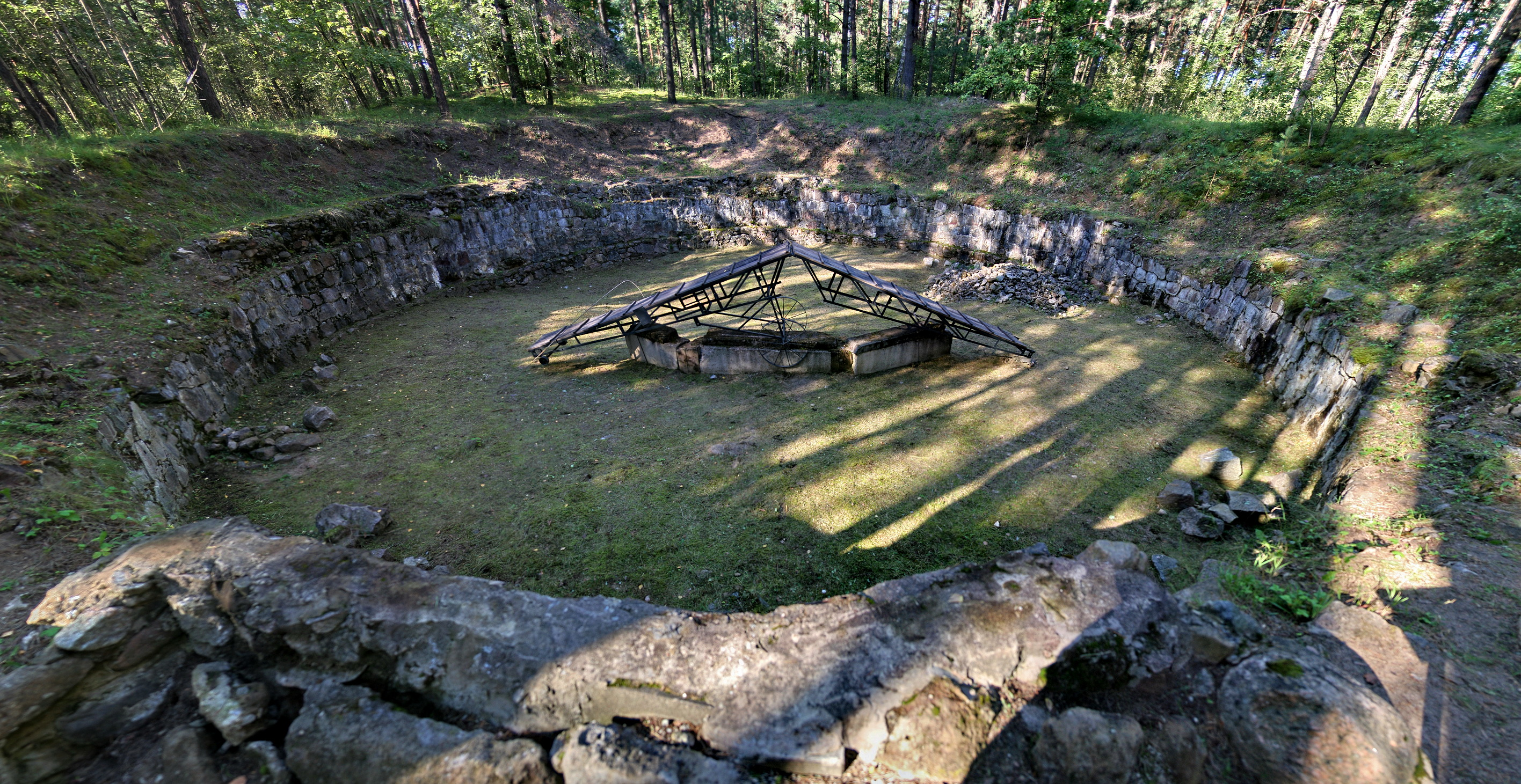
Pit where bodies were burned after the Ponary massacre

In late 1941, the Einsatzkommandos settled into headquarters in Kaunas, Riga, and Tallinn. Einsatzgruppe A grew less mobile and faced problems because of its small size. The Germans relied increasingly on the Latvian Arājs Kommando and similar groups to perform massacres of Jews.

Such extensive and enthusiastic collaboration with the Einsatzgruppen has been attributed to several factors. Since the Russian Revolution of 1905, the Kresy Wschodnie and other borderlands had experienced a political culture of violence. The 1940–1941 Soviet occupation had been profoundly traumatic for residents of the Baltic states and areas that had been part of Poland until 1939; the population was brutalised and terrorised, and the existing familiar structures of society were destroyed.

Historian Erich Haberer has suggested that many survived and made sense of the "totalitarian atomization" of society by seeking conformity with communism. As a result, by the time of the German invasion in 1941, many had come to see conformity with a totalitarian regime as socially acceptable behaviour; thus, people simply transferred their allegiance to the German regime when it arrived. Some who had collaborated with the Soviet regime sought to divert attention from themselves by naming Jews as collaborators and murdering them.

=== Rumbula ===
In November 1941 Himmler was dissatisfied with the pace of the exterminations in Latvia, as he intended to move Jews from Germany into the area. He assigned SS-Obergruppenführer Jeckeln, one of the perpetrators of the Babi Yar massacre, to liquidate the Riga ghetto. Jeckeln selected a site about 10 km (6 mi) southeast of Riga near the Rumbula railway station, and had 300 Russian prisoners of war prepare the site by digging pits in which to bury the victims. Jeckeln organised around 1,700 men, including 300 members of the Arajs Kommando, 50 German SD men, and 50 Latvian guards, most of whom had already participated in mass-murdering of civilians. These troops were supplemented by Latvians, including members of the Riga city police, battalion police, and ghetto guards. Around 1,500 able-bodied Jews would be spared execution so their slave labour could be exploited; a thousand men were relocated to a fenced-off area within the ghetto and 500 women were temporarily housed in a prison and later moved to a separate nearby ghetto, where they were put to work mending uniforms.

Although Rumbula was on the rail line, Jeckeln decided that the victims should travel on foot from Riga to the execution ground. Trucks and buses were arranged to carry children and the elderly. The victims were told that they were being relocated, and were advised to bring up to 20 kg (44 lb) of possessions. The first day of executions, 30 November 1941, began with the perpetrators rousing and assembling the victims at 4:00 am. The victims were moved in columns of a thousand people toward the execution ground. As they walked, some SS men went up and down the line, shooting people who could not keep up the pace or who tried to run away or rest.

When the columns neared the prepared execution site, the victims were driven some 270 metres (300 yd) from the road into the forest, where any possessions that had not yet been abandoned were seized. Here the victims were split into groups of fifty and taken deeper into the forest, near the pits, where they were ordered to strip. The victims were driven into the prepared trenches, made to lie down, and shot in the head or the back of the neck by members of Jeckeln's bodyguard. Around 13,000 Jews from Riga were murdered at the pits that day, along with a thousand Jews from Berlin who had just arrived by train. On the second day of the operation, 8 December 1941, the remaining 10,000 Jews of Riga were murdered in the same way. About a thousand were murdered on the streets of the city or on the way to the site, bringing the total number of victims for the two-day extermination to 25,000 people. For his part in organising the massacre, Jeckeln was promoted to Leader of the SS Upper Section, Ostland.

== Second sweep ==
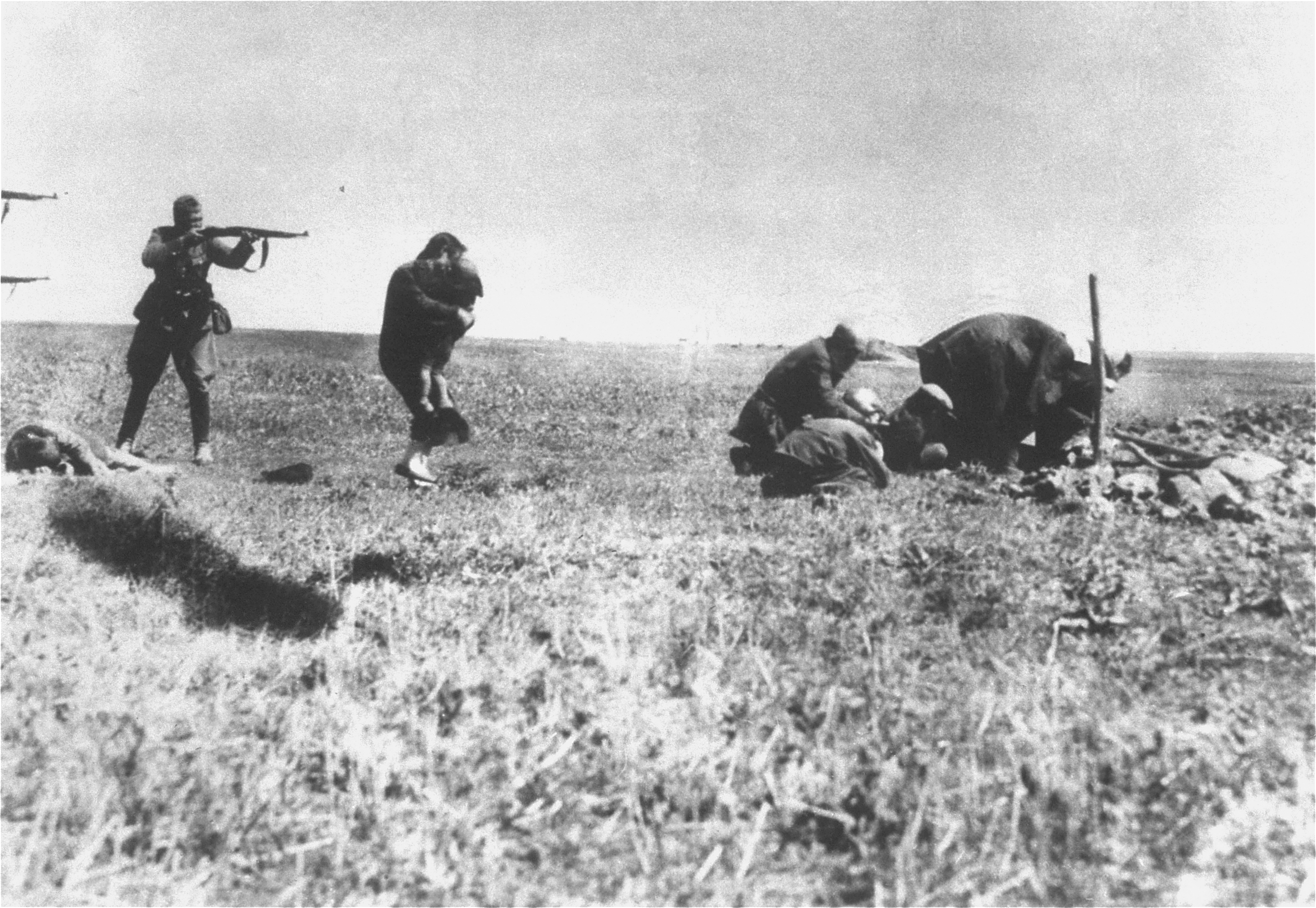
The Ivanhorod Einsatzgruppen photograph: the murdering of Jews in Ivanhorod, Ukraine, 1942. A woman is attempting to protect a child with her own body just before they are fired upon with rifles at close range.

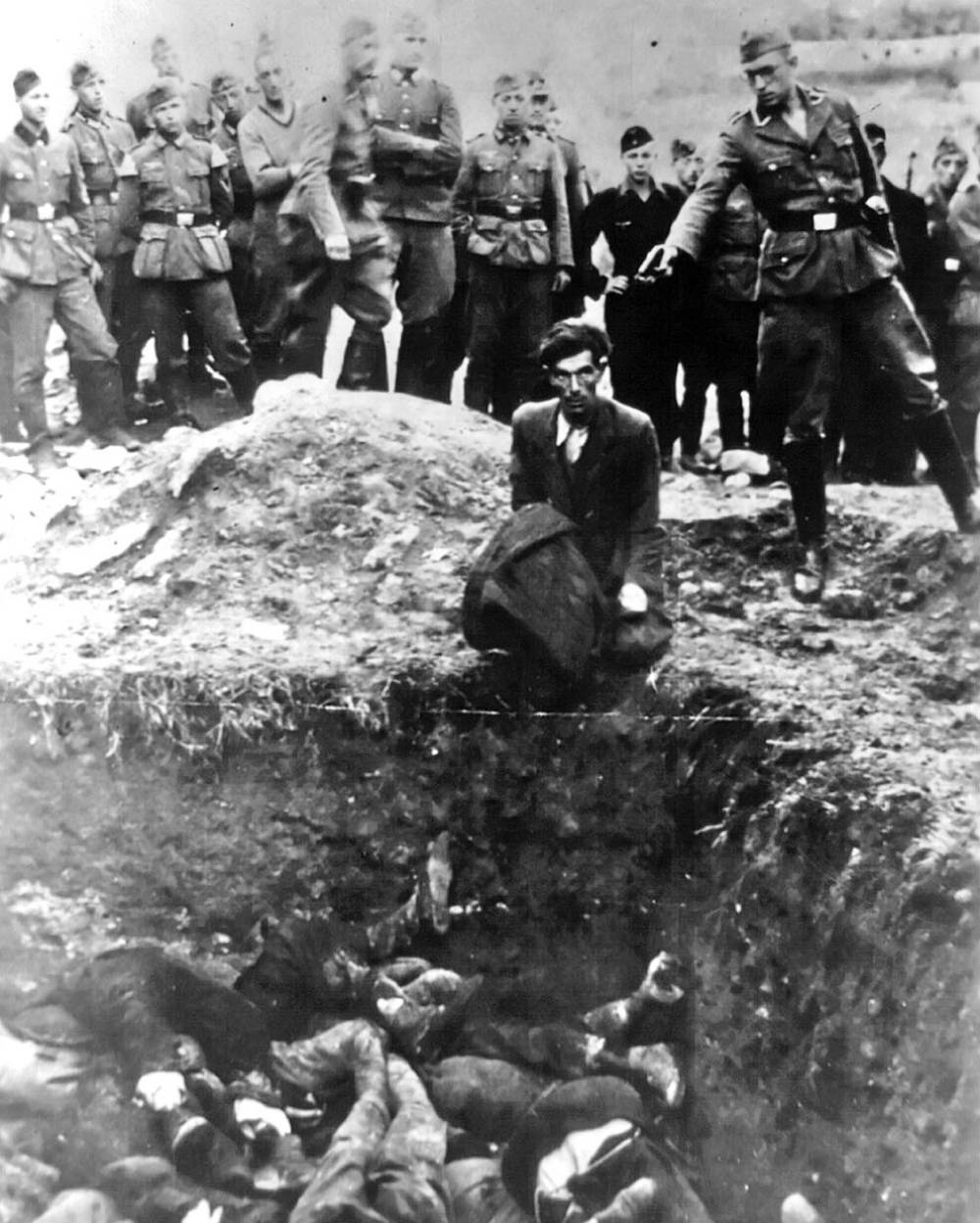
A member of Einsatzgruppe D is about to shoot a man sitting by a mass grave in Winniza, Ukraine, in 1942. Present in the background are members of the German Army, the German Labor Service, and former Hitler Youth. The back of the photograph is inscribed "The last Jew in Vinnitsa".

Einsatzgruppe B, C, and D did not immediately follow Einsatzgruppe A's example in systematically murdering all Jews in their areas. The Einsatzgruppe commanders, with the exception of Einsatzgruppe A's Stahlecker, were of the opinion by the fall of 1941 that it was impossible to murder the entire Jewish population of the Soviet Union in one sweep, and thought the murders should stop. An Einsatzgruppe report dated 17 September advised that the Germans would be better off using any skilled Jews as labourers rather than shooting them. Also, in some areas poor weather and a lack of transportation led to a slowdown in deportations of Jews from points further west. Thus, an interval passed between the first round of Einsatzgruppen massacres in summer and fall, and what American historian Raul Hilberg called the second sweep, which started in December 1941 and lasted into the summer of 1942. During the interval, the surviving Jews were forced into ghettos.

Einsatzgruppe A had already murdered almost all Jews in its area, so it shifted its operations into Belarus to assist Einsatzgruppe B. In Dnepropetrovsk in February 1942, Einsatzgruppe D reduced the city's Jewish population from 30,000 to 702 over the course of four days. The German Order Police and local collaborators provided the extra manpower needed to perform all the shootings. Haberer wrote that, as in the Baltic states, the Germans could not have murdered so many Jews so quickly without local help. He points out that the ratio of Order Police to auxiliaries was 1 to 10 in both Ukraine and Belarus. In rural areas the proportion was 1 to 20. This meant that most Ukrainian and Belarusian Jews were murdered by fellow Ukrainians and Belarusians commanded by German officers rather than by Germans.

The second wave of exterminations in the Soviet Union met with armed resistance in some areas, though the chance of success was poor. Weapons were typically primitive or home-made. Communications were impossible between ghettos in various cities, so there was no way to create a unified strategy. Few in the ghetto leadership supported resistance for fear of reprisals on the ghetto residents. Mass break-outs were sometimes attempted, though survival in the forest was nearly impossible due to the lack of food and the fact that escapees were often tracked down and murdered.

== Transition to gassing ==
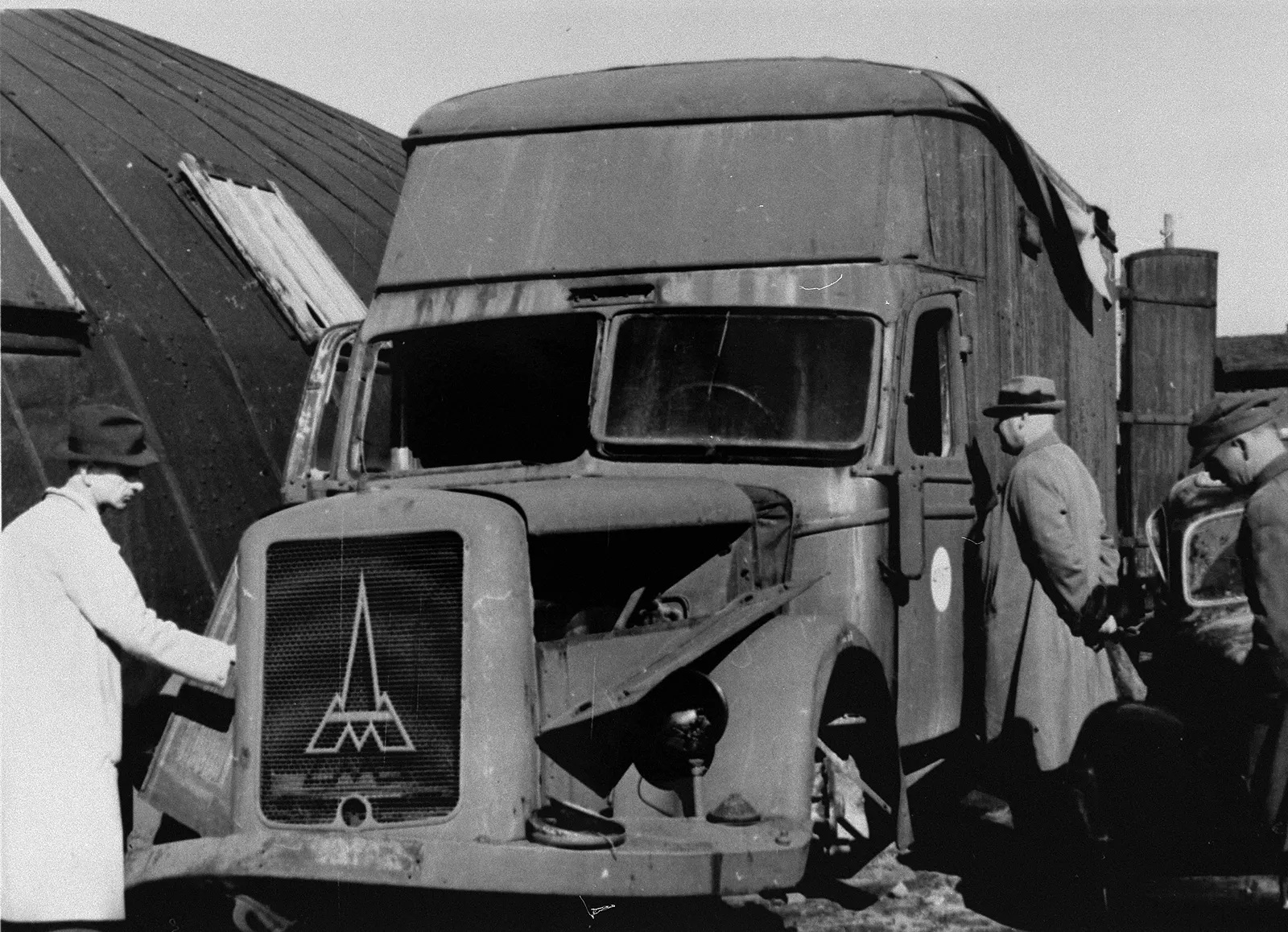
Magirus-Deutz van found near Chełmno extermination camp is the same type as those used as gas vans.

After a time, Himmler found that the killing methods used by the Einsatzgruppen were inefficient: they were costly, demoralising for the troops, and sometimes did not kill the victims quickly enough. Many of the troops found the massacres to be difficult if not impossible to perform. Some of the perpetrators suffered physical and mental health problems, and many turned to drink. As much as possible, the Einsatzgruppen leaders militarized the genocide. The historian Christian Ingrao notes an attempt was made to make the shootings a collective act without individual responsibility. Framing the shootings in this way was not psychologically sufficient for every perpetrator to feel absolved of guilt. Browning notes three categories of potential perpetrators: those who were eager to participate right from the start, those who participated in spite of moral qualms because they were ordered to do so, and a significant minority who refused to take part. A few men spontaneously became excessively brutal in their killing methods and their zeal for the task. Commander of Einsatzgruppe D, SS-Gruppenführer Otto Ohlendorf, particularly noted this propensity towards excess, and ordered that any man who was too eager to participate or too brutal should not perform any further executions.

During a visit to Minsk in August 1941, Himmler witnessed an Einsatzgruppen mass execution first-hand and concluded that shooting Jews was too stressful for his men. By November he made arrangements for any SS men suffering ill health from having participated in executions to be provided with rest and mental health care. He also decided a transition should be made to gassing the victims, especially the women and children, and ordered the recruitment of expendable native auxiliaries who could assist with the murders. Gas vans, which had been used previously to murder mental patients, began to see service by all four main Einsatzgruppen from 1942. However, the gas vans were not popular with the Einsatzkommandos, because removing the dead bodies from the van and burying them was a horrible ordeal. Prisoners or auxiliaries were often assigned to do this task so as to spare the SS men the trauma. Some of the early mass murders at extermination camps used carbon monoxide fumes produced by diesel engines, similar to the method used in gas vans, but by as early as September 1941 experiments were begun at Auschwitz using Zyklon B, a cyanide-based pesticide gas.

Plans for the total eradication of the Jewish population of Europe—eleven million people—were formalised at the Wannsee Conference, held on 20 January 1942. Some would be worked to death, and the rest would be murdered in the implementation of the Final Solution of the Jewish question (German: Die Endlösung der Judenfrage). Permanent killing centres at Auschwitz, Belzec, Chelmno, Majdanek, Sobibor, Treblinka, and other Nazi extermination camps replaced mobile death squads as the primary method of mass-murder. The Einsatzgruppen remained active, however, and were put to work fighting partisans, particularly in Belarus.

After the defeat at Stalingrad in February 1943, Himmler realised that Germany would likely lose the war, and ordered the formation of a special task force, Sonderaktion 1005, under SS-Standartenführer Paul Blobel. The unit's assignment was to visit mass graves all along the Eastern Front to exhume bodies and burn them in an attempt to cover up the genocide. The task remained unfinished at the end of the war, and many mass graves remain unmarked and unexcavated.

By 1944 the Red Army had begun to push the German forces out of Eastern Europe, and the Einsatzgruppen retreated alongside the Wehrmacht. By late 1944, most Einsatzgruppen personnel had been folded into Waffen-SS combat units or transferred to permanent death camps. Hilberg estimates that between 1941 and 1945 the Einsatzgruppen and related agencies killed more than two million people, including 1.3 million Jews. The total number of Jews murdered during the war is estimated at 5.5 to six million people.

== Plans for the Middle East and Britain ==
According to research by German historians Klaus-Michael Mallmann and Martin Cüppers, Einsatzkommando Egypt, led by Walter Rauff, was formed in 1942 in Athens. The unit was to enter Egypt and Mandatory Palestine once German forces arrived there. According to Mallmann and Cüppers, the unit's purpose was to carry out mass-murder of the Jewish populations in those areas. Given its initially small staff of only 24 men, Mallmann and Cüppers point to the further history of the unit, when it was quickly enlarged to more than four times its original strength during its deployment in Tunisia. Furthermore they assume that the commando would have been supported in the annihilation of the Jews by local collaborators, like it happened with the Einsatzgruppen in Eastern Europe.

Former Iraqi prime minister Rashid Ali al-Gaylani and the Grand Mufti of Jerusalem Haj Amin al-Husseini played roles, engaging in antisemitic radio propaganda, preparing to recruit volunteers, and in raising an Arab-German Battalion that would also follow Einsatzkommando Egypt to the Middle East. On 20 July 1942 Rauff was sent to Tobruk to report to Field Marshal Erwin Rommel, Commander of the Afrika Korps. Since Rommel was 500 km away at the First Battle of El Alamein, it is unlikely that the two met. The plans for Einsatzgruppe Egypt were set aside after the Allied victory at the Second Battle of El Alamein.

Had Operation Sea Lion—the German plan for an invasion of the United Kingdom—been launched, six Einsatzgruppen were scheduled to follow the invasion force into Britain. They were provided with a list called the Sonderfahndungsliste, G.B. ('Special Search List, G.B'), known as The Black Book after the war, of 2,300 people to be immediately imprisoned by the Gestapo. The list included Churchill, members of the cabinet, prominent journalists and authors, and members of the Czechoslovak government-in-exile.

== Jäger Report ==
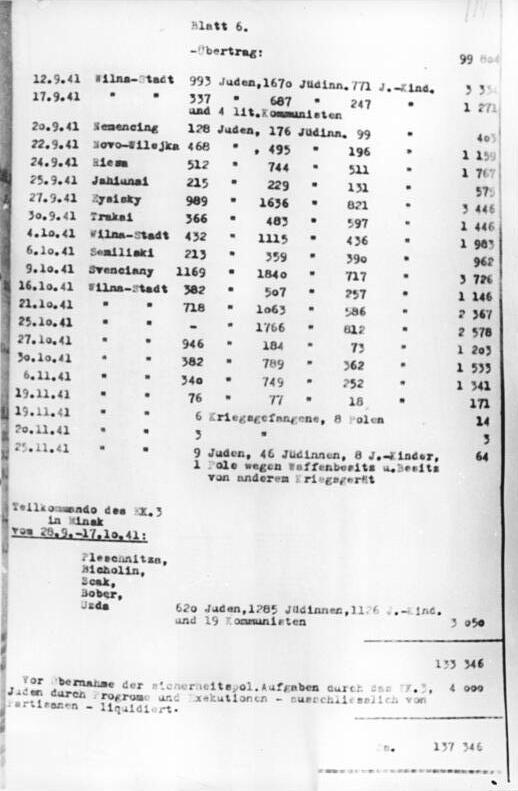
Page 6 of the Jäger Report shows the number of people murdered by Einsatzkommando III alone in the five-month period covered by the report as 137,346.

The Einsatzgruppen kept official records of many of their massacres and provided detailed reports to their superiors. The Jäger Report, filed by Commander SS-Standartenführer Karl Jäger on 1 December 1941 to his superior, Stahlecker (head of Einsatzgruppe A), covers the activities of Einsatzkommando III in Lithuania over the five-month period from 2 July 1941 to 25 November 1941.

Jäger's report provides an almost daily running total of the liquidations of 137,346 people, the vast majority of them Jews. The report documents the exact date and place of massacres, the number of victims, and their breakdown into categories (Jews, Communists, criminals, and so on). Women were shot from the very beginning, but initially in fewer numbers than men. Children were first included in the tally starting in mid-August, when 3,207 people were murdered in Rokiškis on 15–16 August 1941. For the most part the report does not give any military justification for the murders; people were murdered solely because they were Jews. In total, the report lists over 100 executions in 71 different locations. Jäger wrote: "I can state today that the goal of solving the Jewish problem in Lithuania has been reached by Einsatzkommando 3. There are no more Jews in Lithuania, apart from working Jews and their families." In a February 1942 addendum to the report, Jäger increased the total number of victims to 138,272, giving a breakdown of 48,252 men, 55,556 women, and 34,464 children. Only 1,851 of the victims were non-Jewish.

Jäger escaped capture by the Allies when the war ended. He lived in Heidelberg under his own name until his report was discovered in March 1959. Arrested and charged, Jäger committed suicide on 22 June 1959 in Hohenasperg Fortress while awaiting trial for his crimes.

== Involvement of the Wehrmacht ==
The murders took place with the knowledge and support of the German Army in the east. As ordered by Hitler, the Wehrmacht cooperated with the Einsatzgruppen, providing logistical support for their operations, and participated in the mass killings. On 10 October 1941 Field Marshal Walther von Reichenau drafted an order to be read to the German Sixth Army on the Eastern Front. Now known as the Severity Order, it read in part:

The most important objective of this campaign against the Jewish-Bolshevik system is the complete destruction of its sources of power and the extermination of the Asiatic influence in European civilization ... In this eastern theatre, the soldier is not only a man fighting in accordance with the rules of the art of war, but also the ruthless standard bearer of a national conception ... For this reason the soldier must learn fully to appreciate the necessity for the severe but just retribution that must be meted out to the subhuman species of Jewry.

Field Marshal Gerd von Rundstedt of Army Group South expressed his "complete agreement" with the order. He sent out a circular to the generals under his command urging them to release their own versions and to impress upon their troops the need to exterminate the Jews. General Erich von Manstein, in an order to his troops on 20 November, stated that "the Jewish-Bolshevist system must be exterminated once and for all." Manstein sent a letter to Einsatzgruppe D commanding officer Ohlendorf complaining that it was unfair that the SS was keeping all of the murdered Jews' wristwatches for themselves instead of sharing with the Army.

Beyond this trivial complaint, the Army and the Einsatzgruppen worked closely and effectively. On 6 July 1941 Einsatzkommando 4b of Einsatzgruppe C reported that "Armed forces surprisingly welcome hostility against the Jews". Few complaints about the murders were ever raised by Wehrmacht officers. On 8 September, Einsatzgruppe D reported that relations with the German Army were "excellent". In the same month, Stahlecker of Einsatzgruppe A wrote that Army Group North had been exemplary in co-operating with the exterminations and that relations with the 4th Panzer Army, commanded by General Erich Hoepner, were "very close, almost cordial". In the south, the Romanian Army worked closely with Einsatzgruppe D to massacre Ukrainian Jews, murdering around 26,000 Jews in the Odessa massacre. The German historian Peter Longerich thinks it probable that the Wehrmacht, along with the Organization of Ukrainian Nationalists (OUN), incited the Lviv pogroms, during which 8,500 to 9,000 Jews were murdered by the native population and Einsatzgruppe C in July 1941. Moreover, most people on the home front in Germany had some idea of the massacres being committed by the Einsatzgruppen. British historian Hugh Trevor-Roper noted that although Himmler had forbidden photographs of the murders, it was common for both the men of the Einsatzgruppen and for bystanders to take pictures to send to their loved ones, which he felt suggested widespread approval of the massacres.

Officers in the field were well aware of the killing operations being conducted by the Einsatzgruppen. The Wehrmacht tried to justify their considerable involvement in the Einsatzgruppen massacres as being anti-partisan operations rather than racist attacks, but Hillgruber wrote that this was just an excuse. He states that those German generals who claimed that the Einsatzgruppen were a necessary anti-partisan response were lying, and maintained that the slaughter of about 2.2 million defenceless civilians for reasons of racist ideology cannot be justified.

== Einsatzgruppen trials ==
Most of the surviving perpetrators of Nazi war crimes were never charged, and returned unremarked to civilian life. The West German government only charged about 100 former Einsatzgruppen members with war crimes. As time went on, it became more difficult to obtain prosecutions; witnesses grew older and were less likely to be able to offer valuable testimony. Funding for trials was inadequate, and the governments of Austria and Germany became less interested in obtaining convictions for wartime events, preferring to forget the Nazi past.

=== 1947–1948 trial ===
After the close of World War II, 24 senior leaders of the Einsatzgruppen were prosecuted in the Einsatzgruppen trial in 1947–48, part of the Subsequent Nuremberg Trials held under United States military authority. The men were charged with crimes against humanity, war crimes, and membership in the SS (which had been declared a criminal organization). Fourteen death sentences and two life sentences were among the judgments; only four executions were carried out, on 7 June 1951; the rest were reduced to lesser sentences. Four additional Einsatzgruppe leaders were later tried and executed by other nations.

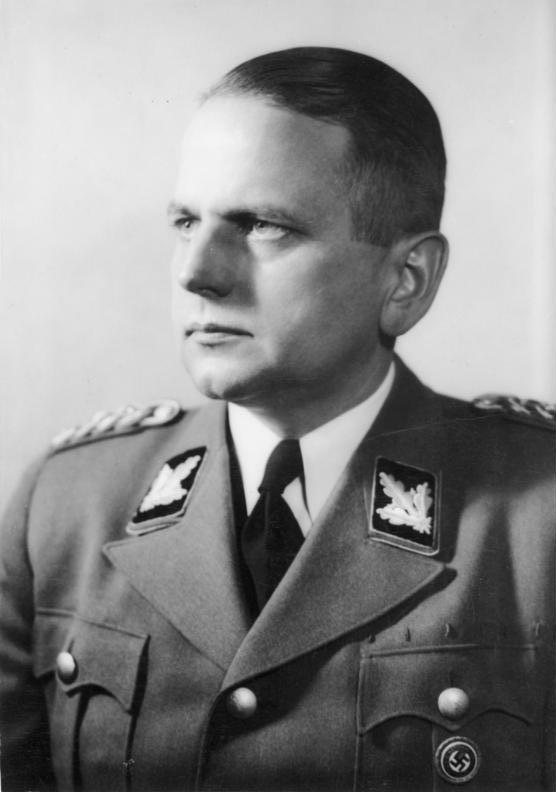
Otto Ohlendorf, 1943

Several Einsatzgruppen leaders, including Ohlendorf, claimed at the trial to have received an order before Operation Barbarossa requiring them to murder all Soviet Jews. To date no evidence has been found that such an order was ever issued. German prosecutor Alfred Streim noted that if such an order had been given, post-war courts would only have been able to convict the Einsatzgruppen leaders as accomplices to mass murder. However, if it could be established that the Einsatzgruppen had committed mass murder without orders, then they could have been convicted as perpetrators of mass murder, and hence could have received stiffer sentences, including capital punishment.

Streim postulated that the existence of an early comprehensive order was a fabrication created for use in Ohlendorf's defence. This theory is now widely accepted by historians. Longerich notes that most orders received by the Einsatzgruppen leaders—especially when they were being ordered to carry out criminal activities—were vague, and couched in terminology that had a specific meaning for members of the regime. Leaders were given briefings about the need to be "severe" and "firm"; all Jews were to be viewed as potential enemies who had to be dealt with ruthlessly. British historian Ian Kershaw argues that Hitler's apocalyptic remarks before Barbarossa about the necessity for a war without mercy to "annihilate" the forces of "Judeo-Bolshevism" were interpreted by Einsatzgruppen commanders as permission and encouragement to engage in extreme antisemitic violence, with each Einsatzgruppen commander to use his own discretion about how far he was prepared to go. According to Erwin Schulz, one of only two of Ohlendorf's codefendants to not attest to his version of events, he only received an order to exterminate all Jews in mid-August 1941. Unlike Ohlendorf, however, Schulz, unwilling to kill women and children, had refused to carry out this order and was subsequently discharged from this duty in a move that did not harm his career in any way.

Prior to the invasion, Schulz testified that Heydrich had told him:

That every one should be sure to understand that, in this fight, Jews would definitely take their part and that, in this fight, everything was set at stake, and the one side which gave in would be the one to be overcome. For that reason, all measures had to be taken against the Jews in particular. The experience in Poland had shown this.

=== 1958 trial ===
The crimes of the Einsatzgruppen came into wider public awareness with the Ulm Einsatzkommando trial in 1958. At the trial, ten former members of Einsatzkommando Tilsit were on trial accused of murdering around 5,500 Jewish men, women, and children in the German-Lithuanian border area in mid-1941. Among them were the heads of the Tilsit task force Hans-Joachim Böhme, Bernhard Fischer-Schweder, and the head of the Tilsit SD section Werner Hersmann. The responsible senior public prosecutor, Erwin Schüle, used as evidence documents from the American Einsatzgruppen trial in Nuremberg, existing specialist literature, SS personnel files, and surviving "USSR event reports".

== See also ==
- Executions in the Valley of Death
- Functionalism versus intentionalism
- Glossary of Nazi Germany
- List of Nazi Party leaders and officials
- Myth of the clean Wehrmacht
- Porajmos
