= Dare (name) =

Dare or Daré is both a surname and a given name. Notable people with the name include:

== Given name ==
- Daré Nibombé (born 1980), footballer from Togo
- Dare Ogunbowale (born 1994), American football player
- Dare Rose (born 2002), American swimmer
- Dare Vršič (born 1984), Slovenian footballer
- Dare Wright (1914–2001), Canadian-American photographer and author

== Surname ==
- Airton Daré (born 1978), Brazilian race car driver
- Alison Dare (born 1965), South African field hockey player
- Ananias Dare (c.1560– c.1587?), British tiler and bricklayer, member of the Roanoke Colony; husband of Eleanor Dare and father of Virginia Dare
- Arthur N. Dare (1850–1923), American Republican politician of Minnesota
- Barbara Dare (born 1963), American pornographic actress
- Bill Dare (died 2025), British radio writer
- Billy Dare (1927–1994), English footballer
- Charles Dare (1854–1924), British naval officer
- Danny Dare (1905–1996), American choreographer, actor, director, writer
- Dorothy Dare (1911–1981), American actress and singer
- Eleanor Dare (c.1563–c.1599?), English colonist and member of the Roanoke Colony; mother of Virginia Dare
- Elkanah Kelsey Dare (1782–1826), American composer
- Irene Dare, young American figure skater and film star
- Johnny Dare, American radio personality
- Joseph Dare (footballer) (born 1991), Australian rules footballer
- Joseph Dare (minister) (1831–1880), Australian Wesleyan Church leader
- Kevin Dare (born 1959), English footballer
- Leona Dare (1854/55–1922), American circus performer
- Marie Dare (1902–1976), Scottish cellist and composer
- Michael Dare (1917–1996), Canadian general
- Norm Dare (born 1948), Australian rules footballer
- Phyllis Dare (1890–1975), English singer and actress
- Reginald Dare (1921–1993), English cricketer and footballer
- Tessa Dare, American writer, a New York Times and USA Today bestselling historical romance novelist
- Virginia Dare (1587-?), first child born in the Americas to English parents
- Yinka Dare (1972–2004), Nigerian National Basketball Association player
- Zena Dare (1887–1975), English singer and actress; sister of Phyllis Dare
- Dan Dare (disambiguation), several fictional characters

== See also ==
- Dear (surname)
- Deer (surname)
- Deere
