= Darr (surname) =

Darr is an English or German surname. As an English surname, it is perhaps a variant of Dear. As a German surname, it is a variant of Därr (Daerr). Notable people with the surname include:

- Adam Darr (1811–1866), German musician
- Alice Darr (1930–2024), American jazz musician and songwriter
- Ann Darr (née Lois Ann Russell; 1920–2007), American poet and educator
- Leonard Darr (c. 1554–1615), English politician
- Leslie Rogers Darr (1886–1967), American judge
- Lisa Darr (née Lisa Darr Grabemann; born 1963), American actress
- Mark Darr (born 1973), American politician
- Matt Darr (born 1992), American football player
- Mike Darr (1976–2002), American baseball outfielder
- Mike Darr (pitcher) (born 1956), American baseball pitcher
- Robert Darr (born 1951), American author
- Sally Darr (née Kaufman; 1923–2023), American chef
- Vondell Darr (1919–2012), American actress

== See also ==
- Darr H. Alkire (1903–1977), American military officer and pilot
- Frank Darr Jackson (1854–1938), American politician
- Michael Darr Barnes (born 1943), American lawyer and politician
- Darré
- Derr
