= Dear (surname) =

Dear is an English surname. It is related to dear, the term of endearment, and deer, the name of the animal. Notable people with the surname include:

- Alf Dear (1878–1906), Australian rules footballer
- Brian Dear (born 1943), English footballer
- Buddy Dear (1905–1989), American baseball player
- Calsher Dear (born 2005), Australian rules footballer
- Cleveland Dear (1888–1950), American politician
- Dave Dear (born 1946), British sprinter
- Geoffrey Dear, Baron Dear (born 1937), British crossbench peer and police officer
- Greg Dear (born 1963), Australian rules footballer
- I. C. B. Dear, British historian
- Jenna Dear (born 1996), English footballer
- Jeremy Dear (born 1966), British trade unionist and journalist
- Jim Dear (1910–1981), British sportsperson
- John Dear (born 1959), American priest and activist
- John P. Dear, British academic and educator
- Lilya Pavlovic-Dear (born 1947), French-American artist
- Matthew Dear (born 1979), American music producer
- Michael Dear, Welsh geographer and educator
- Miranda Dear, Australian film producer
- Nick Dear (born 1955), British screenwriter
- Noach Dear (1953–2020), American politician and judge
- Paul Dear (1966–2022), Australian rules footballer
- Terry Dear (1913–1995), Australian radio personality
- William Dear (born 1943), Canadian actor and filmmaker
- William Dear (detective) (1937–2024), American private investigator

== Fictional ==
- Doris Dear, actress, comedian, and singer created by Ray DeForest

== See also ==
- Audrey Dear Hesson (born 1929), Canadian artist
- Dare (name)
- Darr (surname)
- Dearing
- Deer (surname)
- Deere
