= Hilda Dajč =

Yugoslav-Jewish diarist and Holocaust victim (1922–1942)

- Hilda Dajč in an undated pre-war photograph
- Born: 22 March 1922; Vienna, Austria
- Died: Spring 1942 (aged 19–20) near Belgrade, German-occupied Serbia
- Other name: Hilda Deitch
- Education: University of Belgrade Faculty of Architecture
- Occupations: Student; volunteer nurse
- Known for: Letters written from the Sajmište concentration camp

Hilda Dajč (Note: According to Nevena Daković, Dajč is the Serbian rendering of the Jewish surname "Deitch"; Menachem Shelach instead uses the German form "Deutsch".) (Serbian: Хилда Дајч, pronounced [xîlda dâjt͡ʃ]; also Hilda Deitch; 22 March 1922 – 1942) was a Yugoslav Jewish student and Holocaust victim. Her letters from the Sajmište concentration camp are effectively the only surviving documents written by Jewish prisoners held there, and represent one of the few surviving first-person accounts from German-occupied Serbia during the Holocaust.

Born in Vienna and raised in Belgrade, Dajč studied architecture at the University of Belgrade. Following Nazi Germany's invasion of Yugoslavia and occupation of Serbia in 1941, she volunteered as a nurse at the Jewish Hospital in Belgrade and, in December 1941, chose to enter the Sajmište concentration camp to provide medical assistance to the prisoners. Between December 1941 and February 1942, Dajč wrote four letters to two schoolmates: the first on the eve of her internment, and three more smuggled out of the camp, describing the hunger, overcrowding, and disease endured by the prisoners. Her father was killed at the camp in February 1942; that spring, she was murdered in a gas van, as were her mother and brother, when German authorities exterminated the camp's remaining Jewish prisoners.

Dajč's letters, now held by the Jewish Historical Museum in Belgrade and the Historical Archives of Belgrade, were first published in 2005. She has sometimes been called a "Serbian Anne Frank" and her letters likened to Frank's diary. She has since been commemorated in Serbia through Stolpersteine memorial stones outside her family's former home, three films, a graphic novel, and an award established in her name.

== Early life and education ==
Hilda Dajč was born on 22 March 1922 in Vienna into an Ashkenazi Jewish family, the daughter of Augusta and Emil Dajč, an engineer; (Note: Almuli describes Emil Dajč as a merchant (trgovac) rather than an engineer.) she had a younger brother, Hans, born in 1924. She was raised in Belgrade, then part of the Kingdom of Yugoslavia, where she completed her secondary education at the State Third Girls' Gymnasium and later enrolled to study architecture at the University of Belgrade. Her studies were interrupted in April 1941 by Nazi Germany's invasion of Yugoslavia, during which Belgrade was subjected to heavy aerial bombardment; the Germans then established the Territory of the Military Commander in Serbia.

During the early months of the occupation, she began volunteering at the Jewish Hospital in Belgrade, which had been created after the German authorities barred Jews from using city hospitals or receiving treatment from non-Jews. The Jewish community was responsible for equipping and maintaining the hospital, where Jewish doctors and nurses worked without pay. Her father had previously served as vice-president of the Jewish Community of Belgrade, the representative body of the city's Jewish population, then, from April 1941, as vice-president and later president of the Vertretung der jüdischen Gemeinde, a Jewish representative body established by the German occupation authorities that replaced the Belgrade Jewish community council.

== Persecution and imprisonment ==
On 30 May 1941, the Military Commander in Serbia issued the Verordnung betreffend die Juden und Zigeuner ('Decree on Jews and Gypsies'), requiring Belgrade's Jews to register with the authorities. Over the following weeks, Jewish men aged 14 to 60 and women aged 16 to 60 were conscripted for forced labour, made to wear yellow armbands marking them as Jewish, and barred from the city's trams, theatres, and cinemas. Their property was also seized through punitive levies and forced Aryanisation. Within two months of the invasion, the occupation had stripped Serbia's Jews of their legal standing and property. Following the uprising that began in the Serbian countryside that summer and culminated in the Partisans' capture of Užice in September, occupation authorities adopted a policy of reprisal executions targeting Jewish men and Romani people. Around 5,000 Jewish men were shot between September and December 1941 alone; by the year's end, most of Serbia's Jewish men were dead. Harald Turner, chief of staff of the German Military Administration in occupied Serbia, then shifted his attention to the women and children who remained, arranging their internment.

=== Sajmište (Judenlager Semlin) ===
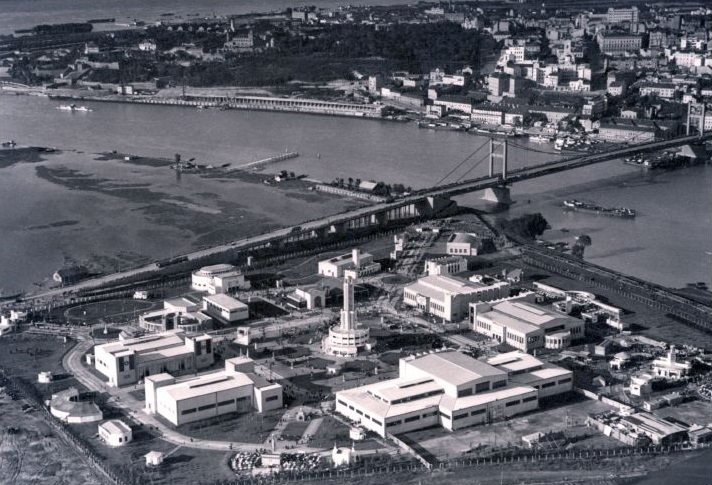
The Belgrade fairgrounds, photographed in 1937, before its conversion into the Sajmište concentration camp.

On 8 December 1941, the surviving 7,000 Jewish women and children in Belgrade, along with others from across occupied Serbia, were ordered to report to the police to be transferred to the former Belgrade Fairgrounds across the Sava River, near the town of Zemun (Semlin in German). There, German authorities established a camp that they called Judenlager Semlin ('Jewish Camp Semlin') and that Yugoslavs called Sajmište (Serbo-Croatian for 'fairground'), using the pavilions of the pre-war exhibition complex to confine the remaining Jewish population, along with nearly 300 Romani women and children. (Note: In total, 292 Romani women and children were also detained at Sajmište. An order issued by the Military Commander in Serbia on 11 July 1941 allowed them to be removed from the official register of "Gypsies" and reclassified as Serbs. They were released before the murder of the Jewish prisoners began; Jews received no equivalent exemption.)

The camp fell under the Sicherheitspolizei and SD office in Belgrade. From late January 1942, the camp was commanded by SS-Untersturmführer Herbert Andorfer, with external guards drawn from a police reserve battalion. It was located less than 5 km (3.1 mi) from central Belgrade but formally lay within the territory of the Independent State of Croatia. Between December 1941 and March 1942, around 7,000 Jewish prisoners were interned there, roughly half of German-occupied Serbia's Jewish population before the war; in the spring of 1942, nearly all of them were murdered in a gas van.

Her father's role in the German-established Vertretung der jüdischen Gemeinde initially protected the family from some anti-Jewish measures in occupied Serbia. After completing a medical course that year, Dajč chose to enter the camp voluntarily to serve as a nurse in early December 1941, against her family's wishes. On 8 December, the day Belgrade's Jewish women and children had been ordered to report, she went to the offices of the Judenreferat, the German security police's Jewish affairs section, and was transported by truck to the Sajmište concentration camp.

She was held in Pavilion No. 3 at the newly established camp, which stood directly across the Sava River from the city; conditions there were severe, with widespread starvation, disease, and frequent deaths among the inmates. Prisoners slept on wooden scaffolding installed inside the pavilions, with no heating, few toilets, and only one shower room for the entire camp. During the winter of 1941–42, an average of around one hundred prisoners at Sajmište died each day from exposure. Contemporary testimony describes prisoners crossing the frozen river to bury the dead in the Jewish cemetery. The camp's hospital was later housed in the Spasić Pavilion, where Dajč worked alongside Dr Moša Alakalaj. By the end of 1941, Emil Dajč, who had by then become president of the Vertretung, was himself interned at Sajmište, where he served as representative of the camp inmates and an administrator. On 31 January 1942, he took part in a meeting with Milan Marković, chief of the Belgrade city administration's welfare section, and Weinstein, the camp's Jewish administrator, to confirm invoices for food supplied to the camp between 26 December 1941 and 21 January 1942. Her mother and younger brother Hans were interned at the camp as well.

== Letters ==
Dajč wrote four letters, the last three while imprisoned, to two schoolmates: Nada Novak (b. 1920), a former president of their school's Aleksa Šantić literary society, who was the daughter of the academic Viktor Novak, and later became a Slavist, and Mirjana Petrović (b. 1920), later Mirjana Kašanin, a lawyer and translator. Dajč herself succeeded Novak as the society's president in her final year at the State Third Girls' Gymnasium in Belgrade. Written between December 1941 and February 1942 in Serbian Cyrillic script, the letters provide a rare first-person account of life in the camp, describing severe overcrowding, hunger, and isolation among the prisoners. According to the historian Magdalena Saiger, they were probably smuggled out by staff from the Jewish Hospital who regularly entered the camp. The Holocaust researcher Jaša Almuli reports that the first internee executed was a courier named Heslajn, who had been carrying letters between the camp and the Jewish Hospital; five women and girls were shot for the same reason in mid-February 1942.

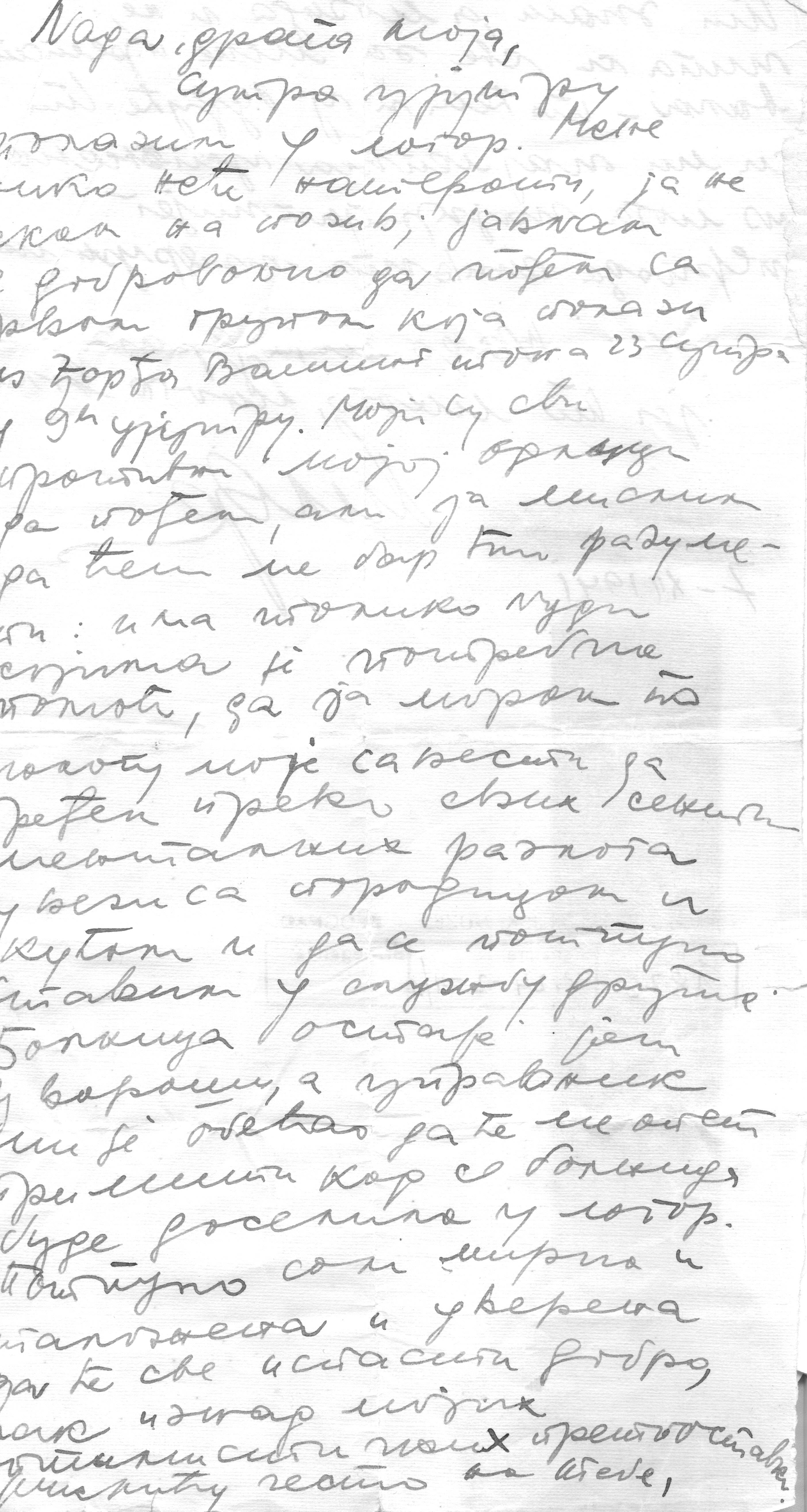
A page from Dajč's first letter, addressed to Nada Novak, 7 December 1941.

The first letter, dated 7 December 1941 and addressed to Novak, was written the night before Dajč's departure to the camp. In it, Dajč explains her decision to enter the camp as an act of conscience and duty, writing that "there are so many people in need of help that my conscience dictates to me that I should ignore any sentimental reasons regarding family and home, and place myself completely at the service of others". She also expresses optimism about the assistance she hoped to provide, and refers to her friends from the literary society, writing: "I will think of you often. You are my most beautiful memory from the most pleasant period of my life, the literary society."

Written on 9 December 1941 and addressed to Petrović, the second letter opens with her first impressions of the camp:

I'm writing to you from the idyllic surroundings of a cowshed, lying on straw, while above me, instead of the starry sky, stretches the wooden roof construction of Pavilion No. 3.

She goes on to portray the overcrowded pavilions, where prisoners slept on wooden galleries with only about 80 centimetres (30 in) of personal space each, likening the camp to an "ant heap" filled with thousands of inmates. She writes about the harsh living conditions, including freezing winter temperatures, insufficient food and water, constant roll calls, and the presence of barbed wire surrounding the pavilions. The letter also reflects her efforts to maintain intellectual and emotional resilience; she mentions that reading Heine helped her cope, despite a latrine half a kilometre (0.3 mi) away shared by fifteen people at a time. She also recounts beginning work in the camp infirmary, a makeshift clinic consisting of a table with a few bottles and gauze, assisting a doctor and pharmacist in treating prisoners.

In a third letter to Novak, written on 11 December 1941, Dajč turned to the camp's deteriorating conditions and the daily routines of imprisonment. (Note: Giergiel's account of the letter suggests a date of around 13 December.) Dajč writes about severe overcrowding, long queues, and the constant noise produced by thousands of inmates confined in the pavilions. She also recounts treating prisoners for lice infestation, at one point burning her arms with the disinfectant cresol, and reports that camp authorities had removed a group of boys and sick adults from the pavilion without explanation. During one of the hospital courier's daily visits, her brother Hans came and told her that their parents would arrive at the camp the following day. Dajč continued to cultivate an intellectual life, referring with irony to a small personal "library" she had brought with her, consisting of Goethe's The Sorrows of Young Werther, along with works by Heine, Blaise Pascal, and Michel de Montaigne, as well as English and Hebrew textbooks. The letter is still largely optimistic: Dajč notes that she remained calm and continued working long hours in the camp infirmary, expressing the belief that her efforts would give meaning to her decision to volunteer for the camp.

By the time she wrote her final surviving letter, on 7 February 1942, again to Petrović, the desperation of several weeks' imprisonment had set in. In it, Dajč describes the effects of severe hunger, cold, and exhaustion on the prisoners, and the growing sense of isolation.

We are so near the world, yet so far from everyone. We have no contact with anyone; the life of every individual out there goes on just the same, as if a slaughterhouse of six thousand innocents weren't operating half a kilometre away. We are all equal in our cowardice, both you and we. Enough.

Близу смо света, а тако удаљени од свих. Ни са ким немамо везе, живот сваког појединца напоље тече исто тако даље, као да се пола километра даље не одиграва кланица шест хиљада невиних. Сви смо једнаки по своме кукавичлуку и ви и ми. Доста.

— Fourth letter, to Mirjana Petrović, 7 February 1942

Saiger observes the growing separation between the prisoners and the outside world, as Dajč fears that her relationships with those outside the camp will be broken. She refers to herself as a логорка ('camp inmate'), reflecting the psychological transformation brought about by life in the camp. At the same time, she describes helping to lay out the bodies of 27 prisoners who had died in the camp's former Turkish pavilion. The letter also registers the uncertainty surrounding the prisoners' fate, as Dajč wonders whether they might be shot, deported, or otherwise killed. It retains a deeply personal tone, expressing Dajč's longing for her friends and the outside world, which she calls a lost paradise.

According to later recollections by Petrović, the two friends were able to arrange brief meetings on several occasions when prisoners were allowed to cross the frozen Sava River to meet staff from the Jewish Hospital on the opposite bank. Petrović recalled that during one such occasion Dajč escorted sick prisoners to the Jewish Hospital in Dorćol and briefly met her at a tavern near the harbour, where the letters were handed over. In an account she later shared with Almuli, Petrović described how Dajč's appearance had markedly deteriorated by then, showing visible signs of exhaustion and despair. Saiger notes that the signatures of the letters reflect a shift in tone, from "Hilda" or "your Hilda" in the early letters to the ironic description "happy volunteer" and finally to "your camp inmate" in the final letter.

== Death ==
Dajč petitioned the camp authorities for her release, citing her voluntary entry, but to no avail. In the spring of 1942, she was among the Jewish prisoners killed in the gas van used by the German authorities to murder the remaining inmates of Sajmište. The historian Christopher Browning argues that by early 1942, Nazi leadership had already decided on the Final Solution but lacked the means to carry it out everywhere. Occupation authorities in Belgrade, who had been pressing for the deportation of Serbia's remaining Jewish women and children, lost that prospect once Reinhard Heydrich announced at the Wannsee Conference in January 1942 that deportations would proceed west to east. Heydrich instead supplied a mobile gas van so that local authorities could carry out the killing themselves.

The van reached the camp in early March 1942. Prisoners were informed that they were being relocated and instructed to pack their belongings. A separate lorry carrying the luggage followed the gas van as far as the Sava River before delivering the prisoners' possessions to the depot of the National Socialist Volksfürsorge ('People's Welfare'). Initially a Jewish doctor or nurse accompanied each transport. In an April 1942 letter, Turner claimed to have personally requested the van from Berlin, describing it as an Entlausungswagen ('delousing truck') intended to clear the camp within weeks. The van operated daily except on Sundays, killing prisoners during the drive to the Jajinci execution site, south-east of Belgrade, where their bodies were buried. The final transport departed on 10 May 1942.

The vehicle, a Saurer van operated by two SS-Scharführer, Götz and Meyer, was used to kill nearly all those still detained at Sajmište. (Note: Estimates of the death toll vary: the historian Walter Manoschek cites the wartime official figure of approximately 7,500, noting that other contemporary estimates ranged as high as 8,000; Jürgen Matthäus puts the figure at close to 7,000; and the political scientist Jelena Subotić gives a lower figure of approximately 6,300.) Dajč's mother and younger brother, Hans, were also killed in the operation. Her father was murdered at the camp in February 1942. The same gas-van operation was used on 18–19 March 1942 to murder the patients and staff, around 700 people, of the Jewish Hospital in Belgrade, where Dajč had earlier worked as a nurse. In August 1942, Turner reported that "Serbia is the only country in Europe where the Jewish problem has been solved".

== Legacy and commemoration ==
Almuli located the letters' recipients in 1989 and interviewed them. He first published the letters in his anthology Jevrejke govore (2005; 'Jewish Women Speak'), then republished them alongside Novak's and Petrović's fuller accounts in Stradanje i spasavanje srpskih Jevreja (2010; 'The Suffering and Rescue of Serbian Jews'). English translations have since been made available online by the Semlin Judenlager research project and the United States Holocaust Memorial Museum.

The first three letters are held by the Jewish Historical Museum in Belgrade, one of them received by Almuli directly from Petrović and deposited there by him; the fourth is preserved in the Historical Archives of Belgrade. The United States Holocaust Memorial Museum has featured her correspondence in its documentation of the destruction of the Jewish community in German-occupied Serbia. Her letters are effectively the only surviving documents written by the camp's Jewish prisoners. Scholars and commentators have sometimes compared Dajč's correspondence to the diary of Anne Frank. Nevena Daković writes that she is occasionally referred to as a "Serbian Anne Frank", noting that her letters offer an intimate and personal account of persecution comparable in tone, though much shorter in form, to Frank's diary. In his book Jevrejke govore, Almuli wrote that her four letters, like Anne Frank's diary, offer a brief glimpse into their author's fate, calling them rare documents of the tragedy of an intelligent Jewish girl.

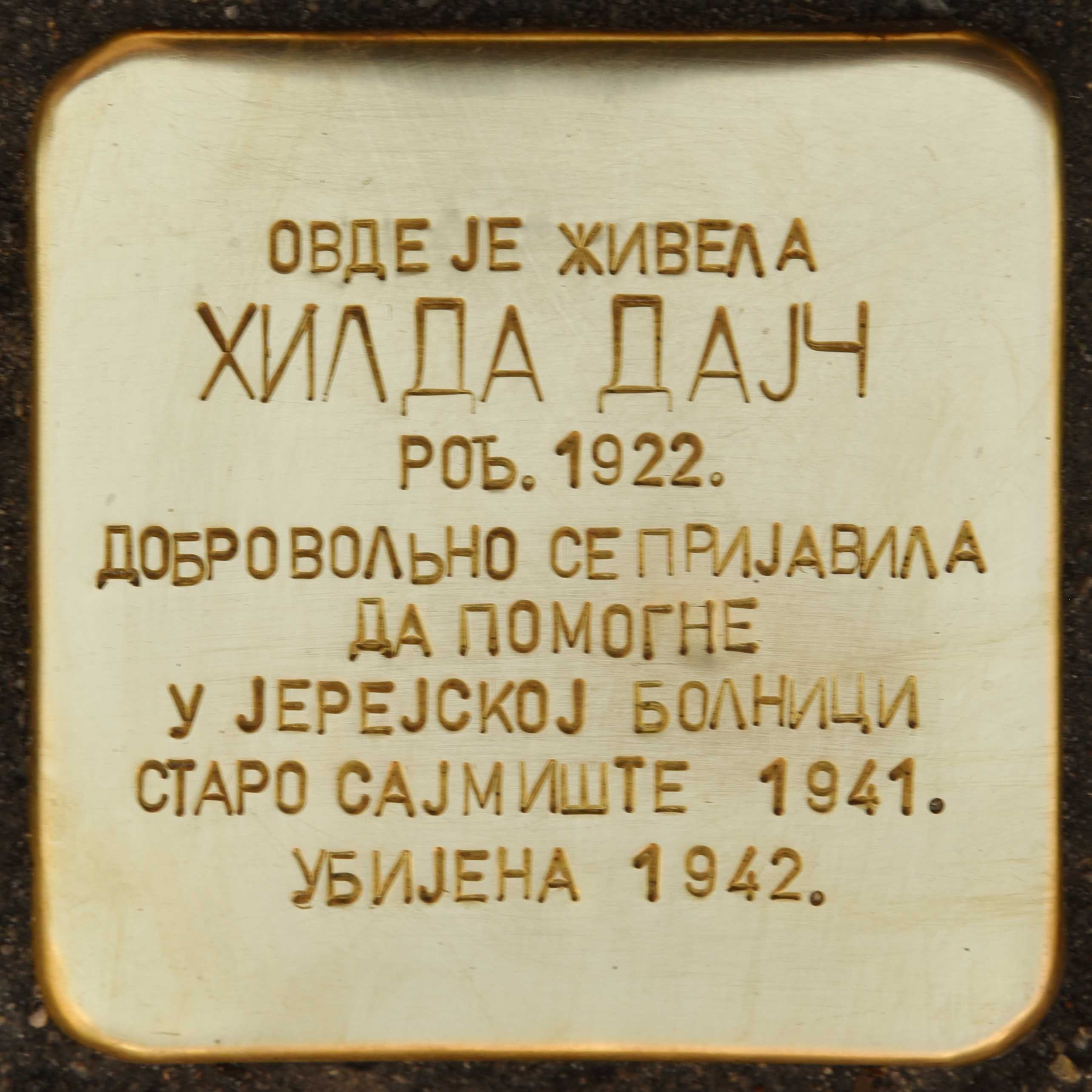
A memorial plaque in Belgrade marking the former residence of Hilda Dajč. It reads: "Here lived Hilda Dajč, born 1922. She volunteered to help at the Jewish Hospital. Staro Sajmište, 1941. Murdered 1942."

Dajč's story has since been retold on screen and in print. The first documentary, Ljudi govore: Hilda Dajč ('The People Speak: Hilda Dajč'), directed by Radoslav Ognjenović, aired on Radio Television of Serbia in March 1992; a second, 25-minute documentary, Pisma Hilde Dajč ('Letters from Hilda Dajč'), directed by Svetislav Vučković, followed in 2019. A third film, Peto pismo Hilde Dajč ('The Fifth Letter of Hilda Dajč'), premiered on International Holocaust Remembrance Day in 2023, blending archival Holocaust footage with reconstructed scenes narrated through excerpts from her letters. The Serbian artist Aleksandar Zograf has also depicted her letters and the experiences of Jewish prisoners at Sajmište in the graphic novel The Letters of Hilda Deitch, profiled in The Jerusalem Post in 2018. On 5 July 2022, the German artist Gunter Demnig laid Belgrade's first Stolpersteine ('stumbling stones') outside the Dajč family's former residence at 9 Maršala Birjuzova Street, four small brass-topped concrete blocks commemorating Emil, Augusta, Hilda, and Hans Dajč.

That same year, the Remembering Hilda Dajč Award was established in Serbia to mark the 80th anniversary of the murder of Jewish prisoners at the Sajmište concentration camp. It is presented annually in two categories: a youth award recognising young people's civic responsibility and social activism, and a separate award for outstanding contributions to Holocaust remembrance culture. Its trophy, designed by the Serbian artist Vojislav Klačar, is shaped as a bundle of four terracotta letters symbolising the four surviving letters written by Dajč. The award's scope has since expanded beyond Serbia: in May 2026, the Serbian NGO Terraforming and the University of Sussex's Landecker Digital Memory Lab announced a new international companion award, the Hilda Dajč International Digital Holocaust Memory Award, recognising innovation in the digital memorialisation of the Holocaust.

== See also ==
- History of the Jews in Serbia
- The Holocaust in German-occupied Serbia
