= Deer (surname) =

Deer is an English surname. Notable people with the surname include:

- A. Brian Deer (1945–2019), American-Canadian librarian
- Aaron Deer (born 1980), American songwriter and multi-instrumentalist
- Ada Deer (1935–2023), Native American leader
- Andrew Deer, English taekwondo athlete
- Beatrice Deer (born 1982), Canadian singer-songwriter
- Brian Deer, 20th-21st century British investigative reporter
- Dennis Deer (1972–2024), American politician
- Gary Mule Deer (born 1939), American comedian
- Gene Deer (1964—2024), American blues guitarist
- George Deer (1890–1974), British politician
- Jaime Deer, American police officer
- James Young Deer (1876–1946), Native American film actor
- Olive Deer (1897–1983), British politician
- Peter Deer (1878–1956), Canadian track and field athlete
- Rob Deer (born 1960), American baseball player
- Sarah Deer (born 1972), American lawyer
- Tracey Deer (born 1978), Canadian-Mohawk screenwriter

== See also ==
- Dare (name)
- Dear (surname)
- Deere
