= Joseph Dare =

Joseph Dare may refer to:

- Joseph Dare (footballer) (born 1991), Australian rules footballer
- Joseph Dare (minister) (1831–1880), Australian Wesleyan Church leader
