= Jaša Almuli =

Serbian Holocaust researcher (1918–2013)

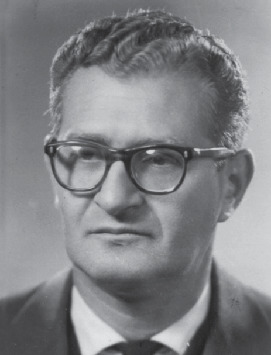
- Born: 25 August 1918; Bucharest, Romania
- Died: 26 September 2013 (aged 95)
- Occupations: Journalist; Holocaust researcher
- Known for: Holocaust survivor testimony documentation; president of the Jewish Community of Belgrade
- Notable work: Živi i mrtvi; Jevrejke govore; Jevreji i Srbi u Jasenovcu

Jaša Almuli (Serbian: Јаша Алмули; 25 August 1918 – 26 September 2013) was a Serbian Jewish journalist, author and Holocaust researcher. A Holocaust survivor and former member of the Yugoslav Partisans, he began his career at the Yugoslav news agency Tanjug and later held senior editorial and correspondent posts at Borba, serving as a foreign correspondent in Brazil, Washington and London. He was president of the Jewish Community of Belgrade from 1989 to 1992.

From the late 1980s, he played a leading role in the documentation of survivor testimony relating to the Holocaust in Serbia and the former Yugoslavia. He served as project director of the Belgrade affiliate of the Fortunoff Video Archive for Holocaust Testimonies and later as project coordinator for the United States Holocaust Memorial Museum's Former Yugoslavia Documentation Project. Between 1989 and 1997 he recorded and organised extensive collections of survivor interviews preserved in the archives of the Fortunoff Archive and the USHMM. His published works based on survivor testimony were described in scholarly reviews as well-documented contributions to the study of the Holocaust in Serbia and the Balkans.

In 1992 he settled permanently in London, where he continued his research and writing until his death in 2013.

== Early life and education ==
Almuli was born in Bucharest, Romania, on 25 August 1918 to a Serbian Sephardic family. His mother was at that time a refugee in Bucharest during the last stages of the First World War. His father, Isak-Žak Almuli, was a Belgrade merchant originally from Šabac and was sometimes known as Žarko. His mother was Sofija (née Cohen). The family traced its origins in Serbia to the sixteenth century, following the expulsion of the Jews from Spain. After the First World War, his mother served as vice-president of the Jewish Women’s Society.

Almuli completed primary school near the Cathedral Church in Belgrade and attended the Second Male Gymnasium in Belgrade. From 1936 to 1941, he studied technology at the Faculty of Technology in Belgrade.

As a secondary-school student, Almuli was active in the left-wing Zionist youth organisation Hashomer Hatzair, which he left at the age of sixteen. He became a member of the League of Communist Youth of Yugoslavia (SKOJ) in 1934 and joined the Communist Party of Yugoslavia (KPJ) in 1938. Before the Second World War, he was arrested for political activity and spent one month imprisoned in Belgrade's Glavnjača prison.

== Second World War ==
On 6 April 1941, following the German bombing of Belgrade, Almuli left the city with his sister Rašela, their cousin Mirko Davičo and several friends, travelling mostly on foot, via western Serbia and Sarajevo to the Bay of Kotor in Italian-occupied Montenegro. They stayed in Prčanj at a holiday resort for poor Jewish children that their mother had been running. His older brother Mončelo, a reserve cavalry lieutenant, was arrested and taken to a camp for prisoners of war in Osnabrück. In the autumn of 1941, Almuli's photograph was displayed at the Grand Anti-Masonic Exhibition, an antisemitic exhibition in Belgrade.

Almuli, Rašela and Davičo, who were members of the Communist Party of Yugoslavia, assisted in organising resistance activity. In July 1941 they were arrested by Italian authorities along with approximately 200 other Jews and transferred to a military camp near Kavajë in Albania. In early November they were moved to Bari and then by train to the Ferramonti di Tarsia internment camp in Calabria. Almuli later spent a period under free confinement in Mirandola near Modena, his cousin Mirko was found out as a prominent communist member and was handed over to the Ustaše.

As Italy's position collapsed in 1943, the authorities allowed Jewish refugees to leave and Almuli and his sister left by air for Spain. In Madrid they remained for one year, before moving to Haifa in British-mandate Palestine in a transport of about 7,000 Jewish refugees. He worked briefly in a chemical plant before transferring to Egypt, where he joined a tank brigade of the People's Liberation Army of Yugoslavia (NOVJ). With this unit he reached southern Italy and was sent to the island of Vis.

He served as a propagandist at the headquarters of the Second Dalmatian Brigade, a unit of the 2nd Proletarian Division, before joining the Eleventh Serbian Brigade. He was subsequently assigned to the Propaganda Department of the Supreme Headquarters of the NOV and POJ and later to the department responsible for liaison with foreign military missions.

== Journalism career ==
In September 1945, on the orders of Agitprop, Almuli was transferred to the Yugoslav news agency Tanjug, where he worked as assistant editor of the foreign affairs desk. He later headed the Foreign News Broadcast Service and subsequently the Domestic News Service. In 1946, he served as a special correspondent from the Paris Peace Conference. Two years later, he was accredited as a correspondent at the Danube River Conference of 1948.

From 1952 to 1956, Almuli was a Tanjug correspondent in Brazil and later worked at the information centre of the Yugoslav embassy. After returning from Brazil, he was a foreign-policy commentator for the newspaper Borba from 1956 to 1959. He was again posted to Brazil in 1959, reporting for both Tanjug and Borba, and returned to Belgrade in 1963, where he resumed leadership of Tanjug’s Foreign News Broadcast Service.

From 1967 to 1970, he served as Tanjug correspondent in Washington, D.C. Between 1970 and 1975, he was head of the Information Department of the International Investment Corporation of Yugoslavia in London. He continued working for the corporation in Belgrade until his retirement in 1978. After retirement, he worked as a freelance journalist, wrote for Ekonomska politika, provided economic commentary for Television Belgrade, and lectured at the Institute of Journalism in Belgrade.

== Jewish community leadership ==
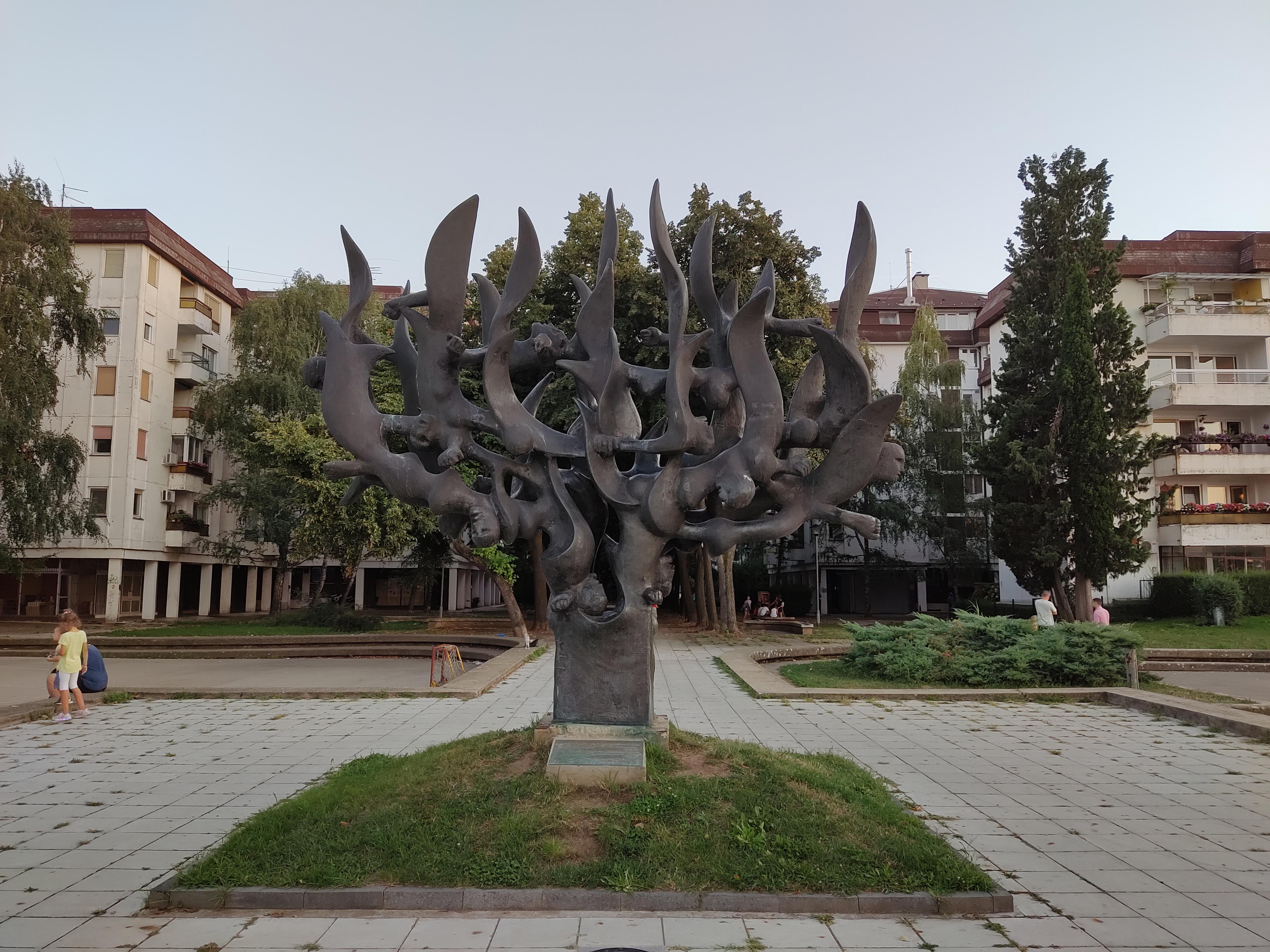
Menorah in Flames monument in Belgrade, unveiled in 1990 during Almuli's presidency of the Jewish Community of Belgrade.

In the early 1980s, Almuli became increasingly active in the Jewish community, serving as president of the Jewish Community of Belgrade from 1989 to 1992. In the 1989 elections for that office, he made the commemoration of Dorćol, the historic centre of Belgrade's pre-war Jewish community, and the preservation of Jewish memory central to his platform. He was also among the founders of the Crisis Headquarters of the Jewish Community of Belgrade and the Federation of Jewish Communities of Yugoslavia established in 1991.

During his tenure, restoration works were undertaken at the Belgrade Synagogue and the cemetery chapel. In 1990 the monument Menorah in Flames, dedicated to the victims of Nazism in Serbia, was erected on the Danube waterfront in Dorćol. The project, relaunched in the late 1980s by the Jewish Community of Belgrade with the support of a city-appointed committee, was unveiled on 21 October 1990 at a public ceremony at which Almuli, then president of the community, addressed those in attendance. He described the occasion for surviving Jews as "not one common disclosure of the monument, but the first dignified burial of dead Jews whose bodies were thrown into a nameless tomb".

== Holocaust documentation and scholarship ==
Following his retirement from journalism, Almuli devoted himself to documenting the Holocaust. After meeting Geoffrey Hartman at the 1988 "Remembering for the Future" conference in Oxford, he helped establish a Belgrade affiliate of the Fortunoff Video Archive for Holocaust Testimonies and was appointed project director. Between 1989 and 1992 he recorded 37 video testimonies; after a suspension caused by international sanctions, a further 41 were recorded between 1995 and 1997. Almuli conducted the overwhelming majority of these interviews himself and coordinated the identification of interviewees, local logistics and archival transfer.

Between 1989 and 1997 he recorded more than one hundred testimonies from Jewish survivors in Serbia and other parts of Yugoslavia, as well as approximately seventy from the Greek Jewish community, in projects supported by the Fortunoff Archive and the United States Holocaust Memorial Museum (USHMM). The documentary material includes accounts of arrests and executions in the Banjica concentration camp, as well as testimonies describing the indifferent collaborationist Nedić gendarmerie and threats from the Belgrade police. A 1996 newsletter of the Fortunoff Video Archive reported that he had completed 37 testimonies in Yugoslavia prior to the outbreak of war and a further 16 in Belgrade after the cessation of hostilities, and noted that he recorded 25 interviews in Thessaloniki in 1993 and 16 in Athens in 1994. This work also included interviews conducted in Corfu in 1996, some in Italian. After presenting his work at an oral history conference in Paris in 1994, he began conducting interviews for the USHMM's Oral History Department. In 1997 he was designated project coordinator for the USHMM's Former Yugoslavia Documentation Project and conducted a series of in-depth interviews in Belgrade with survivors of the Jasenovac concentration camp, later deposited in the Museum's archives.

Historian Jovan Byford notes that the Belgrade interviews were shaped both by the institutional frameworks of the American archives and by the political and historiographical context of Serbia in the late 1980s and 1990s, particularly debates concerning Jasenovac. He observes that Almuli approached the interviews primarily as juridical and historical testimony, emphasising factual reconstruction and documentation of crimes. Constance Pâris de Bollardière likewise notes that the Fortunoff Archive established an affiliate project in Belgrade under his direction and that he also oversaw interviews in Athens and Thessaloniki.

Almuli's interviews were later cited in scholarly studies of the Holocaust in Greece, while his 1989 Politika series and subsequent testimony projects were referenced in English-language scholarship on Yugoslav Jewry, including Voices of Yugoslav Jewry (1999) and the edited volume Bringing the Dark Past to Light.

In addition to his documentation work, Almuli participated in public and historiographical debates concerning the interpretation of the Holocaust in Serbia, particularly the role of the collaborationist government of Milan Nedić. In letters published in Patterns of Prejudice and other international periodicals in 1994, he argued that while Nedić’s administration collaborated with the German occupation authorities, the organisation and execution of the mass murder of Jews in occupied Serbia were undertaken by German authorities. He also described the destruction of Jews in Serbia and Greece as comparatively neglected in broader Holocaust historiography.

In the following years he remained publicly active, contributing to international discussions on wartime responsibility and historical interpretation. He continued documenting survivor testimony and writing on questions of Holocaust memory and historiography.

Almuli published the letters of Holocaust victim Hilda Dajč in his anthology Jevrejke govore (2005), bringing wider attention to her correspondence from the Sajmište concentration camp. The letters were later reproduced in his book Stradanje i spasavanje srpskih Jevreja (2010).

== Later life and death ==
In 1992, during the Bosnian War, Almuli returned permanently to London to be close to two of his children. He continued to serve as honorary president of the Belgrade Holocaust survivors' organisation.

Drawing on survivor testimonies and archival research, Almuli published several books on the persecution of Jews in Serbia and the former Yugoslavia, including Stradanje i spasavanje srpskih Jevreja (2010) (The Persecution and Rescue of Serbian Jews) and Ostali su živi (Those Who Survived) (2013). In reviews published in Balcanica and Soudobé dějiny, these works were characterised as well-documented and significant contributions to the study of the Holocaust in Serbia and the Balkans.

In 1999, he was interviewed by The Guardian during the NATO bombing of Serbia. In the article he questioned Western accounts of Serbian conduct in the conflict, described some allegations as NATO propaganda, and criticised Western portrayals of Serbia. The article also mentioned his longstanding liberal communist views.

Almuli died in London on 26 September 2013 from lung cancer, as announced by the Association of Journalists of Serbia (UNS). He had been a member of the association since 1949 and was recognised for his decades-long career in journalism, foreign correspondence and Holocaust documentation.

== Awards ==
Almuli was awarded the Yugoslav Order of Labour, First Class.

== Selected works ==
- Živi i mrtvi: razgovori sa Jevrejima [The Living and the Dead: Conversations with Jews]. S. Mašić. 2002. ISBN 978-86-7598-008-7.
- Jevrejke govore [Jewish Women Speak] (in Serbian). Signature. 2005. ISBN 978-86-83745-45-6.
- Jevreji i Srbi u Jasenovcu [Jews and Serbs in Jasenovac]. Službeni glasnik. 2009. ISBN 978-86-519-0251-5.
- Stradanje i spasavanje srpskih Jevreja [The Persecution and Rescue of Serbian Jews]. Zavod za udžbenike. 2010. ISBN 978-86-17-17048-4.
- Остали су живи / Ostali su živi [Those Who Survived] (in Serbian). Belgrade: Zavod za udžbenike. 2013. ISBN 978-86-17-18065-0. OCLC 862137684.

== Sources ==
- Hansen-Kokoruš, Renate; Terpitz, Olaf (11 October 2021). Jewish Literatures and Cultures in Southeastern Europe: Experiences, Positions, Memories. Böhlau Wien. ISBN 978-3-205-21289-8.
