= Belgrade Synagogue =

Synagogue in Belgrade, Serbia

- Београдска синагога Beogradska sinagoga
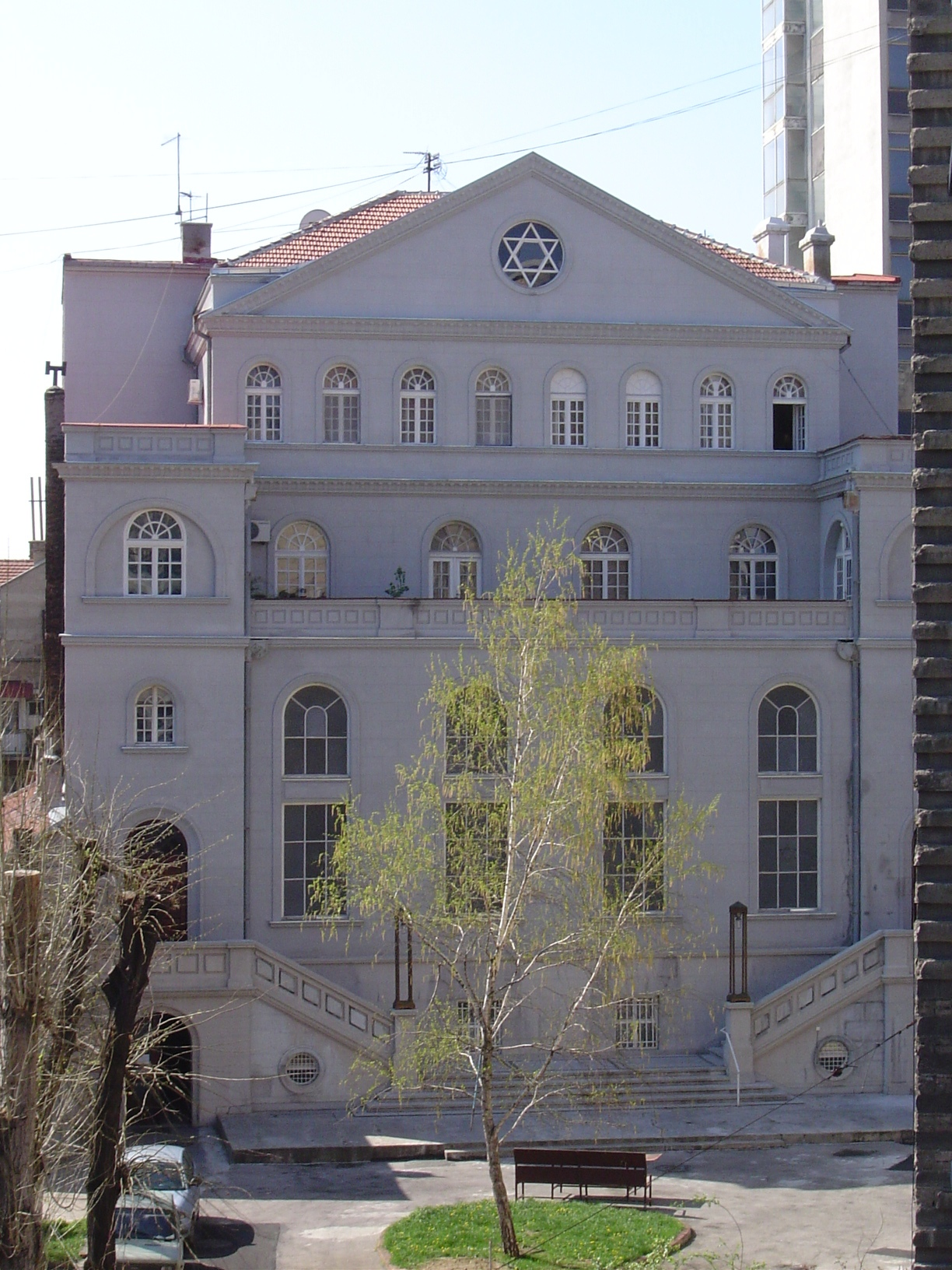
- Belgrade Synagogue, pictured in 2007

Religion
- Affiliation: Orthodox Judaism
- Rite: Nusach Ashkenaz
- Ecclesiastical or organisational status: Synagogue
- Status: Active

Location
- Location: Maršala Birjuzova 19, Belgrade
- Country: Serbia
- Interactive map of Belgrade Synagogue
- Coordinates: 44°48′55″N 20°27′26″E

Architecture
- Architects: Franjo Urban; Milan Šlan
- Type: Synagogue architecture
- Style: Neoclassical
- Established: 1869 (as a congregation)
- Groundbreaking: 1924
- Completed: 1929
- Materials: Brick

Website
- belgradesynagogue.com

Cultural Heritage of Serbia
- Official name: "Sukat Shalom" Synagogue in Belgrade
- Type: Immovable Cultural Property
- Criteria: Monument of Culture
- Designated: 31 May 2013
- Reference no.: SK 2117

The Belgrade Synagogue (Serbian: Београдска синагога, romanized: Beogradska sinagoga), officially the Sukkat Shalom Synagogue (Serbian: Синагога „Сукат Шалом”, romanized: Sinagoga „Sukat Šalom”), is an Orthodox Jewish congregation and synagogue, located in downtown Belgrade, Serbia.

The only functioning synagogue in the country, the Belgrade Synagogue was declared a national heritage site in 2013.

== History ==
The history of the Jews in Belgrade can be documented since the Ottoman conquest of Belgrade in 1521; not long afterwards, in the mid 1500s, Sephardic Jews began to settle in larger numbers: according to the census data for 1567 and 1573, there were several Jewish congregations and three synagogues. During the 17th century the Jewish community settles in the area near the Danube riverfront known as Jalije (from Turk. yalı, lit. “shore”). The life of the Jews began to improve after Serbia was set on the path to independence in the first half of the 19th century, and they were granted equal civil rights after the Congress of Berlin (1878).

The settlement of Ashkenazi Jews in Belgrade can be traced back to the 18th century, but the community considerably grew in the mid-19th and the first half of the 20th century. On 1 October 1869 a separate Ashkenazi community was founded and the “Rule of the Ashkenazi Jewish Congregation” (as the community in the making was called) was laid down in twenty articles, which, among other things, envisaged the founding of a school and a place of worship. Its approval by the city administration laid the formal groundwork for the new Ashkenazi community. At first the community rented a building in Kosmajska (present-day Maršala Birjuzova) Street for its religious, administrative, cultural and other needs. Fundraising to support the construction of a purpose-built, more functional building began on the eve of the First World War, but the cornerstone, with a charter on parchment signed by King Alexander and Queen Maria sealed within it, was solemnly laid only after the war, on 15 June 1924. The ceremony was attended by the envoys of the King and the government of the Kingdom of Serbs, Croats and Slovenes, the representatives of the Jewish congregations, of various corporations, the President of the National Assembly, and the Chief Rabbi Dr. Alcalay.

== Architecture ==
The construction plan was approved in 1923. Construction began on 15 May 1924 and lasted until 27 November 1929. The synagogue building, designed by the architect Franjo Urban assisted by Milan Šlang, was completed in 1926. In 1929 the interior was remodelled after the design of the architect Milutin Jovanović. It functioned as the place of worship for the Serbian-Jewish Congregation of the Ashkenazi rite until 1941.

In 1941–44, during the Nazi occupation of Belgrade, the building was desecrated and turned into a brothel. After the war it was restored to its original function as a synagogue for both congregations of Belgrade’s Jews.

The building was designed in the style of academism with predominant neo –Renaissance elements. In elevation it shows a semi-basement, the ground floor, the ground-floor gallery and two upper floors. The interior was designed to combine multiple functions in response to the Jewish community’s various needs: worship, education, office and dwelling spaces. This concept is based on the religious and social role of a synagogue, which needs to combine three basic functions: as a place of worship, a place of study and a place for community meetings. The semi-basement houses a kosher kitchen, a dining room and service rooms. The central ground-floor area with the gallery, being intended for ritual purposes, is preeminent both symbolically and religiously. At its side, separated by a wall, are offices, a study room and a meeting room. The two upper floors contain living quarters. The prayer space is partitioned with two rows of columns which support the gallery. The front façade is symmetrical and well-proportioned, with the decorative accent placed on the gable with David’s shield, a six-pointed star enclosed in an oculus. The central portion of the façade features four tall round-arched windows rising through the ground-floor and gallery levels.

The first-floor zone, separated from the lower by a shallow stringcourse, is set back, providing a parapeted terrace. It is fitted with four regularly spaced round-arched windows between which, according to the original blueprints of 1923, were ornamental medallions. The most simply articulated second-floor zone with its eight round-arched windows is separated from the first floor by a decorative stringcourse. In addition to these elements of the front elevation which lend an impression of well-balanced horizontality, verticality is accentuated by two protruding two-storey end bays topped with small towers lightened by arched openings on three sides. The towers, a clear allusion to a fortification and the character of Solomon's temple, are a frequently used motif in synagogue architecture, symbolising Jachin and Boaz, the pillars of Solomon's Temple. The gable above the second floor provides the final vertical accent. The wide central staircase of three flights, adorned with a simple balustrade and two lampposts, adds to the overall impression of the building’s dignified and ceremonial character. In terms of layout and style, the staircase is a reference to French neoclassicism, i.e. to the northern façade of the Petit Trianon at Versailles. The architectural and aesthetic articulation of elevations gives precedence to the front façade, which is harmonious and well-balanced. The decorative accent is on the gable, which features David’s star enclosed in an oculus.

Verticality it is accentuated by the tall round-arched windows in the zone of the ritual space of the synagogue, and by the projecting tower-topped end bays that flank the central portion of the façade. The prayer hall is the central and essential part of the synagogue. The elongated hekhal of the Sukat Shalom synagogue, encompassing the ground-floor and gallery levels, is orientated east to west and divided with two rows of eight-sided columns with ornamented capitals. The columns support the gallery, thus combining aesthetic, symbolic and structural functions. The coffered ceiling is decorated with a floral border. The holiest and most ornate element is the aron hakodesh against the east wall of the temple, which enshrines the Ashkenazi and Sephardic Torah scrolls and Hebrew Scriptures. It is flanked by two columns which differ from those in the hekhal only in being circular-sectioned. They carry a large marble cube which symbolises the Ark of the Covenant containing the Decalogue. These decorative architectural elements date from the period of post-World War II reconstruction of the desecrated and despoiled interior. In terms of disposition, the synagogue is a free-standing building in the rear of the lot, and therefore not fully visually graspable from the street. This disposition was determined primarily by the historic urban matrix of the district, characterised by an irregular street pattern and elongated lots.

== Jews in Belgrade ==
The Beth Israel Synagogue, built in 1908, destroyed in 1941

The first written records of the presence of Jews in Belgrade date back to the 16th century when the city was under Ottoman rule. At that time Belgrade boasted a strong Jewish Ladino-speaking Sephardic community mostly settled in the central Belgrade neighborhood called Dorćol. The city's Ashkenazi Jews, many of them from Central Europe and nearby Austria-Hungary, mostly lived near the Sava river in the area where the current active synagogue stands. The Jewish community in Belgrade flourished most notably in the 17th century when Belgrade had a yeshiva (a Jewish religious school), numerous community and cultural centers, Jewish charitable organizations, societies and shops. A beautiful early-20th century Sephardic synagogue, then one of the most prominent buildings in the city, stood in today's Cara Uroša Street (see image right) complete with ritual bathing quarters.

Before World War II some 12,000 Jews lived in Belgrade, 80% of whom were Spanish- or Ladino-speaking Sephardim, and 20% Yiddish-speaking Ashkenazim. Most of the Jewish population of Serbia was exterminated during the German occupation, and only 1,115 of Belgrade's twelve thousand Jews would survive. There were three concentration camps for Jews, Serbs and Gypsies in the city at the time. Most Jewish men perished at the Autokomanda site near the city center, apart from those killed at the Banjica camp; the camp at Sajmište was on Independent State of Croatia territory and it mostly saw the killing of women and children. Wartime bombing destroyed most of the Jewish monuments as well as much of the city. According to some reports, the current synagogue was used by the occupying forces as a brothel. The building was re-consecrated after the war.

Since 1944 there has only been a very small Jewish community in Serbia and Belgrade. Many of them emigrated to Israel after the war. Belgrade currently has a very active Jewish community center housing the Federation of Jewish Communities of Serbia and the Jewish Historical Museum. The city also has several commemorative monuments to Jewish suffering in past wars.

There are Sephardic and Ashkenazi Jewish cemeteries in Belgrade, but only the Sephardic one is in regular use today.

== See also ==
- List of synagogues in Serbia
- Religious architecture in Belgrade
- History of the Jews in Serbia
