= Lilya Pavlovic-Dear =

Franco-American artist (1947)

Lilya Pavlovic-Dear (born 1947) is a French-American painter, printmaker, photographer, and video artist. She has participated in more than 200 group shows and 60 solo shows.

== Life and education ==
Pavlovic-Dear was born on 30 May 1947 in Topola-Oplenac, Yugoslavia (now Serbia). In 1970 she graduated with a BA in Fresco, Painting and Mosaic at the Academy of Applied Arts in Belgrade. Obtaining a scholarship from the British Council, in 1973 she graduated as a Master of Fine Arts in Printmaking from Chelsea College of Arts, London. In 1974 she moved to Los Angeles where she exhibited and taught at UCLA from 1974 to 1977.

== Work ==
The main themes of Pavlovic-Dear's work are organic structures, maps of the world, Marco Polo on the Silk Road, angels, and water. Nature and ecology have always been present in her work and have oriented it for the last 50 years.

In the San Francisco Chronicle art critic Thomas Albright wrote of Pavlovic-Dear's work: "Imagine a cross between Dubuffet, Escher, and William T. Wiley. Lilya is a kind of landscapist of the inner psyche whose principal tools are an intricate, all-encompassing web-like structure and a fantastic quality of interior space." The art critic Pierre Rouve said of her show at Bradford University: "She portrays the unspoken and the unspeakable".

In 2007 Pavlovic-Dear published the book Marco Polo on the Silk Road, receiving the Grand European Prize Botticelli for it in 2008. In 2010 she published a retrospective book on her career entitled Lilya Pavlovic-Dear: Art Works 1970-2010.

Since 2019 Pavlovic-Dear has been a contributing expert to the Silk Sustainable Development Institution, a think tank based in Washington D.C..

== Personal life ==
Pavlovic-Dear married Richard Hamilton Bryarlie Dear Junior in 1975, and they have three daughters: Natasha, Katarina, and Alexandra. Pavlovic-Dear has been working and living between France and the United States since the 1980s.

== Exhibitions ==
Pavlovic-Dear has had exhibitions in the United States, Europe, and China. Important shows took place at the Library of Congress in Washington D.C; Fondazione Querini Stampalia, Venice, during the 56th Venice Biennale; Museum of Shanxi Province in Xi'an; and Museum of Modern Art in Madrid. She is featured in multiple public and private collections, including Los Angeles County Museum, U.S.A; Bibliothèque Nationale de France in Paris, France; Neue Galerie, Graz, Austria; and Museum of Art of Shanxi province in Xi'an, China.

Other exhibitions include:

- Bradford University, England, 1973
- Premi Internationale de Dessin Joan Miró, Barcelona, 1973–75, 1981
- Ljubljana International Graphic Arts Biennial, 1977
- International Biennial of Young Artists from New York, 1977
- Washington International Art Fair, 1977
- Frederick Wight Gallery, Los Angeles, 1977
- Salon d'Automne, Grand Palais, Paris, 1980, 1986
- Salon de Mai, Grand Palais, Paris, 1981, 1987, 1989
- Museum of Modern Art, Madrid, 1981
- Art and Architecture, UNESCO, Paris, 1988
- International Mini Print Exhibition, Cadaqués, 1982–99
- Salon Comparaisons, Grand Palais, Paris, 1988–98
- Dix Ans d'Acquisitions, Bibliothèque Nationale de France, 1991
- Salon Figuration Critique, Paris, 1996–98
- SAGA, Paris, 1997
- Triennale Mondiale d'Estampes Petit Format, Chamalières, 1997, 2000
- UNESCO Museum, Beirut, 2000
- Caelum Gallery, New York, 2004
- IPCNY, New York, 2005
- N.A.W.A Gallery, New York, 2009
- Salon Capital / Comparisons, Paris, 2010
- AUP Gallery, Paris, 2010
- Royal Geographical Society, London, 2010
- Fondation Paul Ricard, Île de Bendor (France), 2011
- Parish Gallery, Washington D.C., 2011
- Fondation Taylor, Paris, 2011
- European Council of Europe, Strasbourg, 2013
- Museum of Art of Shanxi province, Xi'An, 2014
- Exposure Award at Louvre Museum, Paris, 2015
- Fondazione Querini Stampalia, Venice, 2015
- UNESCO, Venice, 2017

== Main collections ==
Pavlovic-Dear's work is represented in the following collections:

- Los Angeles County Museum, Los Angeles
- Museum of Modern Art, Madrid
- Dix Ans d'Acquisitions, Bibliothèque Nationale de France, Paris
- Musée Minerve, Yzeures
- Jewish Historical Museum, Belgrade
- Historical Museum of Serbia, Belgrade
- Musée d'Arts décoratifs, Belgrade
- Neue Galerie, Graz
- National Museum of Kraljevo, Kraljevo
- National Museum of Šumadija, Kragujevac
- New York Public Library, New York
- Art Bank, Washington D.C.

Pavlovic-Dear is also listed in le Dictionnaire d'Art Bénézit, la Cotation d'Art Drouot, and Dictionnaire d'Art Akoun.

== Awards and honors ==
Pavlovic-Dear has received the following awards and honors:

- Chevalier Artistique, Accademia Internacionale Greci Marino, Italy, 1998
- Silver Medal, Arts Category, Mérite et Dévouement Français, 1988
- Médaille d'Argent dans la catégorie des Arts, Le Mérite et Dévouement Français, 1998
- European Arts Prize, Léopold Senghor, 2007
- Grand European Prize Botticelli 2008, for her art book Marco Polo on the Silk Road
- Golden Medal for the work "Ancient China in the Eyes of Artists", Guiyang Confucius Academy, China, 2017
