= Isaac Alcalay =

Bulgarian rabbi (1881–1978)

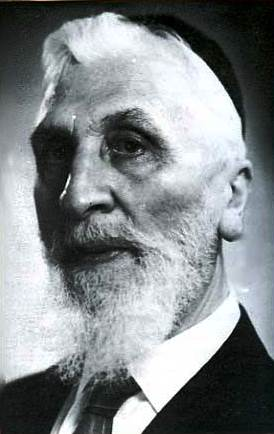
- Born: November 11, 1881; Sofia, Bulgaria
- Died: December 29, 1978 (aged 97); Brooklyn, New York, United States
- Citizenship: Bulgaria Yugoslavia United States
- Education: University of Vienna
- Occupations: Rabbi Chaplain; Government emissary Senator of Yugoslavia; Researcher Scholar
- Organization(s): Rabbinical Federation of Yugoslavia Central Sephardic Jewish Community of America; World Jewish Congress; American Jewish Joint Distribution Committee; B'nai B'rith New York Board of Rabbis
- Title: Chief Rabbi of Belgrade and Serbia; President of the Yugoslavian Red Cross
- Honours: Order of St. Sava

Isaac Abraham Alcalay (November 11, 1881 – December 29, 1978) was a Bulgarian-born Jew who served as Chief Rabbi of Serbia and Yugoslavia as well as a leader of American Sephardic Jews.

== Life ==
Alcalay was born on November 11, 1881 in Sofia, Bulgaria, the son of Rabbi Abraham Alcalay and Rifka Arditti.

Alcalay studied in the Vienna rabbinical seminary and graduated from the University of Vienna in 1908. In 1909, he was appointed Chief Rabbi of Belgrade and of Serbia. He served as an emissary of the Serbian government from 1915 to 1918, visiting America on a mission in 1918 on behalf of Serbian Jews and writing about the Serbian Jews in the American Jewish Year Book. He founded the Rabbinical Federation of Yugoslavia in 1923, serving as its first president and helping edit its annual Jevrejski Almanah. In 1923, King Alexander I appointed him Chief Rabbi of Yugoslavia. He attended the first Sephardi Congress in 1925, where he was elected vice-president of the World Sephardi Federation. In the years prior to the Holocaust, he was a central and unifying figure for Yugoslav Jewry. In 1928, he published a study of Jews through the Balkans in the late 19th century and the early 20th century. He received the Order of St. Sava in 1921. In 1932, King Alexander I appointed him to the Senate of Yugoslavia, making him the only Jewish member of the Parliament of Yugoslavia. He wasn't reappointed in 1938, when antisemitic sentiments were rising in Yugoslavia due to funding from Nazi Germany, leaving Yugoslavian Jews without any representation in the Parliament. He was a chaplain in the Serbian Army during the Balkan Wars and at one point president of the Yugoslavian Red Cross. He also wrote several research studies on the history of Jews in Serbia.

In April 1941, the day after the Germans bombed Belgrade, Alcalay left Belgrade with his wife and daughter and began escaping Yugoslavia on foot. There were false reports at first that he was killed in the bombings, although his son-in-law was reportedly captured by the Nazis. He was hunted down by the Gestapo in Yugoslavia, and at one point he hid in a cellar while his daughter told Gestapo agents that no one was in the house. The Breslau Radio repeatedly singled him out for attack, promising listeners he would be captured. He managed to escape capture and made his way to Sofia, Bulgaria, only for the pro-Nazi Bulgarian government under King Boris III to find out about his arrival and order him to leave within 24 hours. He was able to stay longer for health reasons and later made his way to Istanbul, Turkey. From there, he made his way to the Land of Israel, where he was welcomed by the entire Yishuv for his support of Zionism and for being the great-nephew of Rabbi Yehudah Hay Alcalay, a famous rabbi that preached political Zionism decades before Theodor Herzl. While in Palestine, he recovered from his journey and made arrangements with Jewish Agency leaders, especially heads of the Sephardic community, to render aid to Yugoslavia. He then travelled to America in a roundabout journey via West Africa and South America, arriving in the country by July 1942.

After arriving in America, Alcalay settled in New York City and became a representative of the Yugoslav government-in-exile. In 1945, he helped organize the Central Sephardic Jewish Community of America, Inc., serving as its leader, chief rabbi of all Sephardic Jews in New York City, and spiritual head of all Sephardic communities in the United States. Until his leadership, the Sephardic community in America went from some scattered and stagnating congregations into a more unified and mainstream community. Involved in the founding of the World Jewish Congress in 1936, he promoted its work on behalf of persecuted European Jewry before, during, and after World War II and the Holocaust. He was a board member of the American Jewish Joint Distribution Committee, B'nai B'rith, and the New York Board of Rabbis. He also founded the Sephardic Home for the Aged in Brooklyn. He retired as Chief Rabbi in 1968, after which he lived in the Sephardic Home. In 1970, Yeshiva University gave him a medal. In 1971, the Association of Yugoslav Jews in the U.S. issued a souvenir journal in honor of his 90th birthday.

In 1910, Alcalay married Jelena (Ilona) Schaeffer in Vienna. They had one daughter, Naumi, who established the Chief Rabbi Dr. Isaac Abraham and Jelena Alcalay Chair in Sephardic Studies at Yeshiva University's Bernard Revel Graduate School of Jewish Studies in 2009.

Alcalay died in the Sephardic Home on December 29, 1978.
