= Deere =

Deere is an English surname. It is a variant spelling of Dear. This name has two possible origins; the first is derived from the Middle English (1200–1500) personal name "Dere," from the Old English pre-7th-century "Deora," meaning beloved and used as a byname.

Notable people with the name include:

- Alan Deere (1917–1995), New Zealand flying ace
- Carmen Diana Deere (born 1945), American feminist economist
- Debbie Deere (born 1964), American politician
- Jack Deere, American charismatic pastor and theologian
- Jason Deere (born 1968), American singer-songwriter
- Jim Deere (born 1967), American football player and coach
- Joe Deere, Cherokee Nation politician
- John Deere (inventor) (1804–1886), American blacksmith and manufacturer
- Judd Deere (born 1987), American political advisor
- Steve Deere (born 1948), English footballer

== See also ==
- Dare (name)
- Dear (surname)
- Deer (surname)
