= Jewish Hospital in Belgrade =

Jewish hospital in German-occupied Belgrade during World War II

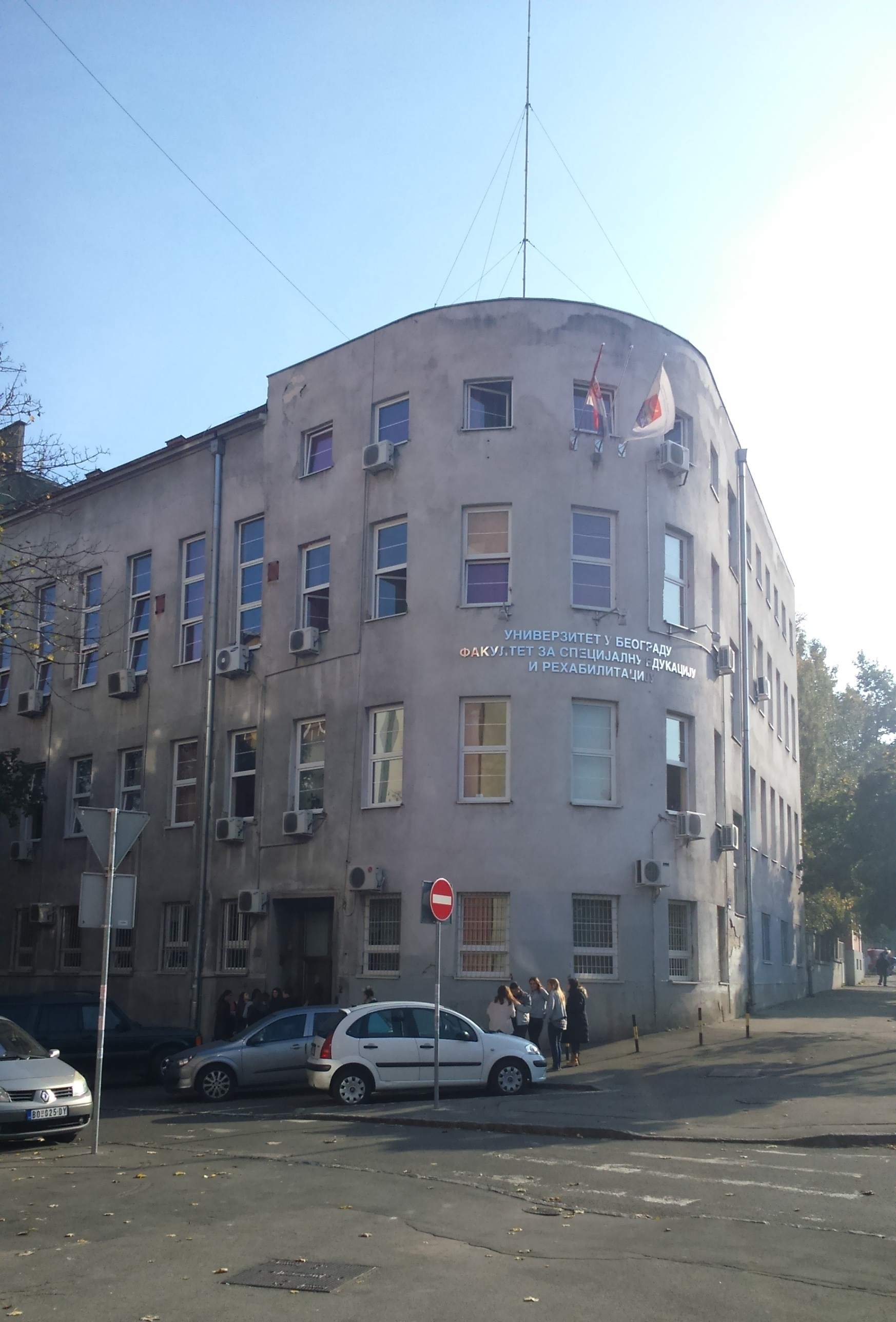
- Building of the former Jewish Hospital in Belgrade (now the Faculty of Special Education and Rehabilitation)

Geography
- Location: Stevana Visokog Street 2, Belgrade, German-occupied Serbia
- Coordinates: 44°49′53″N 20°28′01″E

Organisation
- Type: Specialist
- Religious affiliation: Judaism

History
- Opened: Mid 1941
- Closed: March 1942

The Jewish Hospital in Belgrade was a medical facility established in mid-1941 during the German occupation of Serbia in the Second World War. Located in the building of the Jewish Women's Society, it served the city's Jewish population after Jewish doctors and other medical staff were banned from public health institutions. By the end of March 1942 the hospital's patients and staff had been murdered by German authorities using a mobile gas van.

== History ==
Following the German occupation of Serbia in 1941, Jewish doctors and other medical personnel were dismissed from public health institutions. A Jewish hospital was therefore established in the building of the Jewish Women's Society to serve the city's Jewish population. The building, located at Stevana Visokog Street 2 in the Dorćol district, had been constructed in 1938 for the Jewish Women's Society and before the war housed a kindergarten, a dispensary for mothers and children and a shelter.

The Jewish hospital in Belgrade was founded in June or July 1941 by order of the Jewish Police.

The persecution and destruction of the Jewish population in German-occupied Serbia unfolded in two phases. Between July and November 1941 most Jewish men were executed by regular German army units in reprisal shootings carried out in response to resistance activity. In the following months Jewish women, children and the elderly were interned in the Sajmište concentration camp (Judenlager Semlin) near Belgrade, where most were killed between March and May 1942 using a mobile gas van.

== Destruction of the hospital ==
On the night of 19 March 1942, as part of the final phase of the destruction of the city's Jewish community, German authorities arrested the doctors and nurses of the Jewish hospital in their homes and brought them to the hospital building on Veliki Stevan Street. At the same time Jewish patients from a small infirmary in the Oneg Shabbat building on Kosmajska Street were transferred there. Around 700 people were held inside the hospital following these arrests.

Later that day a mobile gas van arrived and the detainees were forced into the vehicle. Contemporary witnesses reported that many of the victims were seriously ill, blind or physically disabled and had to be carried or loaded on stretchers. The van transported the victims to burial sites near Avala. The process continued over the following days. Between 19 and 20 March 1942 the patients and staff of the hospital were murdered using a mobile gas van. Estimates of the number of victims vary, with figures ranging from about 500 to between 700 and 800 people.

The killing of the hospital patients and staff formed part of the final phase of the extermination of the Jewish population of German-occupied Serbia. By 9 May 1942 Jewish women and children from the Sajmište concentration camp, together with the patients and staff of the Jewish hospital in Belgrade and other Jewish prisoners, had all been asphyxiated in gas vans. In August 1942 Harald Turner, head of the German military administration's staff in Belgrade, reported that "Serbia is the only country in Europe where the Jewish problem has been solved".

== Legacy ==
In March 2018, almost eight decades later, a memorial plaque was placed on the building of the former Jewish Hospital, today the Faculty of Special Education and Rehabilitation.

In this building of the Jewish Women's Society, during 1941–1942, the Jewish Hospital operated, where Jews, our fellow citizens, were treated. In March 1942, the Gestapo took all the doctors, hospital staff, and 800 patients, in a mobile gas truck to their deaths.

== See also ==
- The Holocaust in German-occupied Serbia
- History of the Jews in Serbia
- History of the Jews in Yugoslavia
