= 1877 Serbian parliamentary election =

- 20 February 1877
- All 420 seats in the Grand National Assembly; 211 seats needed for a majority
Prime Minister before	Prime Minister after
Stevča Mihailović; Liberal	Stevča Mihailović; Liberal

Parliamentary elections were held in Serbia on 20 February 1877 to elect members of the Grand National Assembly. The elections were called by Prince Milan on 13 February in order to convene a Grand National Assembly, which would have four times as many members as a normal National Assembly. The newly elected Assembly was to convene on 26 February in the National Theatre.

A majority of the elected candidates were in favour of peace with the Ottoman Empire. For the first time a Jewish candidate was elected, winning a seat in Belgrade by a large majority after receiving the backing of all parties.

The elections were marred by violence in Kragujevac, Jagodina and Užice, with pressure to elect candidates favourable to the incumbent government and interference from the Karađorđević dynasty blamed. The election results in Kragujevac and Jagodina were later annulled due to the fighting. Government pressure resulted in the election of several Liberals in Belgrade despite the city being a Conservative stronghold, with over 600 voters in the city being prevented from voting by delays.
