= John P. Dear =

John P. Dear FREng
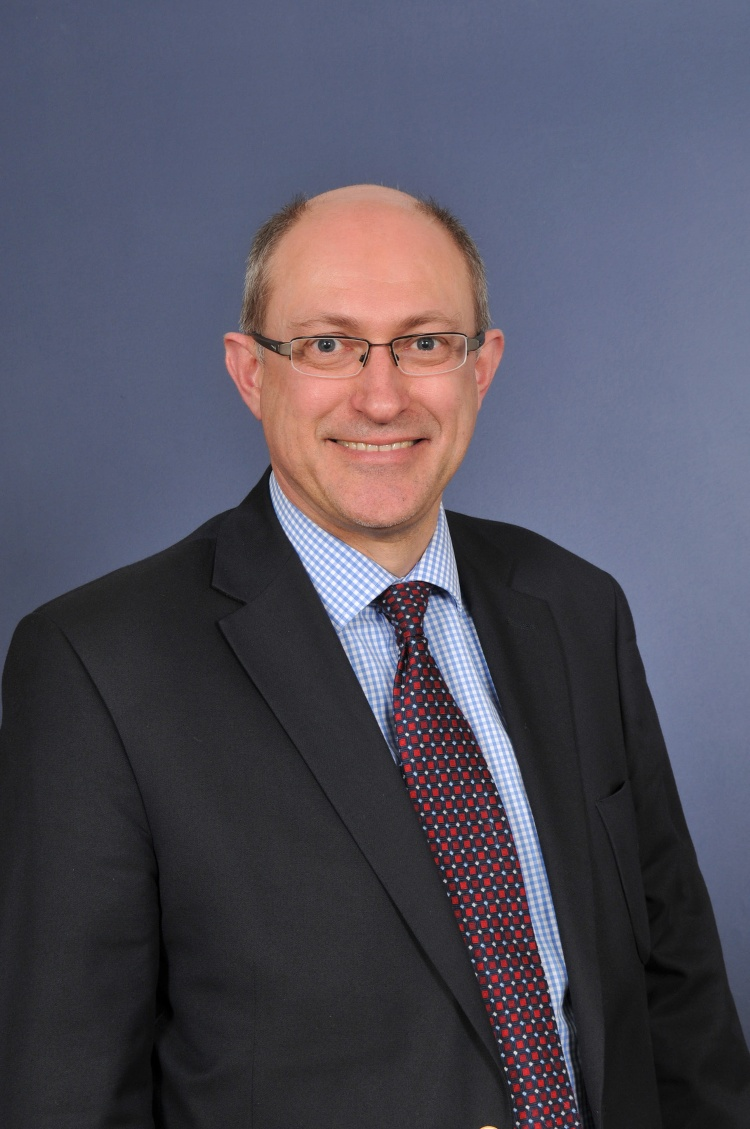
- Born: Stourport-on-Severn
- Occupation: Professor in Mechanical Engineering
- Awards: George Stephenson Medal from Institution of Mechanical Engineers (2006); Fellow of Institution of Mechanical Engineers (2002); Fellow of Institute of Physics (2002); Fellow of Royal Academy of Engineering (2023)

Academic background
- Education: University of Cambridge; Cavendish Laboratory; St John's College, Cambridge; Girton College, Cambridge

Academic work
- Discipline: Composite material; Impact (mechanics); Structural integrity and failure
- Institutions: Imperial College London

John P. Dear is a British academic and educator who is a faculty member and professor at the Department of Mechanical Engineering of Imperial College London, and a Fellow of the Royal Academy of Engineering (FREng).

== Early life and education ==
John Dear attended St John's College, Cambridge where he read Natural Sciences (Physics) as an undergraduate, followed by PhD study at St John's College, supervised by John Edwin Field on high strain rate properties of materials subject to impact.

After his PhD, Dear was an SERC Research Fellow at the Cavendish Laboratory and Hertha Ayrton Research Fellow at Girton College.

== Career and research ==
Dear joined the Department of Mechanical Engineering at Imperial College London in April 1988, as the BP Chemicals Lecturer, researching the structural integrity of plastic pipes and applying high-speed visualization techniques to fracture processes in composite materials. Since 1989, Dear has been a Chartered Engineer (UK) (CEng) and a Chartered Physicist (CPhys). In 2002, he was elected a Fellow of the Institution of Mechanical Engineers and a Fellow of the Institute of Physics (FInstP). In 2006, Dear was awarded the George Stephenson Medal by the Institution of Mechanical Engineers for best IMechE paper. In 2023, Dear was elected a Fellow of the Royal Academy of Engineering (FREng).

Dear pioneered and led a group that has developed 3D high-speed speckle strain mapping and other strain visualisation techniques, with related Finite Element damage modelling, for assessment of the safety of engineering structures. This work, in collaboration with Professor Tony Kinloch FREng FRS, has been applied to impact of composite and laminated glass structures for civil aircraft and aeroengines, for Airbus and Rolls-Royce, as well as explosive blast mitigation research of building façade structures with the National Protective Security Authority (NPSA). This research was for risk assessment of the terrorist threats to buildings and vehicles. The techniques have also been employed to develop blast resilient composite structures for the US Office of Naval Research. Recently, John Dear's research group has focused on drop-weight impact of thermoplastic composites with associated modelling of damage and subsequent repair of composites.
