= Jaime Deer =

American police officer

Jaime Deer is an American police officer. In the 2010s, he was one of the only openly transgender law enforcement officers in the United States.

== Career ==
Deer is an officer with the King County Police Department in Washington state. He joined the police force in 1998.

In 2017, he was a guest speaker at a community breakfast hosted by Mason County Sheriff Casey Salisbury. In June 2018, he was recognized by NBC Out as a LGBTQ+ innovator and change maker for being one of the only openly transgender law enforcement officers in the United States. Later that year, he was asked by the United States Department of Justice to improve their national training program for law enforcement.

In 2021, Deer spoke out publicly against Seattle's decision to disallow police officers from marching in Pride Month parades while in uniform.

== Personal life ==
Deer married his wife, Kay, a police dispatcher, in 2014.

He is a trans man and began taking hormone replacement therapy in 2016.
