= Dearing =

Dearing, as a name, may refer to:

- Bob Dearing (born 1935), Democratic member of the Mississippi Senate
- Charles Dearing, former New Zealand fencer
- Denise Dearing, American ecological physiologist and mammalogist
- Edgar Dearing (1893–1974), American actor
- James Dearing (1840–1865), Confederate States Army officer during the American Civil War
- Paul Dearing (1942–2015), Australian field hockey player
- R. E. Dearing (1893–1968), English film editor
- Ronald Dearing, Baron Dearing (1930–2009), English civil servant
- Sidney Dearing (1870–1953), American businessperson

Dearing, as a place, may refer to:

- Dearing, Georgia, a town in McDuffie County, Georgia, United States
- Dearing, Kansas, a city in Montgomery County, Kansas, United States

Dearing may also refer to:

- Dearing Report, a series of reports on Higher Education in the United Kingdom
- Dearing House (Newark, Arkansas), a historic house in Arkansas
