= Alice Darr =

American jazz musician and songwriter (1930–2024)

- Born: Alice Regina Darr; April 22, 1930; Cumberland, Maryland
- Died: February 4, 2024 (aged 93); Cumberland, Maryland
- Known for: musician

Alice Regina Darr (April 22, 1930 – February 4, 2024) was an American jazz musician and songwriter.

== Life and work ==
Alice Darr grew up on Pine Avenue in Cumberland, Maryland, and attended the Carver School. At age seven, she won an amateur competition; at 17, she performed professionally. Her father, James Darr, worked as a jazz musician with many well-known musicians of his time at the local level. Alice not only sang but learned to play the piano and snare drum at a young age. She first gained experience performing at the Cadillac Cocktail Lounge in downtown Cumberland, where she was eventually discovered by a brother of singer Nat King Cole. Soon after, she received a call from an agent in Pittsburgh, which led to a nationwide tour. She performed in New York, Miami Beach, Chicago, and Mexico, where she had engagements in supper clubs, including extended periods at The Toast (1068 First Avenue) and The Left Bank in Manhattan. Darr also performed all over the world, for many years in Europe, for example in 1970 with Milt Jackson in Paris. Television host Ed Sullivan praised her as having "a lot of talent" in his column in the New York Daily News. Billboard magazine praised Alice Darr as "talented, with the ability to project a ballad with feeling and warmth".

Darr released her first album, I Only Know How to Cry – Music for Lovers and Losers, in 1962. The album was released by Charlie Parker Records; the title track was written by Joan Moskatel, who wrote or co-wrote four of the twelve songs. The arrangements were by guitarist Mundell Lowe, who also co-wrote four of the songs, and accompanied Darr along with bassist George Duvivier. On her second album, At the Living Room (Numera), recorded in France in 1972, she was accompanied by Gilbert Rovère (bass) and Charles Saudrais (drums). Further material appeared on All In My Mind, coupled with two songs by Maxine Brown.

In 1955 Darr became the first woman of color to appear in a national magazine (Jet) wearing a bikini.

Darr died on February 4, 2024, at the Allegany Health Nursing and Rehabilitation Center in Cumberland at the age of 93.
