= Dan Dare (disambiguation) =

Dan Dare is a British comic strip hero. The character featured in spin off media:

- Dan Dare: Pilot of the Future, a 1986 video game
- Dan Dare: Pilot of the Future (TV series), a 2002 computer animation television series

Dan Dare may also refer to:

- Dan Dare (Fawcett Comics), a fictional detective featured in Fawcett Comics' Whiz Comics
- "Dan Dare (Pilot of the Future)", a song on Elton John's tenth studio album, Rock of the Westies
- Dan Dare, member of Australian New Wave band The Manikins
