= Robert Darr =

American author of books on Sufism (born 1951)

Robert Abdul Hayy Darr
- Born: 1951 (age 74–75); Orange County, California, U.S.
- Known for: Books on Sufism

Robert Darr (born 1951 in Orange County, California), also known as Robert Abdul Hayy Darr, is the author of several books on Sufism.

A U.S. citizen and resident of the San Francisco Bay Area, Darr is a translator and interpreter of classic Islamic mystical texts. He was introduced to Sufism in the 1970s through the works of Idries Shah. By 1985 he left the Shah groups and began working in Afghan refugee camps in Pakistan and making overland trips inside Afghanistan. There he befriended a number of Sufis in the region including Khalilullah Khalili. Darr spent the next couple of decades studying traditional Sufism along with specialized disciplines such as abjad (Islamic numerology). From 1988 to 1998, he studied miniature painting with Afghanistan's great miniaturist, Homayon Etemadi (died 2007). For almost two decades he was the student of the late Afghan Sufi, Raz Mohammed Zaray (died October 2010). Since 1996, Darr has been the director of the Arques School Of Traditional Boatbuilding in Sausalito, California.

== Books ==
- Quatrains Khalili. The Afghan Cultural Assistance Foundation. Sausalito. 1989.
- Clarifications. Mystical Poetry of Rumi . Real Impressions. Sausalito. 2002.
- The Garden of Mystery. The Gulshani-i raz of Mahmud Shabistari. Archetype. 2007. ISBN 978-1-901383-22-5
- The Spy of the Heart. Fons Vitae. 2007. ISBN 978-1-929148-62-2
