= Bringing the Dark Past to Light =

Bringing the Dark Past to Light: The Reception of the Holocaust in Postcommunist Europe
- Genre: Essay Collection
- Publisher: University of Nebraska Press
- Publication date: 2013

Bringing the Dark Past to Light: The Reception of the Holocaust in Postcommunist Europe (2013) is a collection of twenty essays that explore the reception of how the Holocaust is remembered and represented in the history of various post-Communist countries. Each essay focuses on a different country. The book has received mostly positive reviews.
