= Kevin Dare =

English footballer

Personal information
- Full name: Kevin John Dare
- Date of birth: 15 November 1959 (age 66)
- Place of birth: Finchley, Greater London
- Position: Left back

Youth career
- ?–1977: Crystal Palace

Senior career*
Years	Team	Apps	(Gls)
1977–1982	Crystal Palace	6	(0)
1982–?	Enfield	?	(?)

International career
1977	England Youth	1	(0)
- * Club domestic league appearances and goals

Kevin John Dare (born 15 November 1959 in Finchley) is an English former professional footballer who played for Crystal Palace in the Football League as a left back. He began his youth career at Crystal Palace and signed professional terms in February 1977. He did not make his League debut until 1981 as Palace had a number of other options at full back including Kenny Sansom, Terry Fenwick and Paul Hinshelwood. In 1982 after only six appearances for Palace, Dare moved on, to non-league football with Enfield.
