= Derr =

Derr is a surname. Notable people with the surname include:

- Allen Derr (1928–2013), American lawyer
- A. M. Derr (1903–1970), American politician from Idaho
- E.B. Derr (1891 – 1974), American actor
- John W. Derr (born 1941), former Maryland State Senator
- Kenneth T. Derr, American businessman
- Zac Derr, American football placekicker
- Richard Derr (1918–1992), American film and television actor
- Jill Mulvay Derr (born 1948), American history professor
- Manuela Derr (born 1971), retired East German sprinter

== See also ==
- Temple of Derr, Ancient Egyptian temple
