= Jewish Historical Museum, Belgrade =

Jewish Historical Museum
- Јеврејски историјски музеј המוזיאון להיסטוריה יהודית בבלגרד
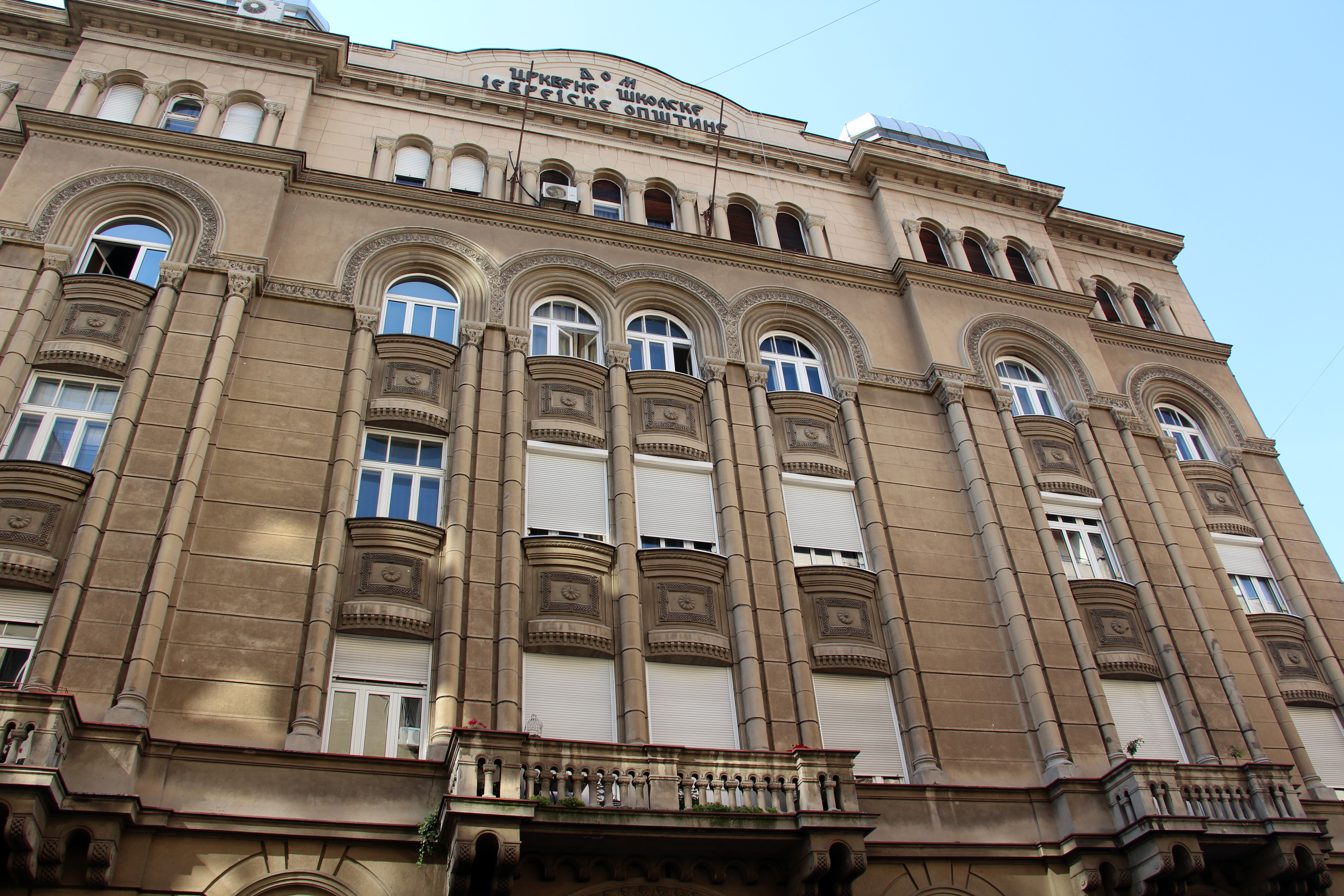
- Jewish Historical Museum
- Established: 1948; 78 years ago
- Location: Kralja Petra 71a, Belgrade, Serbia
- Coordinates: 44.8213°N 20.4569°E
- Type: Jewish museum
- Owner: Federation of Jewish Communities of Serbia

The Jewish Historical Museum (Serbian: Јеврејски историјски музеј / Jevrejski istorijski muzej, Hebrew: המוזיאון להיסטוריה יהודית בבלגרד, romanized: HaMuzeon LeHistoriah Yehudit BeBelgrad; abbr. JHM) is a museum located in downtown Belgrade, Serbia. Founded in 1948, it is the only Jewish museum in the country. The museum focuses on the history of Belgradian Jews from the 2nd century until World War II, encompassing also the lives of Jews who lived in Serbia and Yugoslavia.

== History ==
The Jewish Historical Museum was established in 1948. It is housed in a building built in 1928 for the city's Sephardic community; an inscription near the top of the building states: "The Home of the Jewish Religious-School Community".

In 2005, the museum donated a thematic collection to the United States Holocaust Memorial Museum International Archives Project Division. It contained documents regarding "arrests and persecutions of, and reprisals against, Jews, members of antifascist movements, communists, and the general population" as well as documents regarding concentration camps in the former Yugoslavia.

Unlike the Jewish museum in Sarajevo, which is administered by the city, the Belgrade museum falls under the auspices of the Federation of Jewish Communities of Serbia. Milica Mihajlović, daughter of General Herbert Kraus, Minister of Health, served as curator (1964–90) and director (1990–06) before retiring in 2007. The current director is Vojislava Radovanović.

== Collection ==
The museum's collection is comprehensive and also complex in its content, with exhibits arranged thematically. A rich collection of items, documents and photographs on the history of the Jews in Serbia and Yugoslavia is exhibited. There are 1,000 ethnological items including books and historical and Holocaust collections, as well as paintings and drawings. The museum has documents related to the Zemun Jews. The archives in the museum also contain several of the annotated documents related to the sufferings of the Jews of Yugoslavia written by Jaša Almuli, former president of the Belgrade Jewish Community. The museum's embroidery and costume collection was displayed in 1978 in London at the International Centenary Conference of the Folklore Society. In 2013, a new exhibition opened called "Synagogical Ritual Items", containing deported items which were never displayed previously. In addition to the museum, the building houses a children's theater, the Jewish Community Belgrade (second floor), and the Federation of Jewish Communities of Serbia (third floor).

== See also ==
- History of the Jews in Serbia
- List of museums in Serbia
