= Joseph Dare (minister) =

Joseph Dare (1831–1880) was an Australian Wesleyan Church leader.

A native of Dorsetshire (now Dorset), England, Dare emigrated to South Australia when a youth. Possessed of a noble presence, and favored with a magnificent voice, he was a very attractive preacher. He was as useful as he was popular. His health failed, and his friends subscribed the cost of defraying his expenses for a visit to the United States and Great Britain.

While in the United States he preached at Bound Lake camp meeting a sermon remarkable for its eloquence, and for the unction which attended it. On his return to Australia he was elected President of the Victoria and Tasmania Conference.

One story related about Dare is that he chaired the church meeting in which Henry Howard first tried to make a public speech, and completely broke down. The next day, Howard told Dare that in view of his failure, he had resolved never to attempt public speaking again. Dare replied, "I don't call that a failure, a real failure is when a man talks for an hour and says nothing". Howard went on to become a noted Australian Methodist minister and writer.

Dare's health gradually declined, and he died at the early age of forty-nine. He had two daughters, Emily and Annie. A street in Ocean Grove, Victoria, is named for him.
