= History of the Jews in Serbia =

Serbian Jews
Српски Јевреји יהדות סרביה
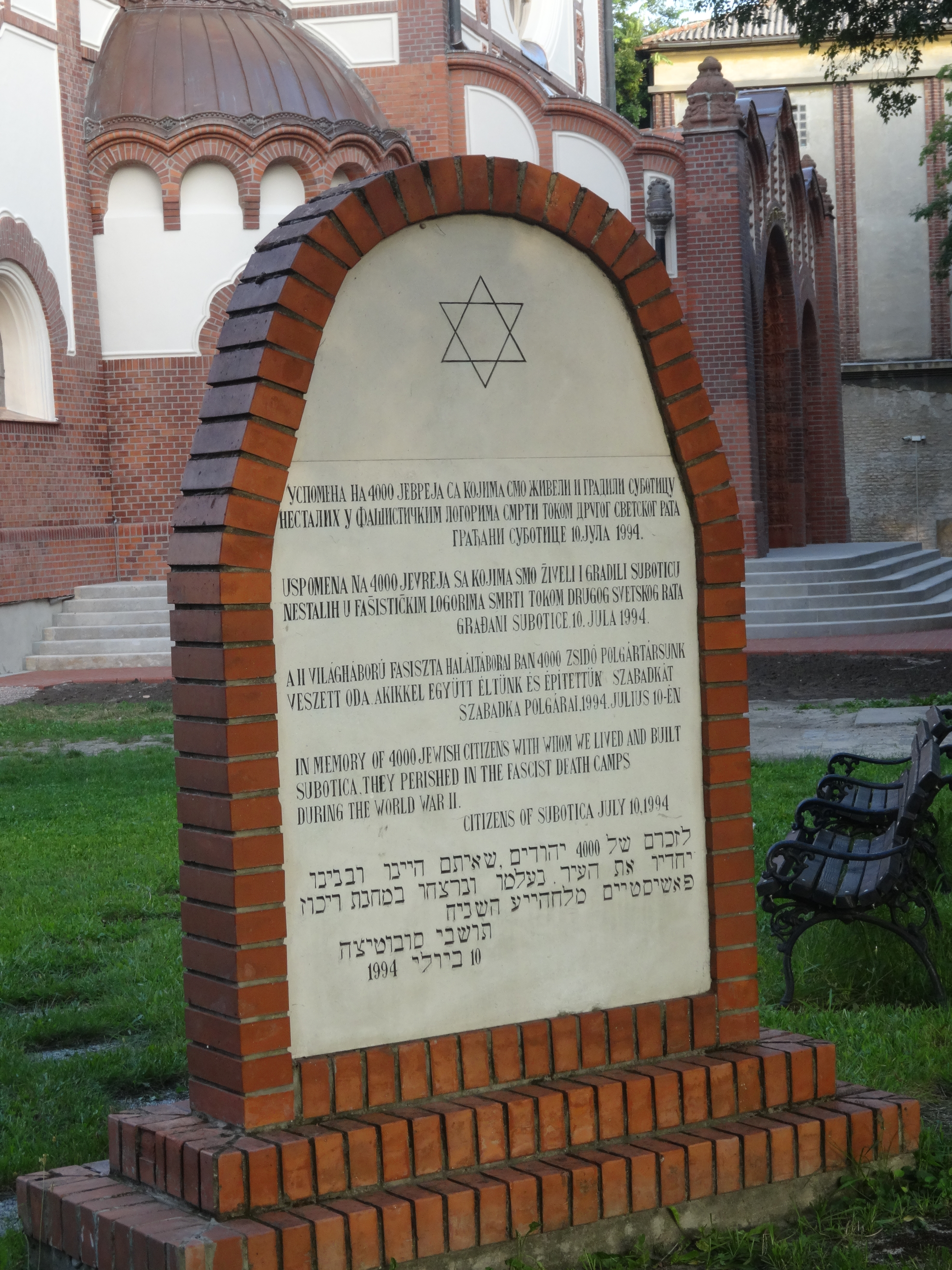
- A plaque dedicated to the Jews of Subotica murdered in the Holocaust: "In memory of the 4,000 Jews with whom we lived and built Subotica together and who perished in fascist death camps in World War II."

Total population
- 709 (2022)

Languages
- Serbian, Hebrew, Ladino, Yiddish

Religion
- Judaism

Related ethnic groups
- Sephardi Jews, Ashkenazi Jews, Montenegrin Jews

The history of the Jews in Serbia is some two thousand years old. The Jews first arrived in the region during Roman times. The Jewish communities of the Balkans remained small until the late 15th century, when Jews fleeing the Spanish and Portuguese Inquisitions found refuge in the Ottoman-ruled areas, including Serbia. The community flourished and reached a peak of 33,000, of whom almost 90% were living in Belgrade and Vojvodina, before World War II. About two-thirds of Serbian Jews were murdered in The Holocaust. After the war, most of the remaining Jewish Serbian population emigrated, mainly to Israel. According to data from the 2022 census, only 709 people declared themselves Jewish.

== History ==
=== Antiquity ===
Jews first arrived on the territory of present-day Serbia in Roman times, although there is little documentation prior to the 10th century.

=== Ottoman rule ===
The Jewish communities of the Balkans were boosted in the 15th and 16th centuries by the arrival of Jewish refugees fleeing the Spanish and Portuguese Inquisitions. Sultan Bayezid II of the Ottoman Empire welcomed the Jewish refugees into his Empire. Jews became involved in trade between the various provinces in the Ottoman Empire, becoming especially important in the salt trade. In 1663, the Jewish population of Belgrade was around 800.

While the rest of modern-day Serbia was still ruled by the Ottoman Empire, territory of present-day Vojvodina was part of the Habsburg monarchy. In 1782, Emperor Joseph II issued the Edict of Tolerance, giving Jews some measure of religious freedom. The Edict attracted Jews to many parts of the Monarchy. The Jewish communities of Vojvodina flourished, and by the end of the 19th century the region had nearly 40 Jewish communities.

=== Principality of Serbia ===
Many Jews were involved in the Serbian Revolution, by supplying arms to the local Serbs, and the Jewish communities faced brutal reprisal attacks from the Ottoman Turks. In 1804, when revolutionary forces under Karađorđe attacked the Ottoman fortress of Smederevo, the Jews were expelled from Šabac and Požarevac. After Belgrade was liberated, the Jews fell victim to decades of discriminatory taxation and residential restrictions. Contrary to the orders issued by Karađorđe, some of the rebels destroyed Jewish shops and synagogues in the town while some Jews were killed while a part of them was forcibly baptised. Elsewhere in Serbia, Serb rebels expelled Jews from towns and small places.

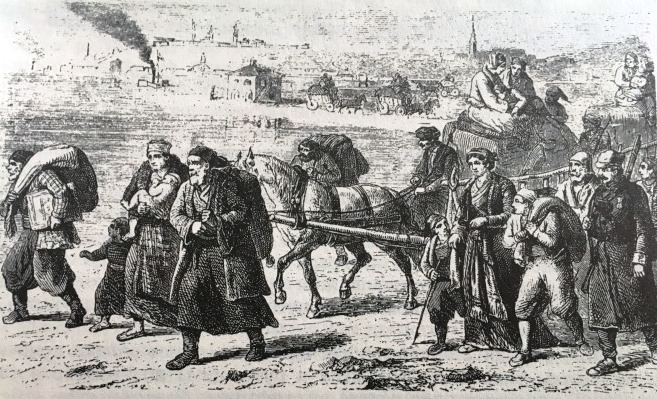
Sephardi Jews fleeing from Belgrade to Zemun, 1862

In 1830, Serbia was granted autonomy within the Ottoman Empire.

With the reclamation of the Serbian throne by the House of Obrenović under Miloš Obrenović in 1858, restrictions on Jewish merchants were again relaxed for some time, but only three years later they faced isolation and humiliation. In 1861, Mihailo Obrenović inherited the throne and reinstated anti-Jewish restrictions. In 1839, Jews were forbidden to open shops on Sundays and during Serbian holidays, causing them great damage because their shops were closed on Saturdays and all Jewish holidays. In 1877 parliamentary election a Jewish candidate was elected to the National Assembly for the first time, after receiving the backing of all parties.

In the 1860s–70s, some Serbian newspapers began publishing anti-Jewish articles resulting in threats being raised against the Jews. In 1862, a fight broke out between the Austrians and Serbians and Jews in Belgrade had their rights revoked, similar to local uprisings in the 1840s.

During the final stages of the 1877–1878 Serbo-Ottoman wars thousands of Jews emigrated or were expelled by the advancing Armed Forces of the Principality of Serbia along with Turkish and Albanian families.

=== Kingdom of Serbia ===
In 1879, the "Serbian-Jewish Singer Society" was founded in Belgrade to encourage Serbian-Jewish interaction and friendship. During World War I and World War II the choir was not allowed to perform. It was renamed the "Baruch Brothers Choir" in 1950 and is one of the oldest Jewish choirs in the world still in existence. The choir remains a symbol of community unification, although only 20% of the choir members are actually Jewish due to the dwindling Jewish population in the country (in World War II, half of the Jewish population of Serbia was killed). By 1912, the Jewish community of the Kingdom of Serbia stood at 5,000.

The waxing and waning of the fortunes of the Jewish community according to the ruler continued to the end of the 19th century, when the Serbian parliament lifted all anti-Jewish restrictions in 1889.

Serbian-Jewish relations reached a high degree of cooperation during World War I, when Jews and Serbs fought side by side against the Central Powers. Some 132 Jews died in the Balkan Wars and World War I and in their honour a monument to them was erected in Belgrade at the Jewish Sephardic cemetery.

Jews in modern-day North Macedonia got their full citizen rights for the first time when the region became a part of the Kingdom of Serbia.

=== Kingdom of Yugoslavia ===
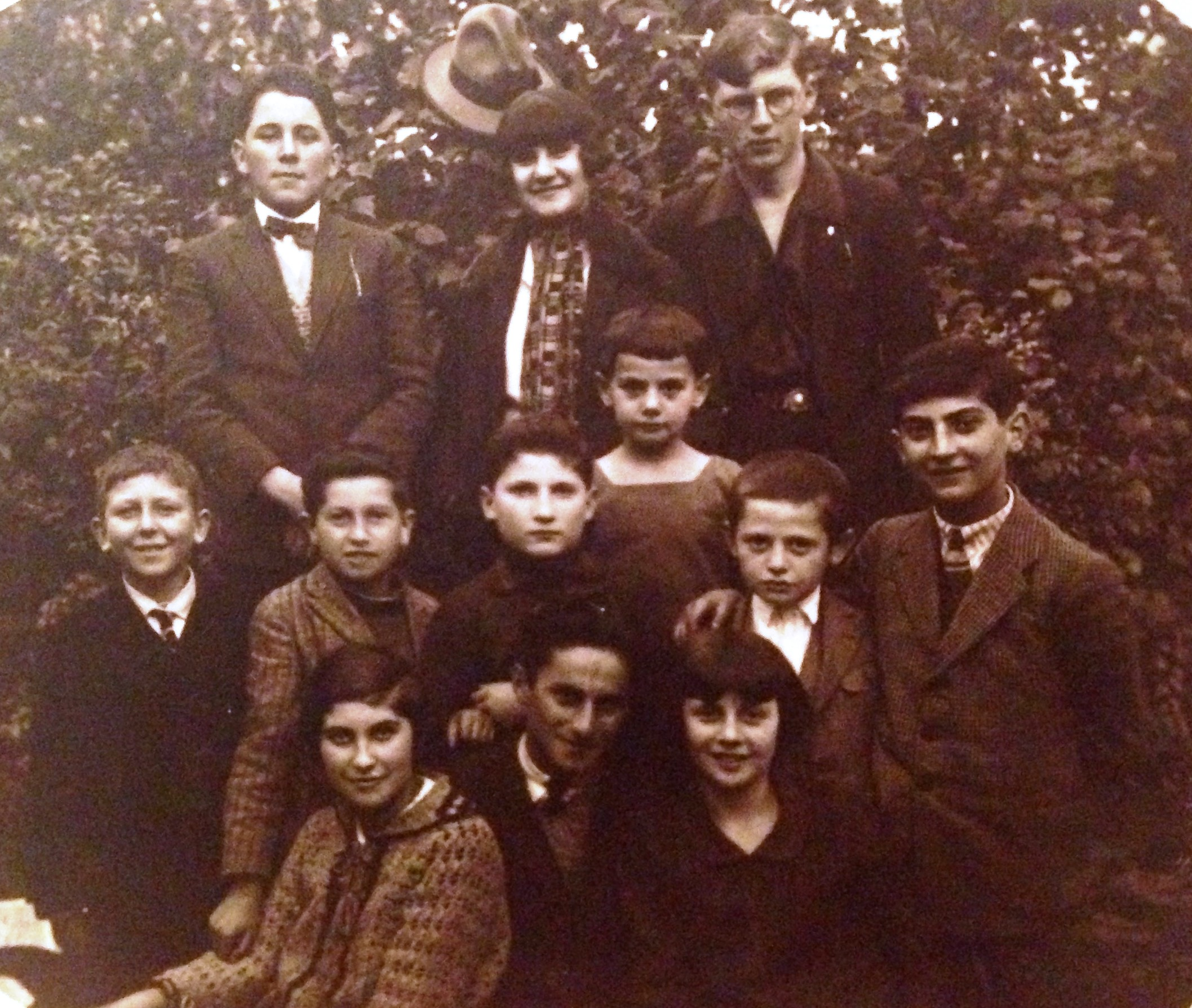
Jewish children in Ruma, 1920

In the aftermath of World War I, Montenegro, Banat, Bačka, Syrmia, and Baranya joined Serbia through popular vote in those regions, and soon afterwards this enlarged Serbia united with State of Slovenes, Croats and Serbs (from which Syrmia had seceded to join Serbia) to form the Kingdom of Serbs, Croats, and Slovenes, which was soon renamed Kingdom of Yugoslavia. Serbia's relatively small Jewish community of 13,000 (including 500 in Kosovo), combined with the large Jewish communities of the other Yugoslav territories, numbering some 51,700. Prior to World War II, some 31,000 Jews lived in Vojvodina. In Belgrade, Jewish community was 10,000-strong, 80% being Ladino-speaking Sephardi Jews, and 20% being Ashkenazi Jews.

In the interwar period, the Jewish communities of the Kingdom of Yugoslavia flourished. The Vidovdan Constitution guaranteed equality to Jews, and the law regulated their status as a religious community. However, in October 1940, then education Minister Anton Korošec introduced two antisemitic laws while serving in the Macek-Cvetkovic government. One limited the participation of Jews in the wholesale food industry, while the other put a limit on the number of Jewish students in secondary schools and universities. When other ministers objected to the laws, Korošec insisted that failure to introduce them would endanger relations with Germany, and the laws were indeed accepted.

=== World War II ===
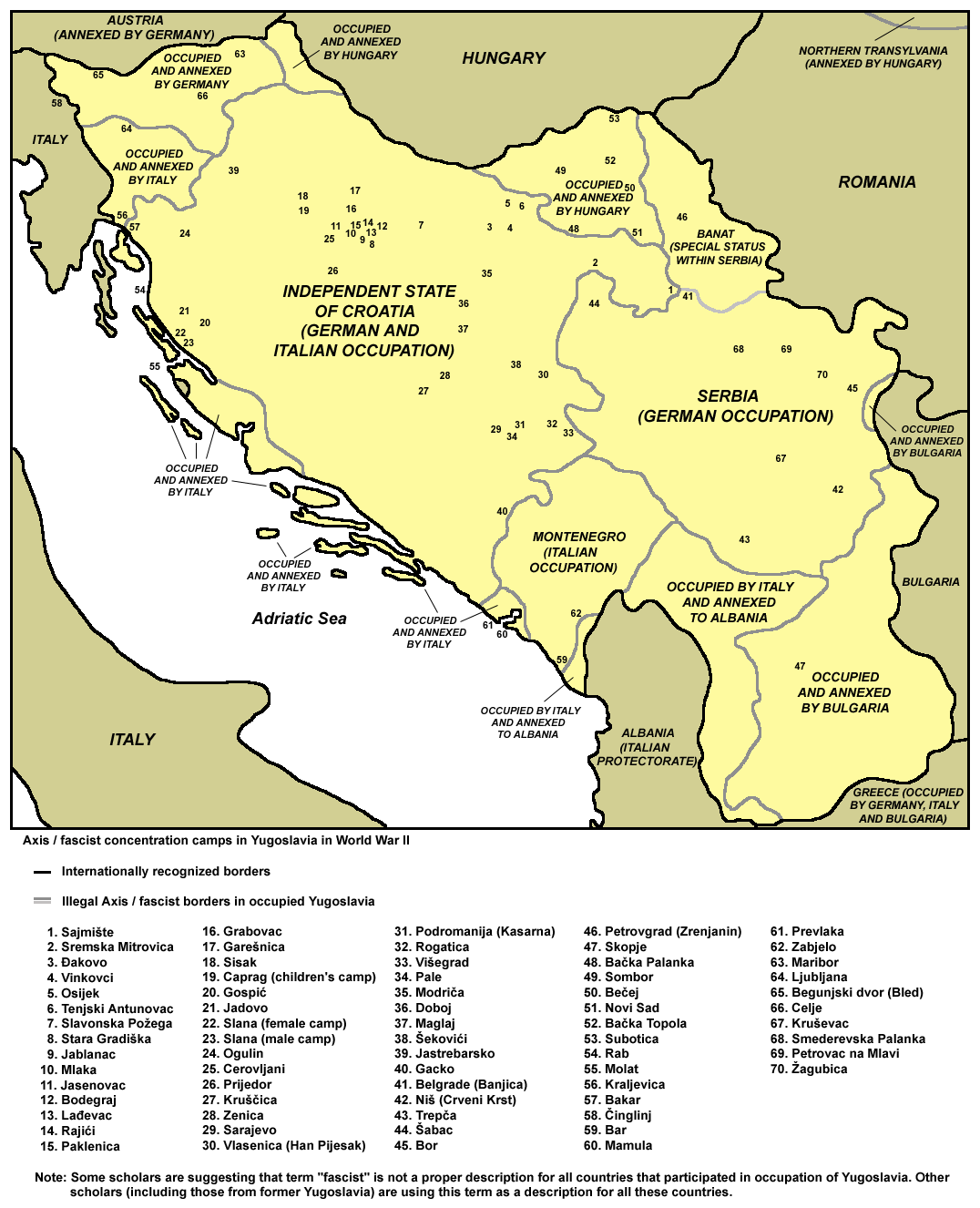
Concentration camps in Yugoslavia in World War II

The Kingdom of Yugoslavia attempted to maintain neutrality during the period preceding World War II. Milan Stojadinović, the prime minister, tried to actively woo Adolf Hitler while maintaining the alliance with the former Entente Powers, UK and France. Nonwithstanding overtures to Germany, Yugoslav policy was not antisemitic: for instance, Yugoslavia opened its borders to Austrian Jews following the Anschluss. Under increasing pressure to yield to German demands for safe passage of its troops to Greece, Yugoslavia signed the Tripartite Pact with Germany and Italy, like Bulgaria and Hungary. Unlike the other two, the signatory government of Maček and Cvetković was overthrown three days later in a British-supported coup of patriotic, anti-German generals. The new government immediately rescinded the Yugoslav signature on the Pact and called for strict neutrality. German response was swift and brutal: Belgrade was bombed without the declaration of war on 6 April 1941 and German, Italian, Hungarian and Bulgarian troops invaded Yugoslavia.

In German-occupied Serbia, German occupiers established concentration camps and extermination policies with the assistance of the puppet government of Milan Nedić.

The Nazi genocide against Yugoslav Jews began in April 1941. The territory of Serbia was completely occupied by the Nazis. The main race laws in the State of Serbia were adopted on 30 April 1941: the Legal Decree on Racial Origins (Zakonska odredba o rasnoj pripadnosti). Jews from Syrmia were sent to Croatian camps, as were many Jews from other parts of Serbia. In rump Serbia, Germans proceeded to round up Jews of Banat and Belgrade, setting up a concentration camp across the river Sava, in the Syrmian part of Belgrade, then given to the Independent State of Croatia. The Sajmište concentration camp was established to process and eliminate the captured Jews and Serbs. As a result, Emanuel Schäfer, commander of the Security Police and Gestapo in Serbia, famously cabled Berlin after the last Jews were killed in May 1942: Serbien ist judenfrei. Similarly, Harald Turner of the SS stated in 1942 that "Serbia is the only country in which the Jewish question and the Gypsy question has been solved."

By the time Serbia and Yugoslavia were liberated in 1944, most of the Serbian Jewry had been murdered. Of the 82,500 Jews of Yugoslavia alive in 1941, only 14,000 (17%) survived the Holocaust. Of the Jewish population of 16,000 in the territory controlled by Nazi puppet government of Milan Nedić, police and secret services murdered approximately 14,500.

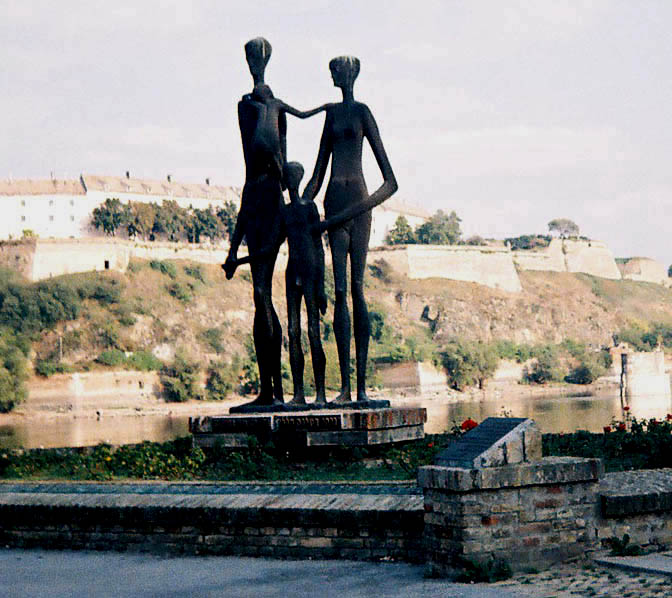
Monument in Novi Sad dedicated to killed Serbs and Jews in Novi Sad raid

There was a similar persecution of Jews in the territory of present-day Vojvodina, which was annexed by Hungary. In the 1942 raid in Novi Sad, the Hungarian troops killed many Jewish and non-Jewish Serb civilians in Bačka.

Historian Christopher Browning who attended the conference on the subject of Holocaust and Serbian involvement stated: "Serbia was the only country outside Poland and the Soviet Union where all Jewish victims were killed on the spot without deportation, and was the first country after Estonia to be declared "Judenfrei", a term used by the Nazis during the Holocaust to denote an area free of all Jews."

Serbian civilians were involved in saving thousands of Yugoslavian Jews during this period. Miriam Steiner-Aviezer, a researcher into Yugoslavian Jewry and a member of Yad Vashem's Righteous Gentiles committee states: "The Serbs saved many Jews." As of 2022, Yad Vashem recognizes 139 Serbians as Righteous Among Nations, the highest number among Balkan countries.

According to Yad Vashem, the Chetniks initially had an ambivalent attitude towards Jews and, given their status early in the war as a resistance movement against Nazi occupation, a number of Jews served among the Chetnik ranks. As the Yugoslav Partisans grew in number and power, the anti-communist Chetniks became increasingly collaborationist and Jewish Chetniks switched to the partisan ranks. Subsequently, after the first half of 1942, Chetnik propaganda with chauvinist and antisemitic themes became a constant. In various places in Serbia in the period from the middle of 1942, several hundred Jews were hiding, mostly women and children. According to the testimonies of surviving Jews, the Chetniks of Draža Mihailović persecuted the Jews in that area, and took part in their killing. On many occasions, the Chetniks also handed them over to the Germans.

=== Socialist Yugoslavia ===
The Federation of Jewish Communities in Yugoslavia was formed in the aftermath of World War II to coordinate the Jewish communities of post-war Yugoslavia and to lobby for the right of Jews to immigrate to Israel. More than half of Yugoslav survivors chose to immigrate to Israel after World War II.

=== Breakup of Yugoslavia ===
Prior to the Yugoslav Wars in the 1990s, approximately 2,500 Jews lived in Serbia, mostly in Belgrade.

The Jews of Serbia lived peacefully in Yugoslavia between World War II and the 1990s, when the breakup of Yugoslavia and ensuing civil wars occurred.

Amid the Yugoslav Wars and international sanctions against Serbia, many Jews chose to immigrate to Israel and the United States. During the NATO bombing in 1999, the Federation of Jewish Communities in Yugoslavia relocated many of Belgrade's Jewish elderly, women and children to Budapest, Hungary, for their safety; many of them emigrated permanently.

David Bruce Macdonald states that Serbian nationalists used Jewish imagery, such as the Legend of Masada, in order to justify claims of Kosovo by comparing antisemitism and Serbophobia. This theory is supported by Jovan Byford who writes that Serbian nationalists used the Jewish question for the martyrdom myth characteristic of Serbian nationalist discourse in the 1980s.

=== Contemporary period ===
Manifestations of antisemitism in Serbia are relatively rare and isolated. According to the US State Department Report on Human Rights practices in Serbia for 2006: "Jewish leaders in Serbia reported rare incidents of anti-Semitism, including anti-Semitic graffiti, vandalism, small circulation anti-Semitic books, and Internet postings". In 2013, downtown Belgrade was covered by posters, reportedly distributed by the Serbian branch of Blood & Honour, accusing Jews of being responsible for the 1999 NATO bombing of Serbia.

The Serbian state recognizes Judaism as one of the seven "traditional" religious communities of Serbia. The only remaining functioning synagogue in Serbia is the Belgrade Synagogue.

== Demographics ==
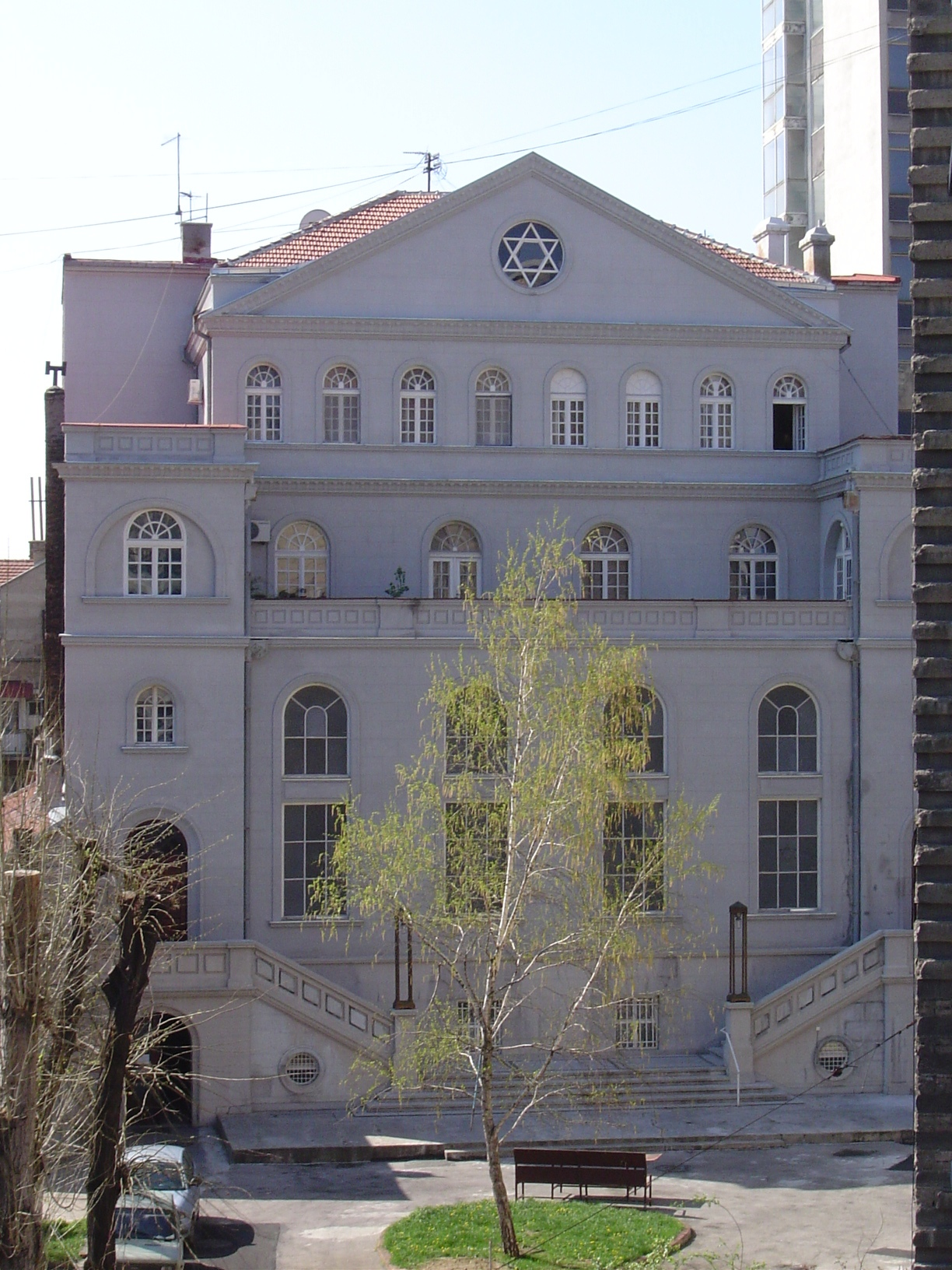
Belgrade Synagogue, the only functioning synagogue in the country

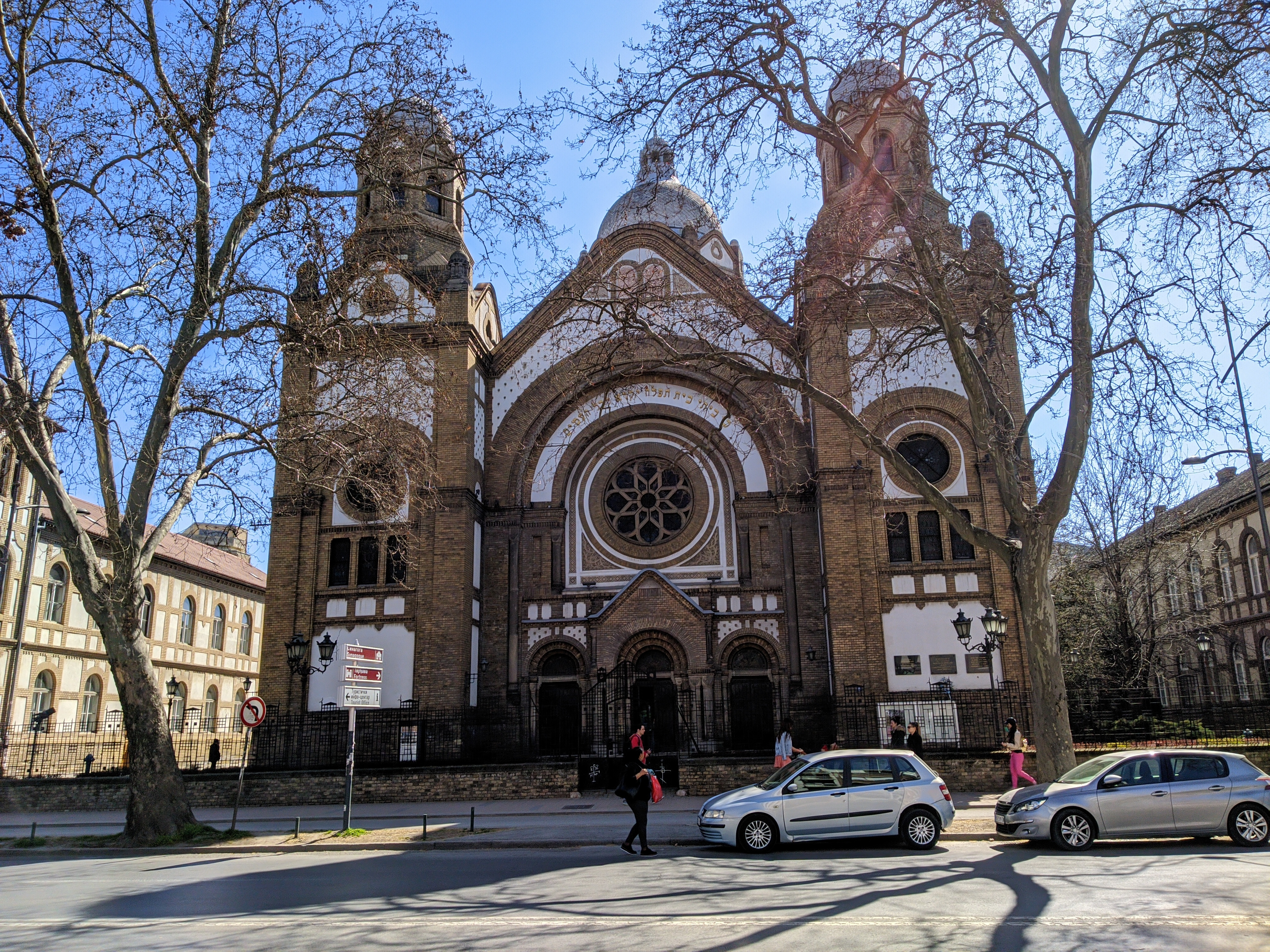
Novi Sad Synagogue, repurposed to a cultural venue

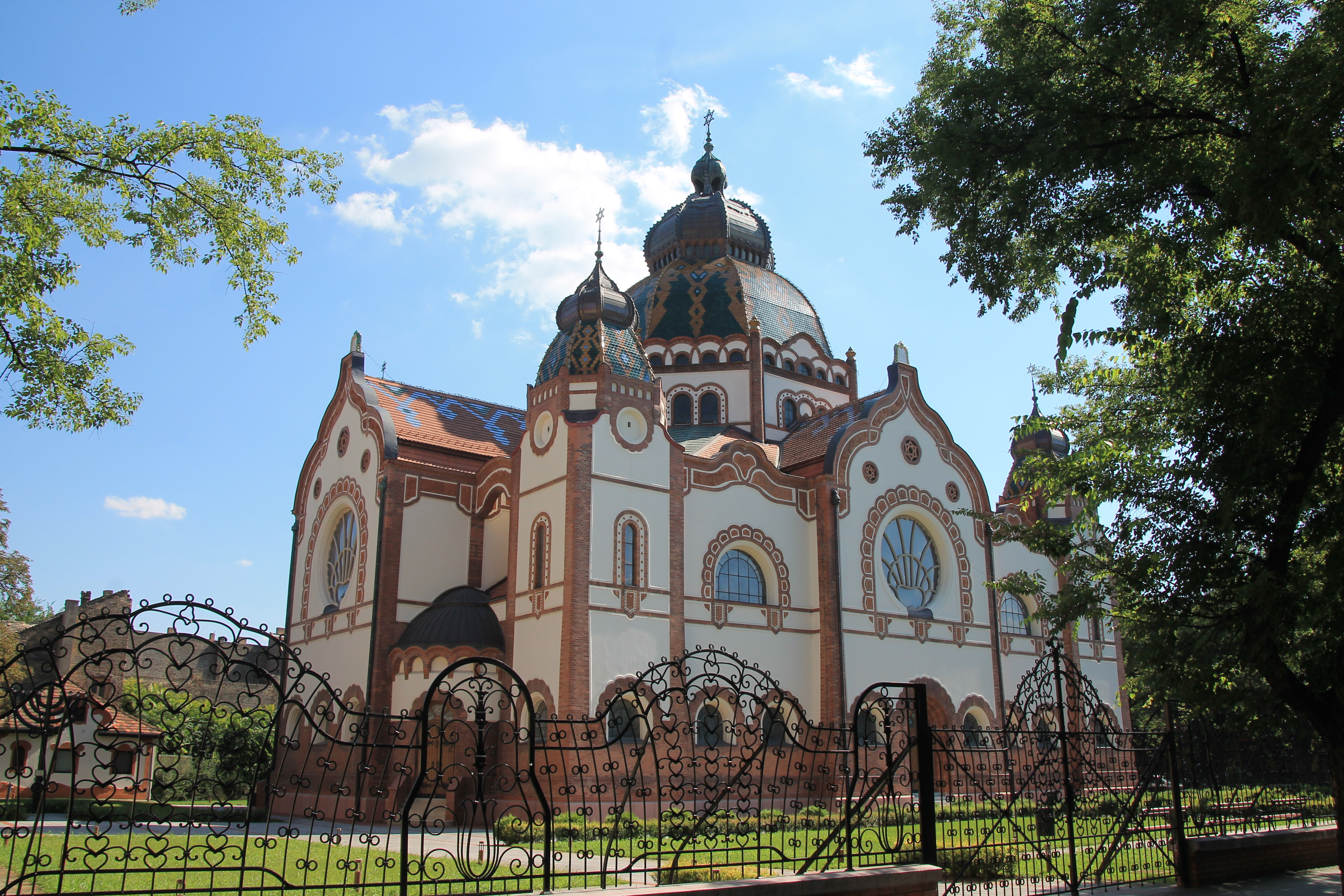
Subotica Synagogue, second largest synagogue building in Europe, repurposed to a cultural venue

According to data from the 2022 census, 709 people declared themselves as Jewish, while 602 stated their religion as Judaism. About half of them live in Belgrade alone, while almost all the rest are found in Vojvodina (especially in its three largest cities: Novi Sad, Subotica, and Pančevo).

Demographic history of Jewish population in Serbia after World War II:

Year	Population
1953	1,504
1961	1,250
1971	1,128
1981	683
1991	1,107
2002 (excl. Kosovo)	1,185
2011 (excl. Kosovo)	787
2022 (excl. Kosovo)	709

Data from 2002 census on ethnic Jews:

City/Region	Population
Belgrade	415
Novi Sad	400
Subotica	89
Pančevo	42
Rest of Serbia	239

Data from 2022 census on Jews by religion:

City/Region	Adherents
Belgrade	365
Novi Sad	66
Subotica	54
Pančevo	22
Rest of Serbia	95

== Notable people ==
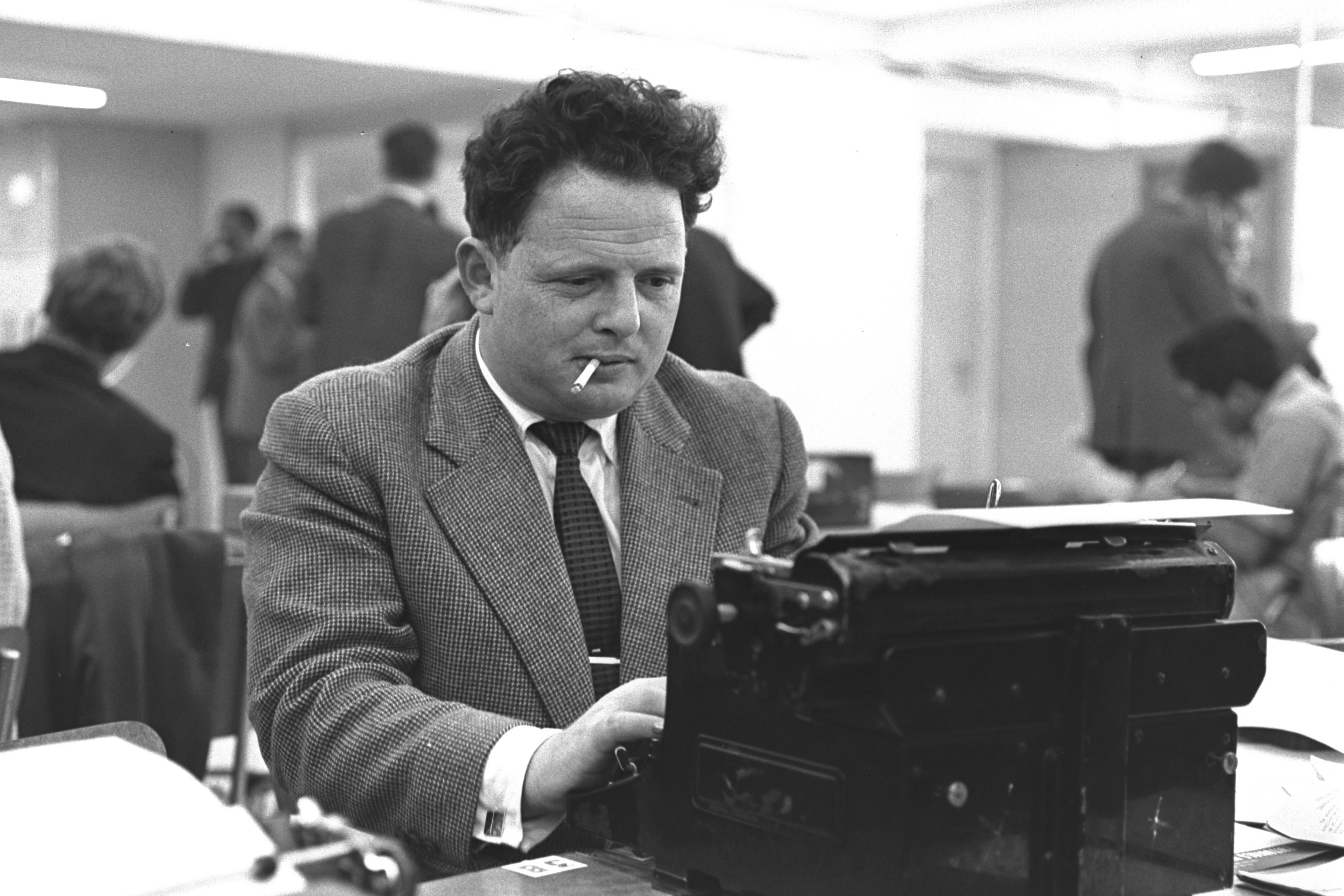
Tommy Lapid, a Serbian-born Israeli radio and television presenter, playwright, journalist, politician, and Minister of Justice

- David Albahari – writer
- David Albala – military officer, physician, diplomat, and Jewish community leader
- Pavle Bihali – politician, leader of the Leviathan Movement
- Albert Bogen – Serbian-born Austrian Olympic silver medalist sabre fencer
- Hilda Dajč – Diarist and Holocaust victim
- Oskar Danon – composer
- Oskar Davičo – poet
- Filip David – playwright
- Marko Đurić – politician minister of foreign affairs since 2024
- Jelena Đurović – writer and journalist
- Predrag Ejdus – actor
- Vanja Ejdus – actress
- Rahela Ferari – actress
- Ivan Ivanji – writer
- Enriko Josif – composer
- Danilo Kiš – writer
- Geca Kon – publisher
- Marko Kon – singer
- Gordana Kuić – writer
- Shaul Ladany – Israeli Olympian athlete
- Tommy Lapid – Israeli politician
- Paulina Lebl-Albala – writer and feminist
- Ženi Lebl – Writer, journalist and historian, chronicler of the Holocaust in the Balkans
- Sonja Licht – political activist
- Lior Narkis – Israeli singer, mother born in Serbia
- Izidor Papo – general, chief surgeon of the Yugoslav People's Army
- Moša Pijade – politician, painter, art critic, and publicist
- Dan Reisinger – Israeli graphic artist
- Seka Sablić – actress
- Erich Šlomović – art collector
- Aleksandar Tišma – writer
- Stanislav Vinaver – writer, poet, translator, and journalist
- Mira Adanja Polak – journalist

== Gallery ==
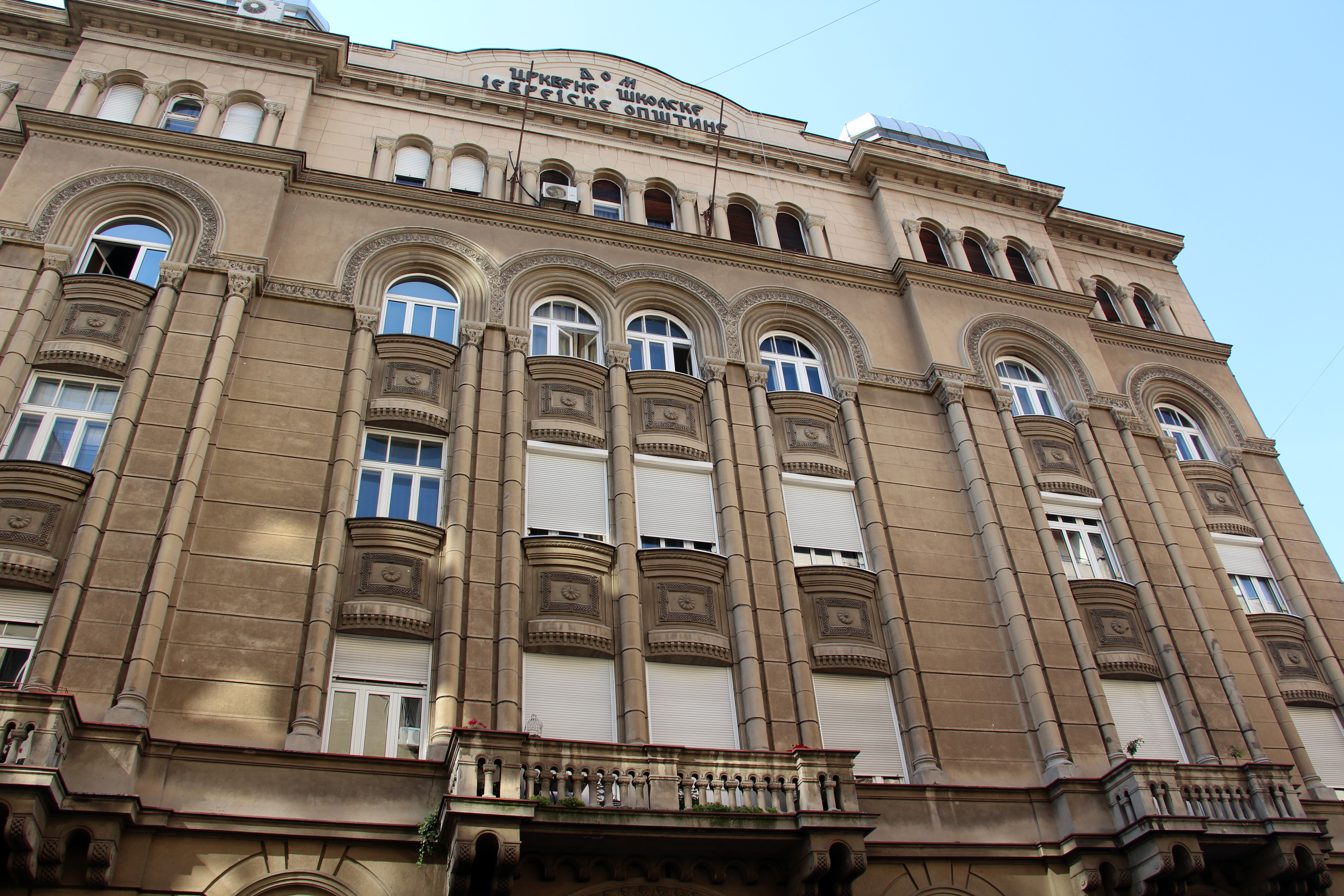
Jewish Historical Museum in Belgrade

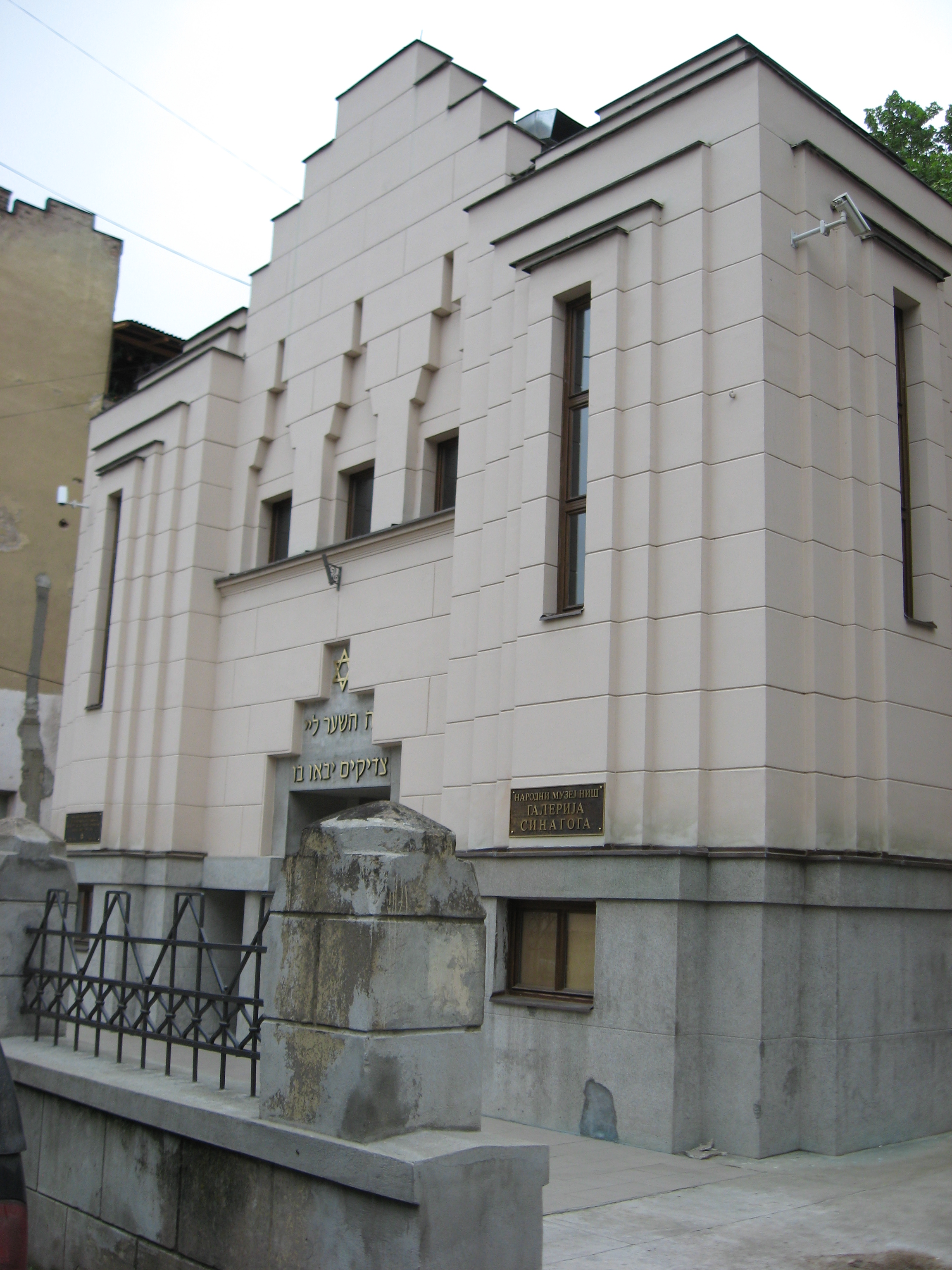
Niš Synagogue, repurposed to a cultural venue

== See also ==
- Jewish diaspora
- Israel–Serbia relations
- List of synagogues in Serbia
- History of the Jews in Belgrade
