= History of the Jews in Belgrade =

Jewish community of Belgrade, Serbia, from the 16th century to the present

Belgrade Jews
Београдски Јевреји יהודי בלגרד
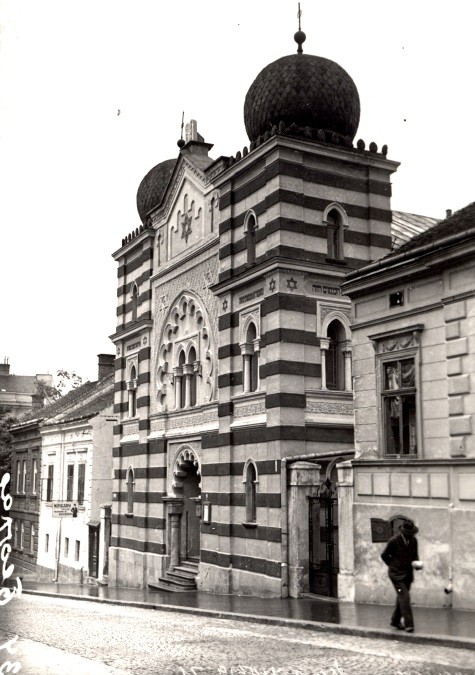
- The Bet Israel Synagogue, Belgrade, c. 1910

Total population
- 295 (2011 census, self-declared) c. 800–1,500 (community estimates, 2016–2022)

Regions with significant populations
- Belgrade, Serbia

Languages
- Serbian; historically Ladino, Hebrew, German, Yiddish

Religion
- Judaism

Related ethnic groups
- Jews of Serbia, Jews of Yugoslavia, Sephardim, Ashkenazim

The history of the Jews in Belgrade spans more than five centuries. A Jewish community has been documented in Belgrade, the capital of Serbia, since at least the 16th century, and secondary evidence suggests a Jewish presence in the city from the mid-14th century. The community reached its greatest size on the eve of the Second World War, numbering about 12,000 in 1940, and more than 90 per cent of its members were killed in the Holocaust.

After the Ottoman conquest of 1521, Jews, mainly Sephardim, settled in growing numbers in Jalija, a quarter on the bank of the Danube in what later became the Dorćol district. In the 17th century Belgrade became a regional centre of Jewish law, with a yeshiva under Rabbi Judah Lerma, and by the 1660s the community numbered about 800. It was destroyed when Habsburg forces took the city in 1688 during the Great Turkish War: the Jewish quarter was plundered and burned, and its inhabitants were marched to distant prison camps. The community was slowly rebuilt after the Ottoman return in 1690, and an organised Ashkenazi congregation is first documented after the Austrian conquest of 1717.

The Serbian Revolution of 1804 brought violence against the community, but under Miloš Obrenović the Jews of Belgrade enjoyed a brief "golden age" of equal rights. These were revoked in 1844 under the Defenders of the Constitution, and despite international pressure following the Congress of Berlin, full equality came only with the constitution of 1888. Zionist activity began at the end of the 19th century, and in 1897 a Belgrade delegate attended the First Zionist Congress. After World War I, migration from smaller communities in the new Kingdom of Serbs, Croats and Slovenes raised the community to about 8,000 by 1931.

After the German invasion of April 1941 Belgrade remained under direct German control. The men were held at the Topovske Šupe camp and shot at Jajinci, Jabuka and Kumodraž; the women and children were held at the Sajmište concentration camp and murdered in gas vans, and by mid-1942 the German security police reported Belgrade to be Judenfrei. Survivors returned after the city's liberation in October 1944, but about 1,000 emigrated to Israel between 1948 and 1952. Under socialist Yugoslavia the community became largely secular and assimilated; after the break-up of Yugoslavia communal and religious life was renewed, and in the late 2010s the community was estimated at between about 800 and 1,500 people.

== History ==
=== In the Middle Ages ===
Evidence for a Jewish community in Belgrade before the Ottoman conquest is sparse and mostly secondary. Scholars have hypothesised the presence of a Romaniote community as early as the 10th century. Isaac Cohen Schlang, the Ashkenazi chief rabbi of Belgrade, argued that the custom among Belgrade's Jews of reading the Book of Esther on 15 Adar rather than 14 Adar, the practice of walled cities, was among the proofs of a community predating the Ottomans. In the mid-14th century, during the reign of Stefan Dušan, Jews are documented as living in the Serbian kingdom, though without specific reference to Belgrade. From the same period it is recorded that Jews in western Europe were accused of spreading the Black Death, and that many fled along the Danube, some reaching Belgrade. In 1374 Louis I of Hungary expelled the Jews of his kingdom, and Jewish families consequently arrived in Belgrade. In 1471 Louis IX, Duke of Bavaria expelled the Jews of Bavaria, and some of the expelled families probably reached the city as well. No primary source attesting to an organised and active community in Belgrade has been found for this period.

Following the Ottoman conquest of 1521, populations were transferred from the conquered territories into the Ottoman interior. Many of those moved were put to forced labour under the Ottoman Turkish designation sürgün, and were employed among other things in the development of Constantinople. A census conducted in Constantinople in 1540 recorded sixteen Jewish families from Belgrade, known collectively as the "Belgrade congregation". Scholars infer from this record that a Jewish community existed in the city before the conquest.

=== Early Ottoman rule ===
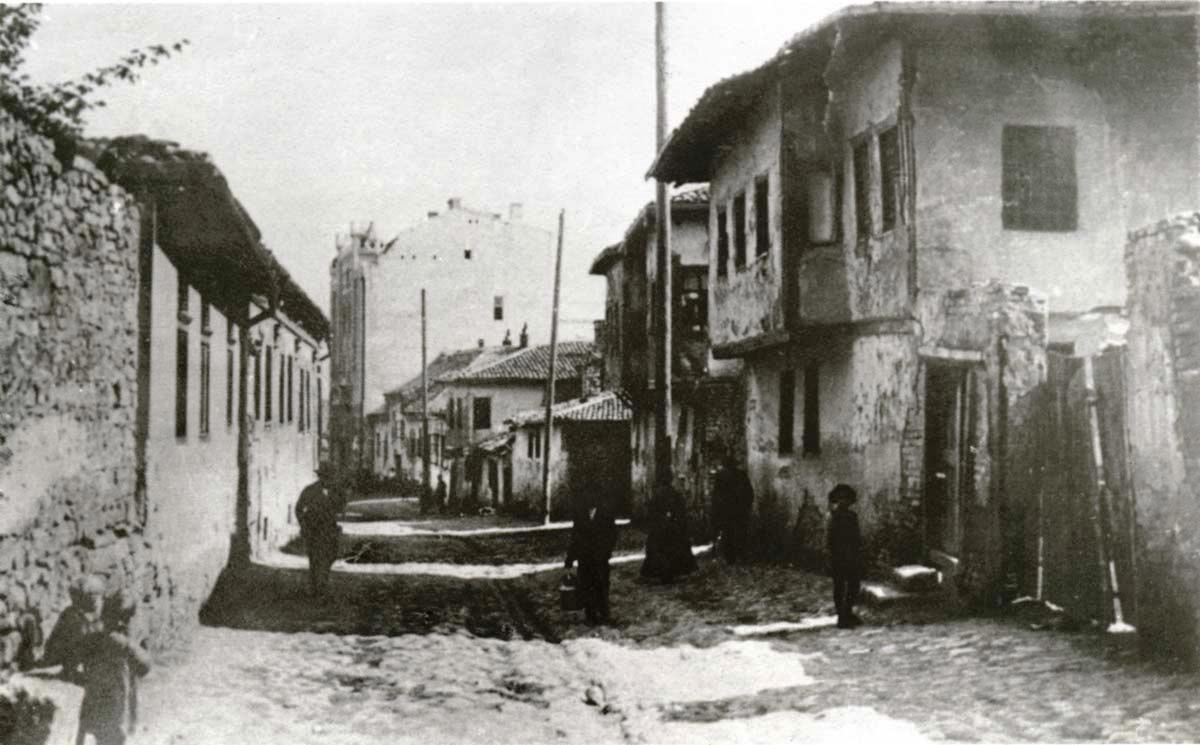
A house on Jews' Street in the Jalija quarter

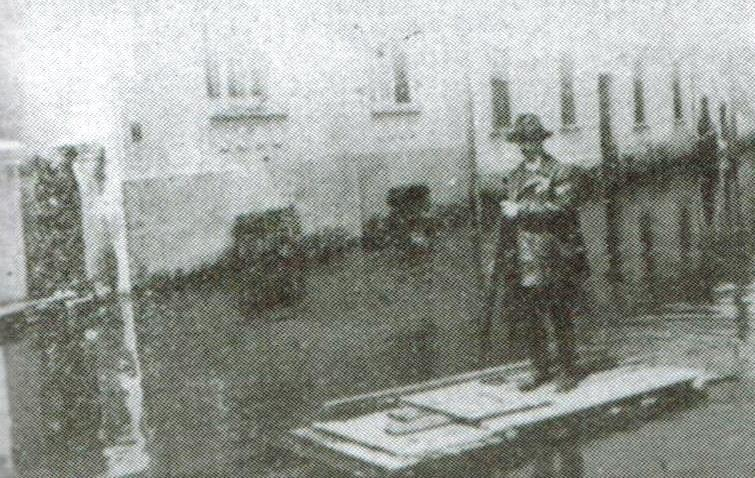
The Jewish quarter during one of the Danube floods

The Ottomans first besieged Belgrade in 1440 and tried for decades to take it without success. On 21 August 1521 the forces of Suleiman the Magnificent captured the city. Jewish merchants and officials arrived together with the Ottoman administrative apparatus and settled near the banks of the Danube, in a quarter called Jalija, from the Turkish yalı, meaning shore. The area later became known as Dorćol. A responsum sent in 1610 to Rabbi Hayyim Shabbethai of Salonica, which describes the Jewish quarter and the date of its establishment in detail, indicates that the quarter already existed and was inhabited by 1540. It was built in the form of a courtyard neighbourhood, but was not separated from the rest of the city by any gate or wall. The houses were generally two storeys high with tiled roofs and probably an attic; their balconies faced the inner courtyard, while their windows also opened onto the outer streets. The quarter stood close to the wall of the Belgrade Fortress and to the Danube, and its residents suffered frequent flooding. A synagogue stood at its centre, with a bathhouse and a Talmud Torah beside it. The land on which the quarter was built was known as miri, short for arazi emiriyye, the ruler's lands, which were imperial property. Residents held only a right of use in return for an annual lease payment, and had no possessory title.

The Ottoman authorities classified the Jews, like the Christians, as dhimmis, but treated them favourably as a minority without national aspirations that was regarded as loyal to the sultan. The community of this period is known from three kinds of source: rabbinic responsa, Ottoman records and the accounts of European travellers. Between the 1550s and the 1660s these travellers describe a Jewish quarter close to the fortress, with a synagogue and a school of its own, Jewish merchants active in the city's trade, and by 1620 some 60 to 70 Jewish households.

Questions sent in 1546 to Joseph ibn Lev, Samuel de Medina, Samuel Kalai and David ibn Abi Zimra indicate that five judges sat on the rabbinical court of Belgrade, a figure that points to the size of the community. They further suggest that there were at least two separate congregations, since one of the judges described himself as belonging to the "Shalom congregation" while the others did not. It is recorded that a number of Jews taken captive by the forces of Bohdan Khmelnytsky during the Khmelnytsky Uprising were brought to Belgrade and offered for sale into slavery, and were ransomed by members of the community.

=== Destruction and renewal of the community (1688–1717) ===
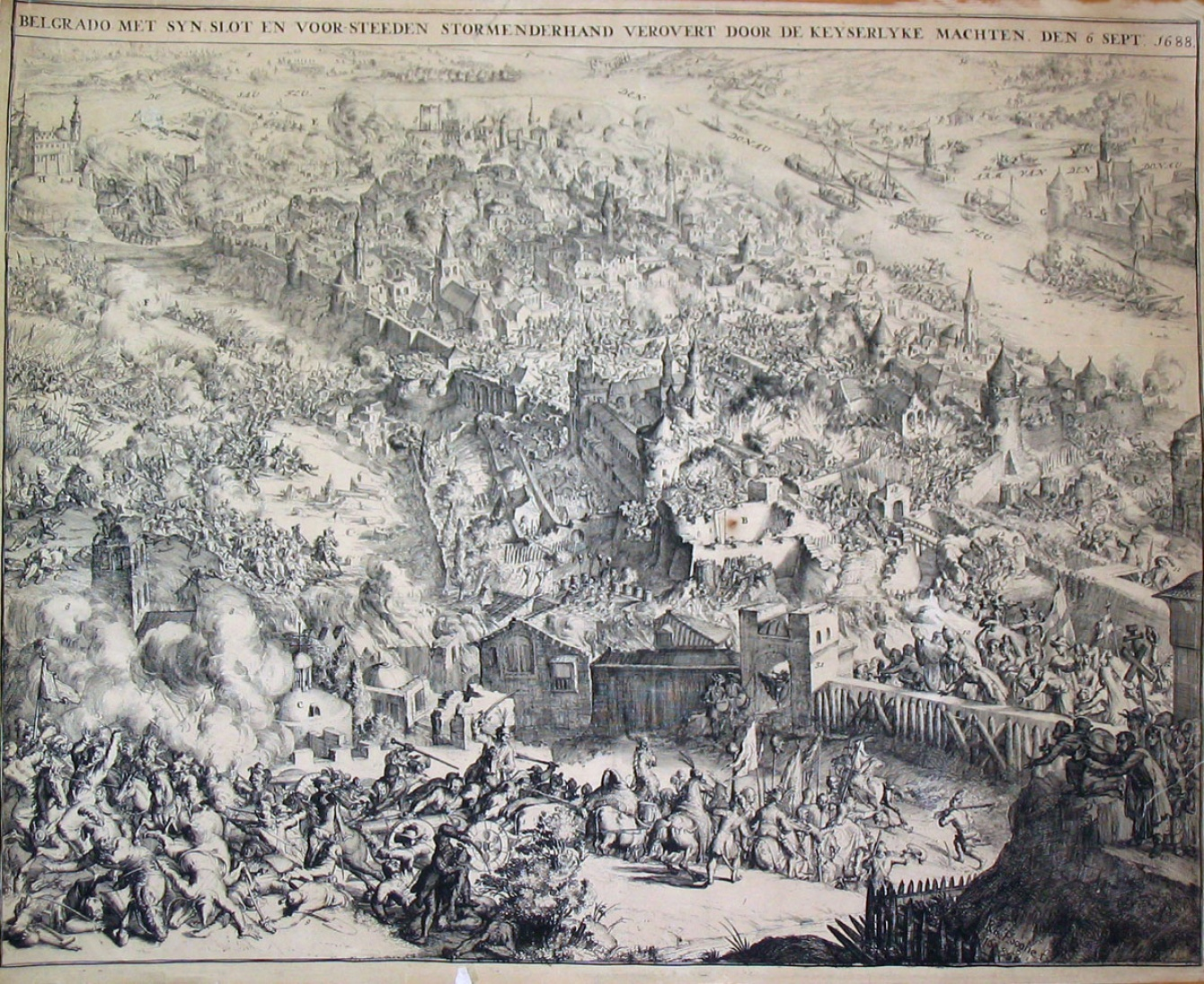
The capture of Belgrade on 6 September 1688, engraving by Romeyn de Hooghe

On 6 September 1688, during the Great Turkish War, the army of the Habsburg monarchy under Maximilian II Emanuel, Elector of Bavaria took Belgrade after a siege of a month. The Jewish community then numbered about 800 people, of whom between 100 and 150 fled the city before it fell. The Austrians looted the synagogue and burned it down, and went on to plunder the houses and businesses of the Jewish quarter. The Ottomans who remained in the city and the members of the Jewish community were put to forced labour, clearing the bodies of the dead and removing rubble from the streets. When this work ended, the entire community was arrested. About 600 were marched some 180 kilometres to a detention camp beside the Tvrđa fortress in Osijek, some of them naked or half naked, and were imprisoned there in irons. Half of the deportees survived the march and the conditions of their captivity until ransom money arrived. About 45 others, among them the chief rabbi Joseph Almosnino together with the community's notables and wealthiest members, were taken to a camp at Nikolsburg, where Almosnino died.

Questions addressed to Rabbi Moses ibn Habib indicate that a bitter dispute arose both among the captives and among the communities raising their ransom. Some of those collecting funds worked only for the release of the group of 45. The ransom the Austrians demanded for the group of 600 was four times as high per person as that demanded for the 45, because some members of the larger group had placed sums of money and jewellery in safekeeping in advance. Some captives acted independently to secure their own release rather than through the group. Books and letters circulated by the redeemed captives after their release describe their suffering at length; one such account opens: "The mouth that speaks with a broken spirit, says the bitter and sighing one, a heart broken and crushed, crying out and weeping, over the troubles of the time that have befallen me. I am the man that hath seen affliction, one of the exiles of Belgrade."

Three hundred of the captives were ransomed by the Jews of Vienna. After their release they travelled by way of Prague and dispersed from there. Many of the community's wealthy and educated members never returned to Belgrade, settling instead in Venice, Amsterdam and London. On 14 October 1690, after a siege of twelve days, the Ottomans retook Belgrade. A handful of Jews returned with them and the rebuilding of the community began. In 1692 Samuel Pinto of Salonica was appointed rabbi of the community. By the beginning of the 18th century it numbered 250 people, who were involved in the economic, administrative and political life of the city. Abraham Alboher of Belgrade served as the personal assistant and interpreter of the French ambassador to the Ottoman Empire, and on his behalf conducted contacts with Francis II Rákóczi, who later led a revolt against Habsburg rule in Hungary.

=== Under the Habsburg monarchy, 1717–1739 ===
The Habsburg army besieged Belgrade again in July 1717, during the Austro-Turkish War of 1716–1718. The shelling heavily damaged the Jewish quarter and the synagogue and caused casualties in the community, and after the city fell on 17 August some members left for the Ottoman interior, among them merchants who settled with their families at Čepino Banya, now part of Velingrad in Bulgaria. Under Austrian rule, confirmed by the Treaty of Passarowitz in 1718, an organised Ashkenazi congregation with its own chief rabbi is documented in the city for the first time, while the Sephardim split into two congregations after an internal dispute.

Habsburg rule was harsh towards the Jews of the city. The Austrians distinguished between Ashkenazi Jews, most of whom were not Ottoman subjects, and Sephardi Jews, who were. The Ashkenazi congregation was granted no right of permanent residence apart from a few individuals, and its members lived under a standing threat of expulsion, whereas Ottoman subjects held certain trading and residence rights under the capitulations. In 1720, 33 families holding Ottoman nationality were counted in Belgrade. The city's Jews lived in two principal courtyard quarters: the "courtyard of the Ashkenazi Jews", with 47 rooms, and the "Jewish house" of the Sephardim, with 103. David Meir headed the Sephardi congregation and Samson Frenkel the Ashkenazi one.

Under the Belgrade Administration headed by Charles Alexander, Duke of Württemberg, the city was rebuilt and its trade with the Ottoman Empire expanded. In 1732 he appointed Joseph Süß Oppenheimer as the administration's financial director. After Oppenheimer's fall and execution the authorities hardened their treatment of the community considerably, restricting its freedom of movement and occupation, imposing special taxes, confiscating property and banning sales to non-Jews; Catholic missionary activity is also documented, and some Jews were compelled to convert.

=== Decline of Ottoman rule ===
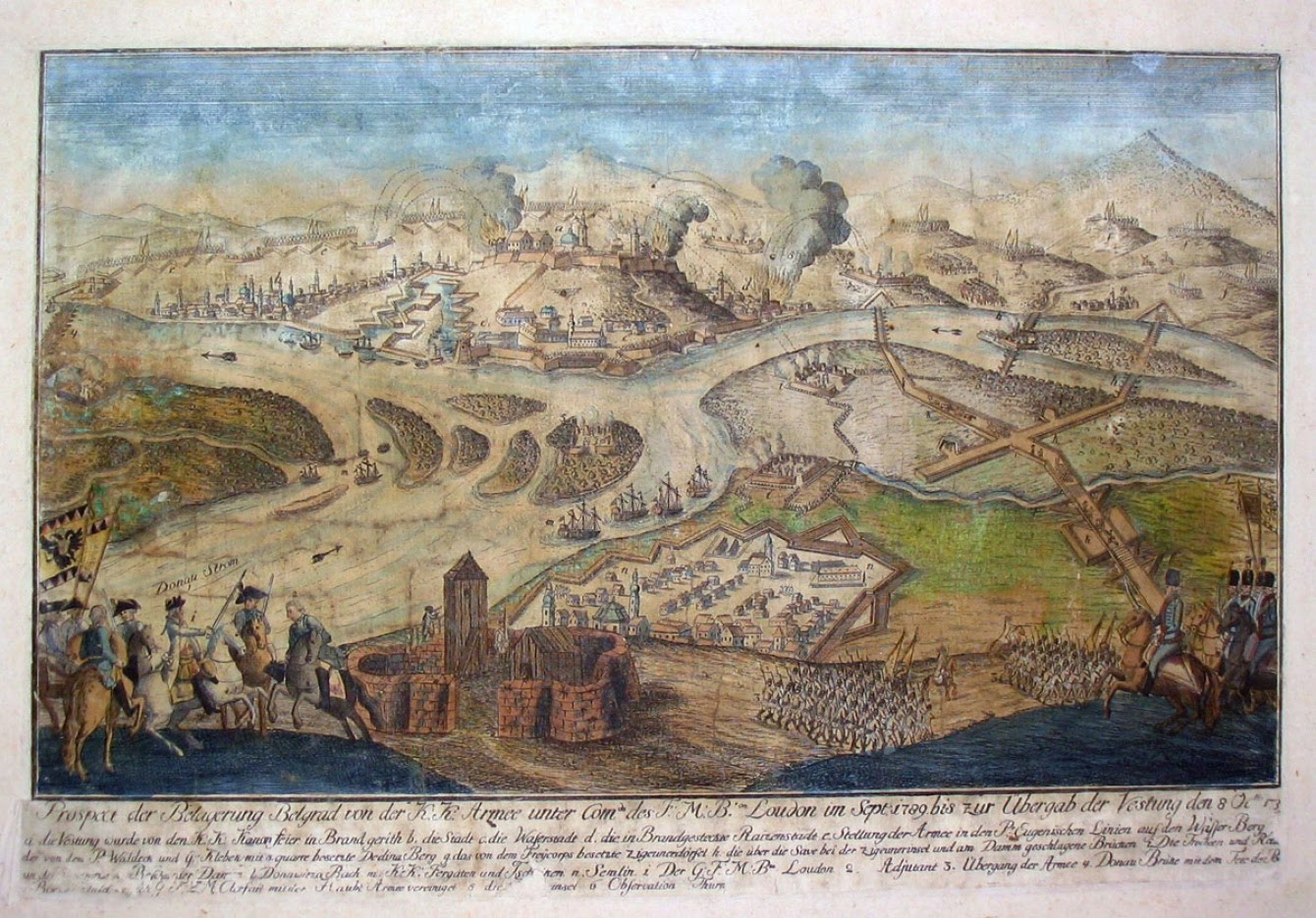
The capture of Belgrade in 1789

In July 1739, during the Austro-Russian–Turkish War, the Ottomans laid siege to Belgrade and retook it after 51 days. In 1785 a fire broke out in the city in which the synagogue burned down completely and the Jewish quarter was severely damaged. Rabbinic rulings concerning the release of deserted wives, together with records of charitable relief organised in other communities, indicate that the number of casualties in the fire was large. On 15 September 1789, during the Austro-Turkish War (1788–1791), the Habsburg army under Ernst Gideon von Laudon besieged Belgrade and captured it on 8 October. Some members of the community left with the retreating Ottomans, while others fled to the surrounding villages, where they were caught and taken prisoner by the Austrian army. Some of those seized were executed on suspicion of spying for the Ottomans and others were imprisoned..

Under the agreements that ended the war the Ottomans regained Belgrade without a battle. On their return the local vali imprisoned the chief rabbi, Azriel Yehiel Migriso, together with the seven members of the rabbinical court, and Migriso died in prison. An outbreak of plague in 1794 killed several dozen Jews, among them his son and successor Joshua Raphael Migriso, and Jews were among those killed when Janissary troops rioted in the city in 1795.

=== Under Serbian rule ===
==== The Serbian Revolution and the reign of Miloš Obrenović (1804–1839) ====
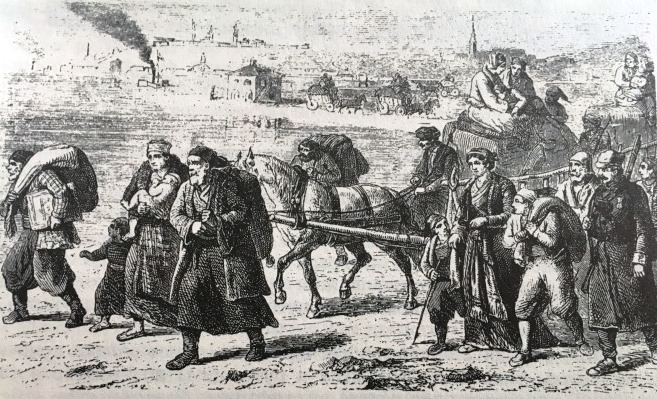
Sephardi Jews fleeing from Belgrade to Zemun in 1862 after the city was shelled from the Belgrade Fortress, drawing by Felix Philipp Kanitz

The Serbian Revolution broke out in 1804. Rebel bands under Karađorđe attacked towns and villages across Serbia, killing Turkish and Jewish inhabitants whom they regarded as Ottoman agents, and many Jewish refugees reached Belgrade. When the rebels took the city on 12 December 1806 they attacked the Jewish quarter, looting property, killing several Jews and holding others for ransom; in January 1807, after a large sum was paid, 182 women, children and elderly people were allowed to leave for Zemun. A two-day pogrom against the Jews and Turks of Belgrade followed on 7 March 1807, in which dozens were killed and many were forced to convert, and hundreds of Jews were then expelled to Bulgaria, Bosnia and Austrian territory. When the refugees complained to Andrey Razumovsky, the Russian ambassador in Vienna, the Serbian command replied that the Jews had been harmed because they were Ottoman agents.

The Serbian Revolution broke out in 1804. Rebel bands under Karađorđe attacked towns and villages across Serbia, killing Turkish and Jewish inhabitants whom they regarded as Ottoman agents, and many Jewish refugees reached Belgrade. When the rebels took the city on 12 December 1806 they attacked the Jewish quarter, looting property, killing several Jews and holding others for ransom; in January 1807, after a large sum was paid, 182 women, children and elderly people were allowed to leave for Zemun. A two-day pogrom against the Jews and Turks of Belgrade followed on 7 March 1807, in which dozens were killed and many were forced to convert, and hundreds of Jews were then expelled to Bulgaria, Bosnia and Austrian territory. When the refugees complained to Andrey Razumovsky, the Russian ambassador in Vienna, the Serbian command replied that the Jews had been harmed because they were Ottoman agents.

==== Restriction and repeal of rights (1839–1868) ====
In 1839 Miloš Obrenović was forced to relinquish power under pressure from an opposition drawn from the Serbian economic elite, which objected among other things to the equality of rights he had introduced, and which became known as the Defenders of the Constitution. The new elite undertook to curtail the rights of the Jews of Serbia, and in 1842 succeeded in having Alexander Karađorđević appointed prince. The new government took severe measures against the Jews. In 1844 equality of rights was abolished along with freedom of movement and residence. Jews were expelled from the newer quarters of Belgrade and concentrated in the Jewish quarter, and a further decree barred them from living in provincial towns. Emigration to Budapest, Vienna, Paris, London and Palestine followed.

The Treaty of Paris of 1856 made European backing for Serbian autonomy conditional on freedom of worship, residence and trade for citizens of all religions, and the community's leaders petitioned the state council repeatedly in its spirit. Prince Alexander allowed the Jews of Belgrade to live anywhere in the city but conceded nothing further, and in April 1858 they told him that 285 of the city's 300 Jewish families lived in severe poverty because of the restrictions. Miloš Obrenović, restored at the end of that year, abolished all restrictions on the Jews of Serbia in September 1859 against the will of parliament, but after his death parliament repealed the decree in February 1861, and appeals to his successor Mihailo Obrenović failed.

In June 1862 clashes between Ottoman police and Serbian residents ended with the Ottoman garrison shelling the city from the fortress on 17 June. The Jewish quarter and the "Old Congregation" synagogue were badly damaged, and some 50 inhabitants of Belgrade, Jews among them, were killed. Between 400 and 500 Jewish families fled to Austrian-ruled Zemun, where their plight drew wide coverage in the Jewish press and relief funds, among others from the Rothschild family. Most returned in early 1863 to find their surviving houses looted, and 121 heads of family petitioned Prince Mihailo either to grant them equal rights or to expel them from Serbia. When he did not answer, the community turned to foreign help: its leaders met Moses Montefiore in Zemun, Adolphe Crémieux of the Alliance Israélite Universelle enlisted the French consul, and Britain pressed Serbia through the Sublime Porte and the Russian government.

==== Emancipation and the beginnings of Zionism (1868–1913) ====
A draft constitution of 1869 that granted equal rights to minorities, Jews included, was stripped of its Jewish clauses under pressure from the Serbian economic elite, although Jews were made subject to conscription from 1870. Serbia undertook to lift its anti-Jewish regulations after the war of 1876, and again at the Congress of Berlin in 1878 under pressure from Otto von Bismarck, but delayed implementation on various pretexts until the constitution of 1888 granted full equality to the Jews of Serbia, most of whom lived in Belgrade.

Towards the end of the 19th century Zionist activity began in Belgrade, while antisemitism grew more pronounced and found expression in the press and in various published books. Rabbi Judah Alkalai founded a Belgrade branch of the Society for the Settlement of the Land of Israel. In 1885 Ruben Bierer, a member of Hovevei Zion, arrived in Belgrade, served as personal physician to King Milan I and advocated establishing a Hovevei Zion branch in the city; his activity displeased the Serbian authorities and he was dismissed and obliged to leave. In response to the growth of antisemitism the chief rabbi Simon Bernfeld met the Serbian prime minister Jovan Ristić and subsequently the regent Kosta Protić, and was assured that the Serbian government would safeguard the rights of the Jewish community.

In 1897 David Alkalai represented the Jews of Serbia at the First Zionist Congress in Basel, and on his return founded the Zion society and the youth association Gideon. In 1912 Bencion Buli became the first Jew elected to the Serbian parliament. In the First Balkan War some 12 per cent of the community enlisted in the Serbian army, encouraged by the chief rabbis Isaac Alcalay and Isaac Cohen Schlang, and the Sephardi and Ashkenazi communities funded military hospitals of 100 and 40 beds respectively. After the Second Balkan War the Serbian authorities sent delegations of Belgrade Jews, headed by Alcalay and David Albala, to Bitola and Skopje to win over the Ladino-speaking communities of newly annexed Vardar Macedonia.

=== World War I and its aftermath ===
During World War I Belgrade was bombarded and, after the Central Powers overran Serbia, many of the community's leading members were deported by the Austro-Hungarian authorities to internment camps in Hungary. Bencion Buli sat as the Jewish representative in the Serbian parliament in exile on Corfu, and David Albala was sent to the United States to lobby the American government and American Jewish leaders on Serbia's behalf; his contacts with the government in exile led to Serbia becoming the first state to recognise the Balfour Declaration. About 130 Belgrade Jews, some 4 per cent of the community, were killed serving in the Serbian army during the Balkan Wars and the First World War. In the new Kingdom of Serbs, Croats and Slovenes the Jews were recognised as a single religious body whose individual communities managed their own affairs; the Federation of Jewish Religious Communities of Yugoslavia was founded under Hugo Spitzer in 1919, Friedrich Pops became deputy mayor of Belgrade in 1920, and the Association of Rabbis of Yugoslavia was founded under Isaac Alcalay in 1923.

After the Balkan Wars and the First World War, Jews from Macedonia, most of them from Bitola, settled in Fišeklija, a commercial area on the outskirts of Belgrade, where they lived crowded into abandoned workshops and made a living from petty trade and peddling; the area became a slum. In 1927 Šemaja Demajo was elected to the house of representatives, and in March 1928 Nahum Sokolow visited Belgrade to campaign for Zionism and Keren Hayesod. King Alexander later appointed Isaac Alcalay to the Senate, where he was the only Jewish member of the upper house.

In July 1939 the government of Dragiša Cvetković issued regulations for the expulsion of Jews living in Yugoslavia without its citizenship. In 1940 the Sephardi community of Belgrade numbered about 9,000 people and the Ashkenazi community about 3,000. As Yugoslavia drew closer to Nazi Germany, the education minister Anton Korošec introduced unofficial restrictions on the admission of Jews to schools in August 1940, and on 4 October official regulations limited Jewish economic activity, imposed a numerus clausus in higher education and barred Jews from certain occupations. The laws were sharply criticised by the Yugoslav intellectual elite. Jews were further restricted in conscription and officer training, Isaac Alcalay was forced to resign from the senate, and antisemitic articles appeared in the press. After Yugoslavia joined the Tripartite Pact on 25 March 1941 and the military coup two days later, schooling and communal activity ceased throughout the kingdom.

=== World War II and the Holocaust in Belgrade ===
==== Occupation ====
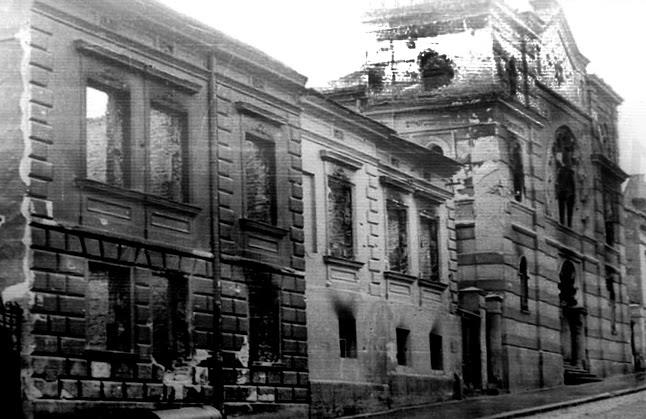
The Bet Israel Synagogue in Belgrade, damaged in the German bombing, April 1941

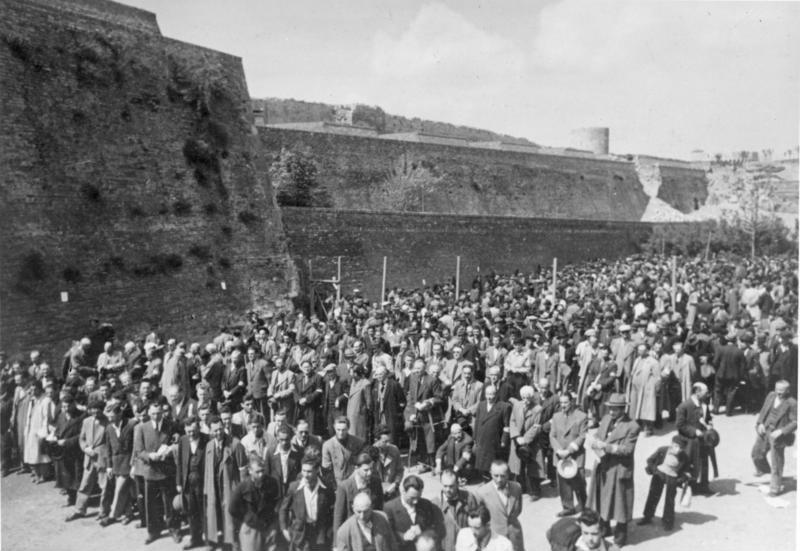
Jews of Belgrade in the courtyard of the Belgrade police headquarters, reporting for forced labour, April 1941

Germany invaded Yugoslavia on 6 April 1941. The Luftwaffe bombing of Belgrade badly damaged Dorćol and destroyed the Fišeklija slum, and the city fell on 12 April. Serbia was placed under a German military government, with a civil administration headed by Harald Turner; Wilhelm Fuchs commanded the Einsatzgruppe in Serbia, Franz Neuhausen took charge of the economy, including Jewish property, and a team of the Rosenberg Staff seized the community's cultural assets. The collaborationist governments of Milan Aćimović and later Milan Nedić set up a Special Police for Jewish Affairs, and Dragomir Jovanović, head of the internal security police, was among the most prominent collaborators.

==== Persecution and plunder ====
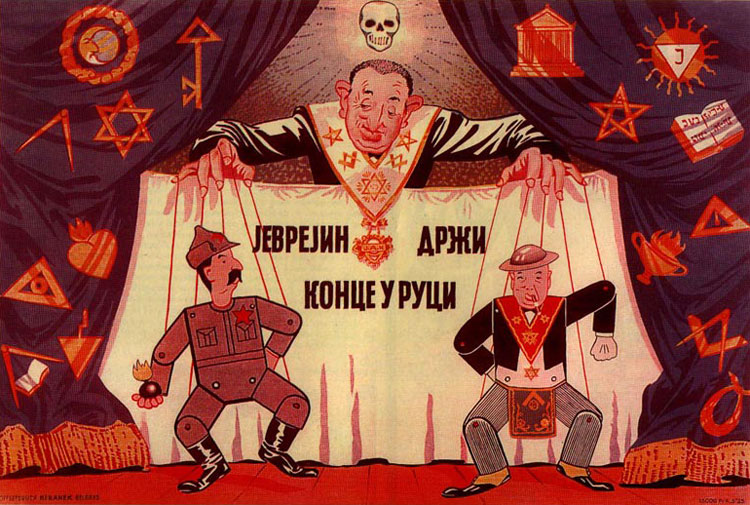
An antisemitic poster distributed in Belgrade under German occupation, presenting Stalin and Churchill as agents of the Jews and the Freemasons

The destruction of Belgrade's Jews proceeded in three stages. Between April and August 1941 their property was seized and they were subjected to registration, forced labour and restrictions on movement; between August and November the men were interned at Topovske Šupe and shot; and between December 1941 and May 1942 the women and children were held at Sajmište and killed in gas vans. The Germans were assisted by local Volksdeutsche and by the Serbian collaborationist authorities.

On 16 April the Jews of Belgrade were ordered to register with the police on pain of death. The size of the community at that point is uncertain: a community register of late 1940 recorded 10,388 Jews in the city, and a nominal list prepared in January 1941 and passed to the occupation authorities recorded 11,870. (Note: Only a small number of sources give the number of Jews in Belgrade in 1941, and the figures range from 10,000 to 12,000. The sources differ as to whether refugees from outside Yugoslavia are included in these totals or should be added to them, and the community's own records, including those of the Sephardi community, give varying figures. The historian Harriet Pass Freidenreich gives 10,388 Jews in Belgrade, and the historian Jaša Romano gives 11,500. Menachem Shelah holds that the figure of 11,870 excludes Jews who had converted and those in mixed marriages who were not registered as Jews in the censuses, but who were nonetheless killed by the Nazis under the race laws. The destruction of the evidence of the murder of Belgrade's Jews, carried out by the Germans under Sonderaktion 1005, has left the uncertainty unresolved.) In the event 9,145 registered and were required to wear a yellow armband marked "Jew"; those who did not had been killed in the bombing, had fled, or chose to stay away. A curfew and restrictions on buying food followed. Administrators drawn mainly from the Volksdeutsche were appointed to Jewish businesses, which they looted before forcing the owners to sell to them at negligible prices; the proceeds were paid into an account controlled by Neuhausen, and Jewish bank accounts and savings were closed to their owners.

From 21 April Jewish men and women were conscripted for forced labour, clearing bodies and rubble from the bombing by hand, often under abuse from German soldiers. The community's leaders were arrested, and the Ashkenazi chief rabbi Isaac Cohen Schlang and the community president Friedrich Pops were among those taken to Graz. Some 2,100 Jews from the Serbian Banat were brought to Belgrade and quartered in Jewish homes and communal buildings. A few Jewish informers worked for the Gestapo, luring dozens of Jews with promises of forged passports and handing them over; two were later declared war criminals.

==== The murder of the men ====
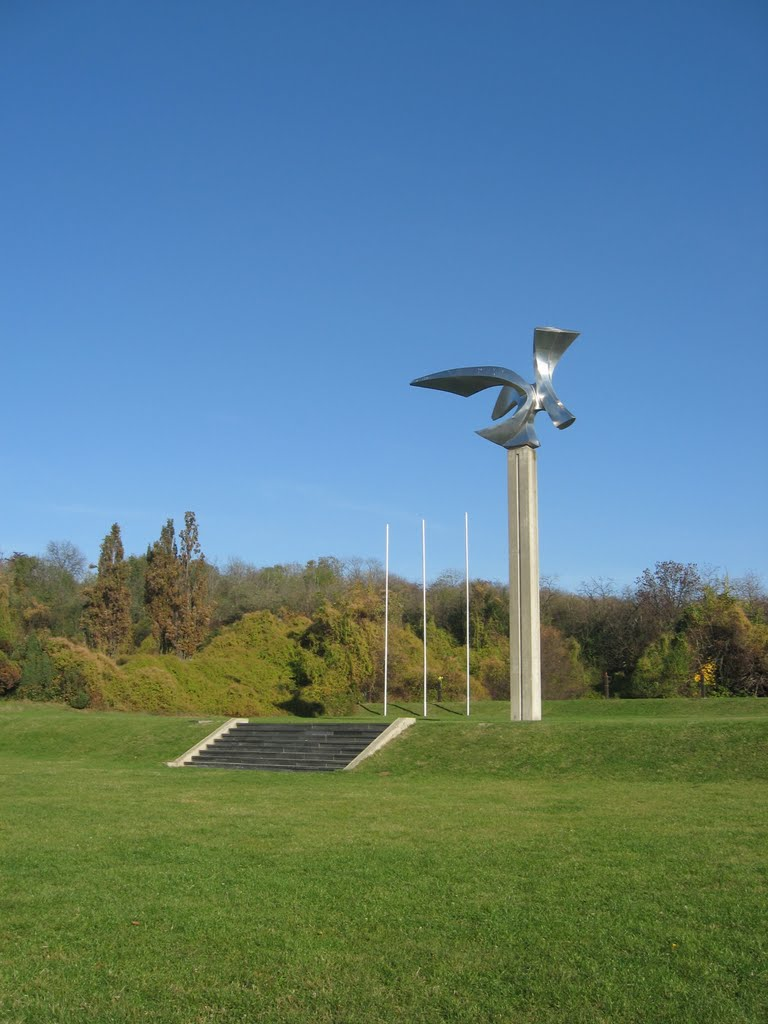
The Jajinci Memorial Park monument

The killings began in July 1941, when the Germans answered the start of partisan activity with a reprisal quota of 100 civilians executed for every German soldier killed and 50 for every one wounded, taken from both the Jewish and the Serbian population. After a young Jew, Elias Emil Almozlino, threw a Molotov cocktail at a German military car on 27 July without causing casualties, 122 Jewish men were selected and shot at the military firing range at Jajinci, a group later remembered as "the first hundred". Jewish and Serbian prisoners were held from July at the Banjica concentration camp, and on 20 August the Topovske Šupe camp was opened for Jewish men from Belgrade and the Banat. From September its prisoners were shot at Jajinci, Jabuka and Kumodraž at a rate of 150 to 400 a day.

After partisans killed 22 German soldiers near Topola on 2 October, 2,000 Jews and 200 Roma were shot between 9 and 11 October. Reporting on the executions, Turner acknowledged that there was no real justification for the reprisal ratio, but noted that Jews were more readily available than Serbs and that the killings served the solution of the "Jewish problem". By late October, according to Franz Rademacher of the German Foreign Office, half of the 8,000 men arrested were dead and most of the rest were to be shot within a week, while 500 were kept alive to build a camp for the women and children.

==== The murder of the women and children ====
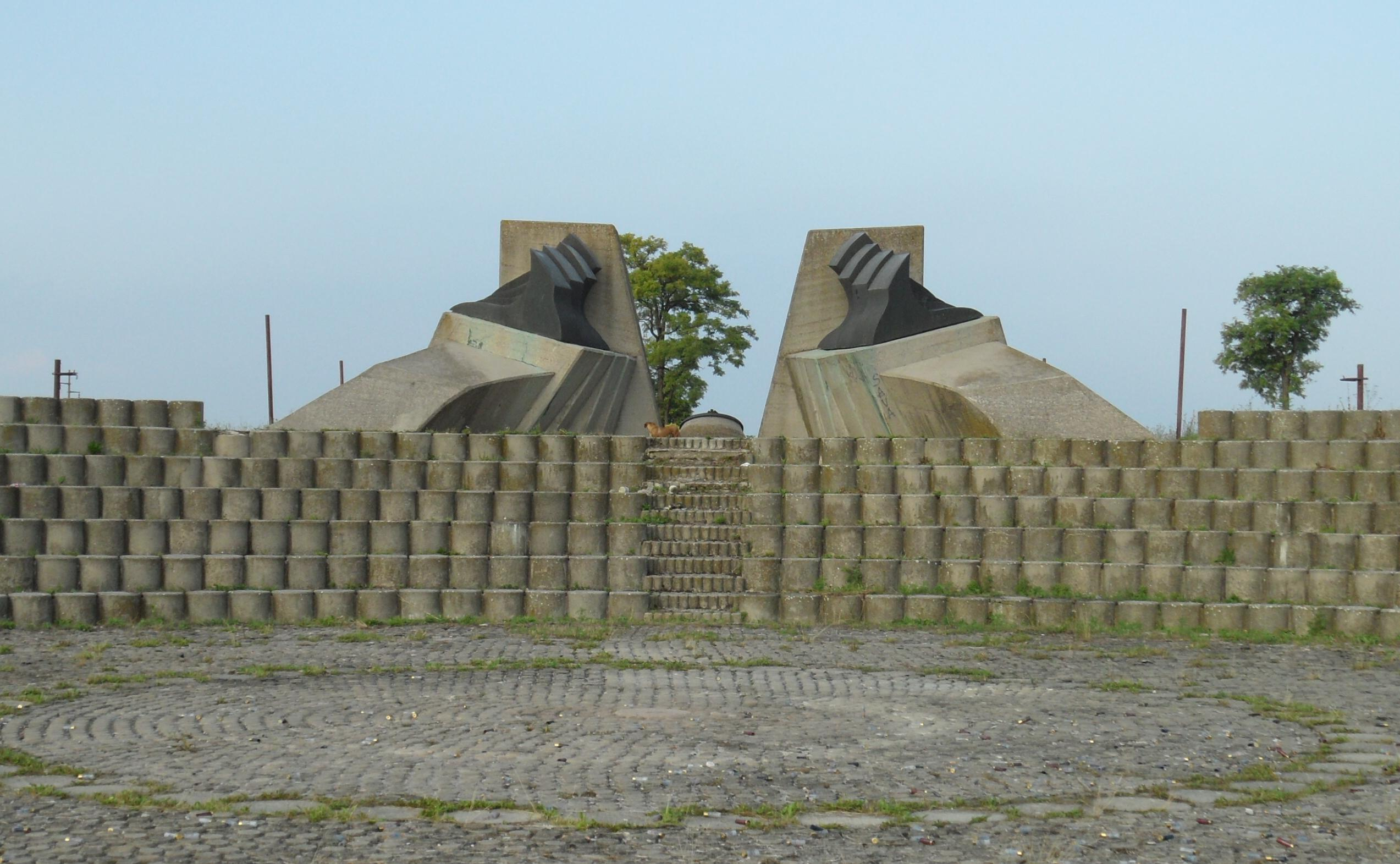
The memorial at Jabuka

The camp was set up in the pavilions of the international fairground at Sajmište, on the outskirts of the city but within the Independent State of Croatia, whose authorities agreed on condition that it be under German rather than Serbian supervision. On 7 December 1941 the women and children of Belgrade were summoned to report to the security police; by 12 December most had been taken by lorry to Sajmište, commanded by Herbert Andorfer, and by 26 December it held 6,870 prisoners. The women and children of the Kladovo–Šabac group were brought there in January 1942. In early March a Saurer gas van arrived from Germany. On the orders of Emanuel Schäfer, head of the German security services in Serbia, it was used twice a day, each time killing about 100 people during a half-hour drive through Belgrade, and the bodies were buried at Jajinci. Its last journey, on 10 May 1942, killed the last of the Jews held at Sajmište. Schäfer then reported that the Jewish problem no longer existed in Serbia and that Belgrade was the first large city in Europe to have become Judenfrei.

Between December 1943 and June 1944 a unit of Sonderaktion 1005 under Paul Blobel exhumed and burned the bodies at Jajinci, Kumodraž and Jabuka. The 100 Jewish prisoners forced to do the work were almost all shot on its completion; three escaped.

==== Resistance, survival and liberation ====
The grave of the Baruh siblings in the Avenue of the People's Heroes of Yugoslavia at the Belgrade New Cemetery

Some of Belgrade's Jews fought with the Yugoslav Partisans, among them the three Baruh brothers, Isidor, Bora and Josif, all of whom were killed.

Of the Jews of Belgrade, 1,115 survived, 9.3 per cent of the pre-war community, a low proportion compared with the rest of Yugoslavia outside Macedonia. The severity of the occupation regime, the speed of the killings, the difficulty of escaping from Serbia to other occupation zones and the harsh repression of the Serbian population itself all left little room for rescue. Most of those who escaped did so on their own or with the community's help while that was still possible, chiefly with forged documents. Of 300 who fled to Skopje, 60 were handed over by the Bulgarian police and executed at Banjica, while 240 reached Albania and survived in hiding. Several hundred more were sheltered by Serbs or joined the partisans, and 20 women married to Serbian or German spouses were released from Sajmište. The priest Andrej Tumpej, who provided Jews in Belgrade with false identity papers, was recognised by Yad Vashem as Righteous Among the Nations in 2001.

Belgrade was liberated in October 1944. Before withdrawing, the Germans blew up the Sephardi Bet Israel Synagogue; the Ashkenazi Sukkat Shalom had been used as a brothel, and the Jewish cemetery had been desecrated.

=== From the end of World War II to the early 21st century ===
After the war a special court tried German officers and members of the Nedić government for war crimes, and many of them, among them Harald Turner, Wilhelm Fuchs and Dragomir Jovanović, were sentenced to death and executed; Franz Neuhausen received 20 years and was released after several. Others long escaped justice: Herbert Andorfer, the commandant of Sajmište, fled to Venezuela and evaded trial until the late 1960s, and Emanuel Schäfer, arrested in West Germany in 1951, was sentenced in 1953 to six and a half years' imprisonment.

Survivors returned to Belgrade, and with arrivals from smaller settlements the number of Jews in the city approached 1,500. Professor Albert Vajs, who from 1948 headed both the Federation of Jewish Communities of Yugoslavia and the Belgrade community, led the rebuilding of communal institutions with aid from the Joint and UNRRA, and initiated the founding of the Jewish Historical Museum. After the Yugoslav authorities permitted free emigration in June 1948, about 1,000 of Belgrade's Jews left for Israel by the end of 1952. Memorials followed in 1950 at the Military Medical Academy, to the community's doctors and nurses who had served with the partisans, and in 1952 in the Jewish section of the Belgrade New Cemetery, to the victims of the Holocaust and the Jewish partisans. After Vajs's death, Lavoslav Kadelburg succeeded him as president of the federation and held the post for many years.

Emigration and assimilation steadily reduced the community; in 2016 about 800 Jews were counted in Belgrade, more than 90 per cent of them married to non-Jewish spouses and many of them elderly. In 1995 a sculpture by Nandor Glid commemorating the community destroyed in the Holocaust was erected on the bank of the Danube. In the early 21st century the community renovated the synagogue and built a kosher kitchen and function hall, and a Chabad house in the city centre serves as Belgrade's Orthodox synagogue, with a mikveh, an educational centre for children and a kosher kitchen.

In 2017 Danilo Medić was elected president of the Jewish community of Belgrade as the only candidate. His tenure brought him into conflict with the Federation of Jewish Communities of Serbia and the chief rabbi Isak Asiel, and a rival group of community members sought to remove him; the dispute, which the Serbian press attributed largely to financial considerations, was widely reported.

== Demographics ==
Numerical data on the Jews of Belgrade are available from the Ottoman period onwards. At the end of the 16th century a few dozen Jews lived in the city, and during the 17th century, as the community developed, acquired a secure economic position and became a regional centre of Jewish law, its numbers grew rapidly; 800 Jews were counted in the city in 1663. The Great Turkish War brought destruction on the community, and only a century later did it return to its pre-war size. The censuses conducted by the Ottoman authorities did not produce accurate figures for the Jewish population, because some of Belgrade's Jews avoided being counted in order to escape the burden of taxation, while others were foreign subjects who were not required to register. A census taken in 1856 counted 284 Jewish families comprising 1,506 people, a figure that excluded foreign subjects; about 1,300 of them belonged to the Sephardi congregation and about 200 to the Ashkenazi one. In 1890, 2,599 Jews were counted in Belgrade, and in 1895 the community numbered 3,097 people, 61 per cent of all the Jews of Serbia. The rate of natural increase stood at slightly over 2 per cent a year.

At the beginning of the 20th century the Jews of Belgrade numbered 3,270 people, and after the First World War and the founding of the Kingdom of Serbs, Croats and Slovenes the community grew rapidly. In 1931 it numbered close to 8,000 people, and on the outbreak of the Second World War about 12,000. More than 90 per cent of Belgrade's Jews were killed in the Holocaust in Yugoslavia, and in 1945 the community numbered 1,423 people. After the establishment of Israel and the granting of the "repatriation" authorisation by the Yugoslav authorities, many of Belgrade's Jews emigrated there, and by 1961 the community numbered 490. (Note: This figure refers to those who declared themselves Jewish in the census.) As Belgrade became a metropolis and the nerve centre of Yugoslavia, Jews from other communities migrated to it, and in the early 1970s the community numbered 1,600 people. The centralised communist regime in Yugoslavia, although more tolerant than its counterparts in the Eastern Bloc, did not look favourably on religious and national markers; at the same time the community became secular and intermarriage within it increased. Through the late 20th and early 21st centuries the number of Jewish residents declined, and the number who declared themselves Jewish in censuses declined further still. In the census of 2011, 295 residents of Belgrade declared themselves Jews.

Estimates of the number of Jews in Belgrade vary, as the available sources draw variously on census returns, on the records of the Jewish community, and on the number of members paying community dues, some of whom are probably not Jewish. In 2016 the Jewish population of Serbia was estimated at between 1,400 and 2,800, about 60 per cent of whom lived in Belgrade, including Zemun. Serbian censuses do not require a person to declare their religion or ethnic origin, and some members of the community choose not to declare that they are Jewish. After the restitution law was passed in 2017 the number of people paying dues to the community rose considerably, reaching 2,000 by 2022, although some of those who joined are not Jewish and did so for financial reasons connected to the restitution of property.

Recorded Jewish population of Belgrade
Year	Population	Notes
1663	800	
1700s (early)	250	
1856	1,506	Excludes foreign subjects
1890	2,599	
1895	3,097	61% of all Serbian Jews
1921	4,844	
1931	7,906	
1941	10,388–11,870	Estimates differ
1945	1,423	
1961	490	Self-declared
2011	295	Self-declared

== Economy ==
=== The Ottoman period ===
In the early years of Ottoman rule the members of the community are described as merchants, some of whom owned or leased real property. Jewish trade was generally conducted alongside Ottoman trade and included journeys to commercial fairs in neighbouring cities. Rabbinic responsa record commercial disputes brought before rabbis for adjudication where the parties were Jews, while Ottoman documents record suits brought by Jewish merchants against Muslim merchants in the sharia court, from which it emerges that members of the community enjoyed the right to bring cases before that court. After the conquest of Buda by Suleiman the Magnificent in 1541 the trade routes of the empire expanded, and members of the community traded with Venice, Ragusa, Florence, Sofia and Buda. There is extensive documentation of this commercial network, including reciprocal ties with Jewish communities throughout the Balkans; part of it concerns the murder or natural death of merchants of the community in the course of trading journeys, recorded in connection with the release of their widows. In January 1565 Suleiman personally ordered an investigation into the murder of six Jews, emissaries of Doña Gracia Mendes Nasi, who had come to Belgrade to attend to her affairs and were killed by robbers while sailing from Belgrade to Vidin.

The Ottoman authorities encouraged trade in Belgrade, and the rate of taxation imposed on the community was lower than in Salonica or Constantinople. Most members of the community were literate and multilingual, and they were absorbed into the Ottoman administrative apparatus as interpreters or served as interpreters for foreign consuls.

Two kinds of tax were imposed on the community in the early period of Ottoman rule. The first was a uniform poll tax, the jizya, levied on the members of all the congregations; the second was a community tax collected progressively by the rabbis of the community, the burden of which was determined by the income of the head of the household rather than by the number of persons in it. A further tax known as rav akçesi was later imposed, under which the community paid for the right to maintain a rabbi. In times of war additional taxes were levied, such as a "clothing tax" that obliged the community to finance the production of uniforms for the Ottoman garrison in the city, and a tax on the ritual slaughter of meat known as the gabela was introduced later still. Members of the community also paid internal progressive community taxes to finance the leadership of the community, its institutions and its various officeholders. Collection was carried out through the iltizam system, the farming of the right to collect taxes in a given area; the holder of the right was a senior official of the Ottoman administration, and on several occasions during the period of Ottoman rule Jews of the Belgrade community are documented as tax farmers. The tax burden was also imposed on Jewish merchants from outside the Belgrade community who came to the city on business and stayed there for more than a year. The taxation of non-residents provoked a serious controversy and appears many times in the responsa. Rabbi Moses Amarillo issued a ruling denying the community's right to collect tax from foreign merchants, on the grounds that it contradicted the principle of dina d'malkhuta dina, since the Ottoman government wished for freedom of trade within its realm; later, Rabbi Haim Nissim Raphael Mucciri, chief rabbi of Serres, took the opposite view and upheld the imposition of taxes on foreign merchants.

The merchants of the community maintained frequent trading relations with the communities of Vienna, Buda, Salonica, Constantinople, Skopje, Monastir, Kastoria, Vidin and Sofia, and delegations of merchants from the community are recorded at trade fairs in Leipzig, Struga, Ragusa and Venice. After the Habsburg conquest of Belgrade in 1717, several Jewish families are documented as engaging in small-scale industry, operating breweries and producing arak in return for a percentage of the profits paid to the Austrian authorities. When the Ottomans returned to Belgrade in 1739, members of the community who served under foreign diplomatic representatives enjoyed substantial relief from taxation under the capitulation agreements.

=== The Serbian and Yugoslav period ===
The Serbian Revolution caused enormous damage to property and heavy casualties among the Jews of Belgrade, and rehabilitation of the community began only after the establishment of the Principality of Serbia under Miloš Obrenović. When the royal printing house was founded in 1837, Hebrew type was ordered for it as well, and texts were printed there in Hebrew and Ladino. Jewish merchants were granted equal rights and an extensive trade with the cities of the Balkans developed. In 1839, after Obrenović was compelled to give up power, the position of Belgrade's Jews began to be constrained. The nationalist Defenders of the Constitution set out among other things to restrict the economic activity of Serbia's Jews substantially. In the first stage the opening of their businesses on Sundays was prohibited, so that Jewish businesses were closed on both Saturday and Sunday, a measure that considerably worsened the economic position of Jewish merchants. Their situation deteriorated further after Alexander Karađorđević came to power: his government forbade Jews to trade outside the Jalija quarter, and property was confiscated on various pretexts.

After the return of the House of Obrenović to power a gradual change in the economic standing of Belgrade's Jews began, and met fierce resistance from the Serbian economic elite. One of the episodes that hastened the process of emancipation concerned Israel ben Jacob Stern, known among the Jews of Belgrade as "Kochav Tov", a prosperous merchant and British subject whose business activity in and around Belgrade was restricted by the Serbian authorities on account of his Jewish origin. Stern, who was entitled to freedom of trade under the capitulation agreements, appealed to the British consul, who lodged a sharp protest with the Serbian authorities. The Serbs continued to obstruct him, and the affair caused a diplomatic incident between Britain and Serbia and drew in further foreign consuls as well as the French government, through Adolphe Crémieux. A census taken in Belgrade in 1856 counted 284 Jewish families, of which 30, or 10.56 per cent, were classed as prosperous and the remainder as dependent on support. Thirty per cent of the heads of households were engaged in commerce, 14 per cent were wage earners, 5 per cent worked in tanning, 5 per cent were servants and 4 per cent were retailers; in 9 per cent of families there was no principal breadwinner at all, for various reasons.

In the last years of the 19th century the economic position of Belgrade's Jews improved somewhat, chiefly because of the equality of rights they had been granted, which extended to the economic sphere. Members of the community traded in clothing, silk and linen and in fruit and vegetables, and for the first time the community included members of the liberal professions, such as physicians, as well as tailors and cobblers. In 1893 the authorities forbade the Jews of Belgrade to sell tobacco and spirits, a measure that obliged Rabbi Simon Bernfeld to appeal to King Alexander I of Serbia to have the decree rescinded. At the same time the community's merchants were required to close their businesses on Sundays and on Christian holidays, even though Serbian merchants were permitted to open on Christian Orthodox holidays; since members of the community also closed their businesses on the Sabbath, they were left with only 140 trading days in the year.

The Great Depression of 1929 did not pass over the Jews of Belgrade. Jewish-owned banks went bankrupt when substantial debts owed to them went unpaid because their clients had become insolvent, and bankruptcies were recorded in industry, commerce and insurance as well. The position of wage earners in the community also deteriorated sharply as a result of mass dismissals. Towards the middle of the 1930s an economic recovery set in within the community.

In the early 1940s, as contacts between the Yugoslav government and Nazi Germany matured, anti-Jewish legislation including economic restrictions was introduced in the kingdom, and after the invasion of Yugoslavia the Nazis and their helpers began the organised plunder of Jewish property in Belgrade under the direction of Franz Neuhausen. After the war and the renewal of the community, its members were absorbed into the Yugoslav economic system. Because most of the community had been murdered, a great deal of property was left without heirs and was nationalised. Under the agreements that concluded the Second World War, countries such as Hungary and Romania were required to transfer heirless property that had been in Jewish ownership to Jewish organisations, but this provision was not applied in Yugoslavia, and the establishment of a communist regime and a planned economy ruled out any restitution of private property. In 2017, 25 years after the break-up of Yugoslavia, the Serbian parliament passed legislation for the restitution of Jewish property seized during the Holocaust, under which the Jewish community is entitled to recover heirless property.

== Education ==
=== The Ottoman period ===
The elementary education of the prosperous members of the community took place in the meldar, the Talmud Torah of the Balkan communities. Only boys studied there, learning prayers and the Hebrew Bible. Some of the meldars were privately owned by rabbis and cantors and depended on donations and on payments by parents, so that only prosperous families could send their sons to study. Children between the ages of four and twelve sat on mats in a crowded classroom; instruction was conducted in Ladino and rested on rote learning, and the meldars lacked both basic sanitary conditions and teaching equipment. After half a day of study the pupils were employed as apprentices to craftsmen of the community. The level of education among the community's children was low by comparison with the communities of western Europe, and scarcely allowed those who studied to go on to higher education. In the early 17th century Rabbi Judah Lerma founded a yeshiva in Belgrade, and until the Austrian conquest of 1688 the city was a centre of Jewish law and of rabbinic training; among those trained there were Simcha Cohen Freudmann and Joseph Almosnino.

In the closing period of Ottoman rule the curriculum was altered and history, geography and Jewish studies were taught as well. The teachers' salaries were paid by the community, and pupils in need received food and study materials from it. The rate of literacy among the pupils was very high, though only in Hebrew and Ladino.

=== The Serbian and Yugoslav period ===
In 1842 a beth midrash was established in Belgrade, financed by an increase in the gabela tax. By 1861 the Sephardi community was running a meldar for boys with seven classes, in which Hebrew was taught along with lessons in the Bible, and in the seventh class Serbian and German as well. Boys were admitted from the age of four. The teachers were appointed by the community, and the teaching staff was generally made up of merchants who had gone bankrupt. In the early 20th century Shabtai Djaen taught Hebrew at the school. An elementary school for girls opened in 1864.

Towards the end of the 19th century the process of secularisation accelerated, alongside a slow and gradual movement out of the Jewish quarter and into general society and the general education system. Part of this process was compelled and directed by the Serbian government. One of its most striking features was a rise in the proportion of Jews declaring Serbian as their mother tongue and a rise in the rate of literacy. In 1885 the Serbian minister of education directed that religious instruction be limited to two hours a week and made the study of Serbian compulsory in Jewish schools, in order to hasten the integration of the community into the state. In 1895, 3 per cent of Belgrade's Jews declared Serbian as their mother tongue, and by 1900 the proportion had risen to 46 per cent; over the same period the proportion declaring Ladino as their mother tongue fell from 80 per cent to 27 per cent, and the proportion declaring German fell from 12.5 per cent to 8 per cent. In 1900 the rate of literacy among the Jewish population stood at 57 per cent, higher than that of the general population.

After the First World War a Jewish kindergarten was established in Belgrade, staffed by kindergarten teachers brought from Palestine. In 1918, 700 Jewish pupils were counted in the elementary and secondary schools of Belgrade. A teachers' seminary run by the community operated in the city and trained teachers of Hebrew; it closed in the early 1920s, after which the Jewish education system relied on teachers brought from Palestine. By the late 1920s most members of the community were educated in the general school system, within which several hours a week were set aside for religious and Hebrew studies for Jewish pupils. In 1932 the David Alkalai Kindergarten was opened, where Hebrew was taught and whose staff were brought from Palestine; 200 children attended it between 1932 and 1941. In the early 1940s, as contacts between the Yugoslav government and Nazi Germany matured, anti-Jewish legislation was introduced in the kingdom that included a numerus clausus in educational institutions at every level. The restrictions obliged the community to open a private school, financed jointly by the Sephardi and Ashkenazi communities. With the outbreak of the military coup that deposed Prince Paul, teaching ceased. After the German occupation pupils were registered for the 1941–42 school year, but the year never began.

After the Second World War the surviving community was largely absorbed into the general Yugoslav education system. In 1964 a general elementary school named after the Baruh Brothers was established. After the break-up of Yugoslavia and the establishment of Serbia, a Jewish kindergarten and a Jewish elementary school were founded in Belgrade, the latter attended by non-Jewish pupils as well.

== Religious and communal life ==
=== Communal organisation ===
Among the families documented in Belgrade during the 16th century were Bar-Nahman, Bar-David, Bar-Yitzhak, Bechar, Varon, Sakamish, Meshulam, Chaldeti, Halfi, Hakim and Adaniya. After the founding of the Principality of Serbia, the small Ashkenazi congregation relied on the religious and communal services of the Sephardi congregation and paid community taxes accordingly. Towards the middle of the 19th century, after the establishment of the beth midrash in the city, the gabela tax was raised in order to finance it, which led to a conflict between the Ashkenazi and Sephardi congregations, the Ashkenazim refusing to fund the institution. In 1860 Lazar Levinson, the head of the Ashkenazi congregation, announced its separation from the Sephardi congregation and the establishment of a distinct community. The Serbian authorities attempted to mediate between the two, their representatives finding it difficult to grasp the differences between the congregations. The attempts at mediation failed and the two communities operated separately thereafter. The Sephardi community was run by an elected committee of sixteen members, chosen every two years by those members of the community who paid its taxes. Various community taxes were collected, among them one per cent of every dowry. The committee appointed wardens and administrators for the community's institutions, and was responsible for appointing the community's rabbi. After the destruction of the community in the Holocaust the two communities merged into one, and the Ashkenazi synagogue remained the only one in operation in the city.

== Culture and the arts ==
With the founding of the Principality of Serbia under Miloš Obrenović, the musician Josif Šlezinger was appointed artistic director and conductor of the Serbian princely orchestra. In 1879 a choral society was founded under the name of the Serbian–Jewish Choral Society, which continued its activity after the Second World War as the Braća Baruh Choir, named after the partisan siblings Isidor Baruh, the painter Bora Baruh, Josif, Berta and Rahela Baruh, who fell in the ranks of the Yugoslav Partisans. The choir performed outside Yugoslavia and appeared in Israel in 1952 and 1958 as part of the Zimriya festival. In 1889 the musical society David was founded, which maintained a wind orchestra and was intended to introduce the Jews of Belgrade to European culture; it was active until the end of the 19th century. In 1910 the ensemble La Lira was founded, which recorded and performed Jewish music.

The painter Leon Koen was the first Jewish artist of note in Serbia. Most of his works were lost during the Holocaust; twelve of his paintings are held by the National Museum of Serbia in Belgrade and three by the Jewish Historical Museum in the city. Moša Pijade was also a painter, and his works are exhibited at the National Museum in Belgrade and at the National Museum in Skopje. The graphic artist David "Dido" Demajo (1906–1964) was likewise prominent. In sculpture, the sculptor Nandor Glid, who studied and worked in Belgrade, was the outstanding figure. Another well-known member of the community was the composer Oskar Danon, who served as director of the Belgrade opera. In the closing decades of the 20th century Eugen Verber, Predrag Ejdus and Rahela Ferrari were prominent as actors, and in literature the novelist Gordana Kuić, author of the best-selling The Scent of Rain in the Balkans, stood out.

In 1837 a Hebrew section was set up at the printing house of the Principality of Serbia, in which the writings of Judah Alkalai, Eliezer Papo and later Simon Bernfeld were printed among others. The Hebrew section operated until 1880, when it closed, and printing was thereafter carried out by private presses belonging to members of the community. Some 50 books were printed in Hebrew up to the coup of 1903. After Peter I of Serbia came to power a rapid process of assimilation set in among the Jews of Belgrade, and as part of it books were printed in Serbian. In 1888 the first community newspaper in Ladino appeared, El Amigo del Pueblo, which was distributed for four years; it was followed by the periodicals Pasatiempo and Hashalom, which appeared until 1906. In this period the use of Ladino as a principal spoken language declined markedly in favour of Serbian. At the beginning of the 20th century the weekly Beogradski Jevrejski Glasnik appeared, edited by Moric Herzl and containing sections in Ladino as well; it was published until 1924. A Jewish press agency founded in Belgrade distributed news concerning the life of the Jewish communities of the Kingdom of Yugoslavia and operated until 1940.

=== Rabbis and religious life ===
==== The Ottoman period ====
From the middle of the 16th century a rabbinical court of ten judges was active in Belgrade. In the early 17th century Israel Aba served as chief rabbi of the Jews of Belgrade, and after him Rabbi Meir ben Abraham Angel, a native of Sofia who had held rabbinical office in Sofia and Constantinople and was the author of Keshet Nehusha and Masoret ha-Brit. Angel served until 1617, when he emigrated to Safed, where he died. Rabbi Judah Lerma held office between 1617 and 1642; he founded a yeshiva in Belgrade and published works of Jewish law, most of which were apparently lost in a fire in the city. From 1642 until 1668 Lerma's pupil Rabbi Simcha ben Gershon HaKohen served in Belgrade, and in 1647 published his teacher's volume of responsa, Pleitat Beit Yehuda, in Venice. In 1668 HaKohen left for Buda to take up the rabbinate there and was succeeded by his son-in-law Joseph Almosnino, who had been a leading pupil of Jacob Hagiz at his yeshiva in Jerusalem and a study partner of Nathan of Gaza. Almosnino's tenure was among the most turbulent in the history of Belgrade Jewry, which then numbered 800 people. He was more than once accused of Sabbateanism, a matter that caused an uproar in the community: it emerged that during his tenure the Belgrade community sent two emissaries to Sabbatai Zevi, and that Almosnino copied and circulated the writings of Nathan of Gaza. It also emerges that after Sabbatai Zevi's death Almosnino permitted his widow Jochebed to remarry, having taken testimony as to his death. Members of the Dönmeh sect subsequently arrived in Belgrade from Salonica, and although they were placed under a ban they maintained contact with members of the community. In 1688 Belgrade was captured by the Habsburg army, and Almosnino, together with 45 of the community's notables and wealthiest members, was taken to detention at Nikolsburg in the expectation of high ransom payments. He died in captivity in 1689. His writings were plundered by Habsburg soldiers, sold to the Ottomans and brought to Constantinople, where they were bought by his family and published in two volumes under the title Edut bi-Yehosef, the first in 1711 and the second in 1733.

In 1692 Rabbi Samuel Pinto of Salonica was appointed chief rabbi and devoted himself chiefly to rebuilding the community. At the beginning of the 18th century Yissachar Bechar Moshe was appointed, and visits by emissaries from Jerusalem to Belgrade are recorded. In 1717 the city was again taken by the Austrians, and it is from this period that a separate Ashkenazi community is documented. In 1720 Rabbi Benjamin Zeev Yaffe Margaliot Schlesinger (1657, Klosterneuburg – 17 June 1727, Vienna) was appointed chief Ashkenazi rabbi, but left after a short time for reasons that are not known, apparently on account of his age and health; he moved to Vienna, where he died. In 1724 three congregations are documented in Belgrade, two Sephardi and one Ashkenazi, the Sephardim having apparently split in two following a dispute. Rabbi Levi ben Isaac Yerushalmi served as rabbi of the Ashkenazi community, and since he was acceptable to the Sephardim as well and spoke Ladino in addition to Yiddish, he was also appointed acting chief Sephardi rabbi of both Sephardi congregations. It is recorded that when giving rulings in the Sephardi congregations he followed the rulings of Maimonides, and when ruling in the Ashkenazi congregation those of Moses Isserles. In 1739, after the return of the Ottomans to Belgrade, Yerushalmi left the city and moved to Timișoara.

After Yerushalmi's departure Rabbi Nathan Ginzburg was appointed rabbi of both communities and held the post until 1752, when he left to serve in the rabbinate in Buda. He was succeeded by Rabbi Solomon Shalem, who in practice was scarcely present in Belgrade. In 1761 Shalem moved to Amsterdam and was appointed rabbi of the Portuguese community there, but refused to relinquish his title as chief rabbi of Belgrade; the community continued to pay his salary although he was not in the city and there was no one to answer questions of Jewish law. For a time Rabbi David Pardo served as acting chief rabbi, but he left for Sarajevo because he could not be given a permanent appointment while Shalem was alive. In 1772 Rabbi Yissachar ben Haim Abulafia, born in Tiberias and formerly of the Sofia rabbinate, was appointed acting rabbi, returning to Sofia in 1774. In 1781, after Shalem's death, Rabbi Azriel ben Yehiel Migriso was appointed chief rabbi of Belgrade, with his son Joshua Raphael Migriso sitting on the rabbinical court. When the Habsburg army took Belgrade in 1789 the Austrians left the institution of the rabbinate in place and permitted the rabbinical court to continue its work. On the Ottoman return the local vali, Osman Topal Pasha, ordered the imprisonment of Migriso and the members of the court. The Jews of Belgrade raised a large sum towards their ransom, but Azriel Migriso died in prison before the collection was complete, and his son Joshua Raphael was appointed in his place. In 1794 an outbreak of plague in Belgrade took many lives, among them that of Joshua Raphael Migriso, and David Haim ben Abraham Pinto, a grandson of David Pardo, was appointed chief rabbi; he left Belgrade on the outbreak of the Serbian Revolution.

==== The Serbian and Yugoslav period ====
After the founding of the Principality of Serbia, Rabbi Abraham ben Isaac Pardo was appointed rabbi of Belgrade. Pardo left the city during the Serbian Revolution and moved to Zemun, where he wrote four volumes of homiletics: Hibat Avraham, Tzitzim u-Frahim, Otzar Tachshitei Kallah and Amtahat ha-Katan, published by his son in 1862. In 1831 he wrote to Prince Miloš Obrenović asking him to ease the economic decrees imposed on the Jews of Belgrade. Pardo died in 1835 and was succeeded by Rabbi Reuven Baruch, who came into conflict with the community's notables, who demanded his removal; on 21 June 1837, 28 families lodged a complaint against him with Prince Obrenović, and the prince ordered him to leave the city. Baruch went to Vienna, where he was appointed chief Sephardi rabbi. He was succeeded by Joseph Finzi ben Isaac of Sarajevo, author of va-Yelaket Yosef, who served until his death in 1850. Rabbi Joseph Raphael ben Meir Sasson (1810, Edirne – 1862, Belgrade), author of Darkei ha-Adam and Musar Haskel (Salonica, 1843), is subsequently documented as chief Sephardi rabbi of Belgrade. Sasson arrived in the city in 1851 and lived with his family in the community house; a strict figure, he came into conflict with both the Sephardi and the Ashkenazi congregations, and died in Belgrade in 1862.

In the middle of the 19th century Rabbi Judah Zeev Weinberger served as chief Ashkenazi rabbi. He is documented in 1862 in Zemun, to which he fled after the shelling of Belgrade from the Belgrade Fortress by Ottoman forces, and wrote in the Hebrew newspaper HaMagid about the plight of the Jews of Belgrade who had fled there. He was followed by Rabbi J. Tauber, a native of Zemun, as rabbi of the Ashkenazi community; Tauber came to Belgrade on Sabbaths, festivals and special occasions at the community's invitation. After the death of Joseph Raphael Sasson no permanent rabbi was appointed for the Sephardi community, which was run by a group of judges. In 1884 Rabbi Benjamin Hamaoui arrived in Belgrade as an emissary and agreed to take up the rabbinate there, but within a few months came into conflict with the community's leaders and was obliged to give up the post. The leaders of the Sephardi congregation placed advertisements in the Hebrew press in Europe and in Palestine seeking a rabbi, Ashkenazi or Sephardi, willing to serve in their community. Negotiations were conducted for a time with Solomon Mandelkern, who came to Belgrade to be considered, but the community could not meet the salary he asked. Finally, in 1886, Rabbi Simon Bernfeld was appointed chief rabbi, head of the rabbinical court and supervisor of the beth midrash. Bernfeld learned Ladino and preached in it, but was regarded as too liberal by the Sephardi congregation; he suffered from severe rheumatism and in 1893 left his post and moved to Berlin. After his departure the judge Abraham ben Israel Bejarano, a native of Stara Zagora, was appointed rabbi of the Sephardi community and served until his death in 1905; his son Raphael Bejarano was killed in the First World War.

Isaac Cohen Schlang arrived in Belgrade in 1902 and was later appointed chief Ashkenazi rabbi. In 1908 Rabbi Isaac Alcalay was appointed chief rabbi of the Jews of Belgrade, in 1911 chief rabbi of the Kingdom of Serbia, and subsequently chief rabbi of the Kingdom of Yugoslavia. In 1935 Rabbi Zvi Henrik Kaufman, a graduate of the Vienna Rabbinical Seminary, was appointed acting chief Ashkenazi rabbi on account of Schlang's health. From the late 1930s cases of conversion to Christianity occurred among the Jews of Belgrade. During the Second World War Alcalay succeeded in escaping to the United States; Isaac Cohen Schlang was killed at the Banjica concentration camp and Zvi Henrik Kaufman at Topovske Šupe.

After the war and the establishment of the Socialist Federal Republic of Yugoslavia, and with the subsequent emigration to Israel, the community became secular in character and the trend towards assimilation grew stronger. For a period Rabbi Menachem Romano served as chief rabbi of the Jews of Yugoslavia and of Belgrade. After the break-up of Yugoslavia and the establishment of Serbia, communal activity was gradually renewed; as of 2018 Isak Asiel served as chief rabbi of the Jews of Serbia and of Belgrade.

=== Communal institutions, organisations and societies ===
A Bikur Holim society is documented in Belgrade from the end of the 16th century, supported by donations from the community's notables; the wills of leading members show that they bequeathed considerable sums to it. In the early 17th century money was sent from the Belgrade society to "the poor of the Land of Israel", in Ottoman currency such as the akçe or in Habsburg currency such as the Reichsthaler, according to the ruling power of the day. In 1886 the society had 280 members and was headed by Jacob de Medina. It employed a full-time physician who visited the sick in the Jewish quarter, and maintained a pharmacy that distributed medicines free of charge to those in need on the physician's prescription. The society suspended its activity during the First World War and resumed it in 1927.

Several institutions operated within the community with budgets and management of their own, under the supervision of the community committee. Talmud Torah assisted in buying books and equipment for the studies of children from poor families; Aniyei ha-Ir distributed charity to the poor; Mukei ha-Milhama assisted families of all religions whose economic position had been damaged by the wars; and Tzitzit provided material assistance towards religious obligations such as a bar mitzvah or the marriage of a poor bride. Six charitable funds also operated for institutions in the Land of Israel. In 1864 a branch of the Alliance Israélite Universelle opened in Belgrade, and by the end of the 19th century it had 90 members. The Tikkun Hatzot society built a heated hall for assembly and prayer in the courtyard of the synagogue, where light refreshments and hot drinks were given to worshippers who came for the midnight vigil. In 1874 a group of women of the Sephardi community founded the Jewish Women's Society, the first women's society in Serbia, which assisted female pupils, brides and new mothers of limited means; some sources refer to it as the Nashim Tzidkaniyot society.

In 1886 the Korei Michtavei ha-Itim society was founded, which acquired a reading and lecture hall and subscribed to periodicals from around the world, working to raise the level of literacy and education among members of the community. A chevra kadisha and a society known as Hevrat ha-Rehitza handled funeral and burial arrangements for the community's dead. The burial customs of the Sephardi and Ashkenazi congregations differed: the Sephardim buried their dead no later than six hours after death, the Ashkenazim only after twenty-four. After the granting of equal rights, young members of the community began to enter higher education, and in 1897 the Mishan society (Serbo-Croatian: Potpora) was founded to award study grants to them; many of its recipients later became prominent public figures, among them David Albala, Žak Konfino and Isaac Alcalay. In the 1920s grants were awarded totalling about one million Yugoslav dinars. A lodge of B'nai B'rith was established in the city in 1911; it ceased activity on the outbreak of the First World War and resumed in 1923.

After the First World War and the founding of the Kingdom of Serbs, Croats and Slovenes, a contest developed within the Jewish community between supporters of Zionism, advocates of Sephardi separatism, and those who favoured integration into Serbian society and called themselves "Serbs of the Mosaic faith". In the early 1920s the Organisation of Sephardi Jews of Belgrade was founded, which pursued a separatist line emphasising the Sephardi character of its members and opposed the Zionist idea. Its representatives took part in the conferences of the World Sephardi Federation, and in 1930 organised the Balkan Conference of Sephardi Jews in Belgrade, at which representatives of Bulgarian Jewry succeeded in mediating between the Sephardi organisation and the leaders of the Zionist movement in the city. Supporters of integration sent their children to the Serbian scout movement. The Zionist movement, for its part, founded the HaMevaser society in 1925, which organised tours of the Land of Israel, and in the same year a branch of WIZO was founded in the city by Celina Sokolow, daughter of Nahum Sokolow. A local Zionist organisation was later established that brought together all Zionist activity in the city, headed by community notables including Friedrich Pops. In 1929 a new Jewish elementary school building was erected, and beside it the community's Beit ha-Am and an old people's home named the Home for the Elderly of the Mosaic Faith.

In the early 1930s the Zionist movement attained a dominant position in Jewish communal life. Young members of the scout troop left it and founded a branch of Hashomer Hatzair in Belgrade, which by 1938 had 1,374 members. In 1935 a cell of the Blau-Weiss youth movement was founded, and later a cell of the Akiva youth movement of the General Zionists. In this period the community ran the Mensa, a kosher restaurant for Jewish students who came to study at the University of Belgrade. A cell of Betar also operated in the city, with few members. In 1936 David Albala founded the intellectual circle Ahva, which brought together educated members of Belgrade Jewry and served as an ideological forum for the community; his deputy was Albert Vajs.

After the Second World War and the establishment of Yugoslavia under communist rule, the community operated within the framework of the Federation of Jewish Communities of Yugoslavia. On the initiative of Albert Vajs the Jewish Historical Museum was founded, one of its principal aims being the commemoration of the Jewish community of Belgrade. The community's leaders were active over the years in the World Jewish Congress and took part from time to time in Zionist Congresses. In 2019 the Jewish Digital Library was established, with the aim of collecting, preserving, digitising and presenting online material relating to Serbian Jewry in general and to the Jews of Belgrade in particular.

=== Synagogues ===
==== The Sephardi Old Synagogue ====
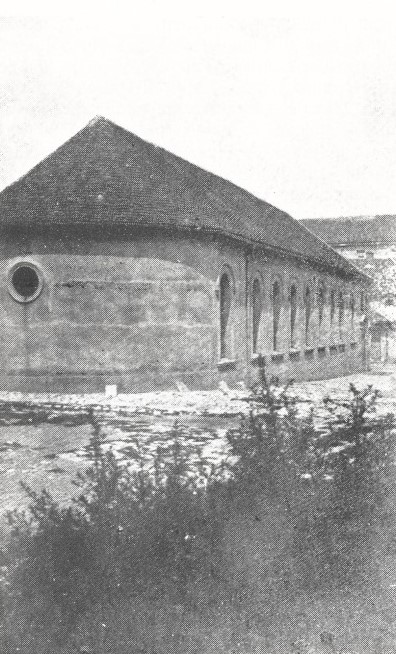
The Old Synagogue in Belgrade, El Kal, which stood from 1690 until 1952

In the early Ottoman period at least one central Sephardi synagogue is known to have stood in Belgrade, described as built of wood and stone. During the Austrian siege of 1688 and the looting that followed the conquest it was set on fire and destroyed. In 1690, with the restoration of Ottoman rule, the synagogue was rebuilt, and it later became known as the Old Synagogue. During the wars between the Ottomans and the Habsburg monarchy the building was damaged by shelling, in 1717 and again in 1739, and in 1752, 1790 and 1795 it was severely damaged by fires. It was restored and returned to use thanks to donations sent by the Jews of Mantua. In 1861 three Sephardi synagogues were recorded in Belgrade, known in the language of the community as havra, from the Turkish for synagogue. The building was damaged again in 1862 when the Ottomans shelled the city from the Belgrade Fortress. At the end of the 19th century, when the Jews of Belgrade were permitted to settle in all parts of the city, many left the Jalija quarter and the congregation dwindled. The building survived the Second World War, but in 1952 it was demolished by the Yugoslav authorities to make way for a new town plan.

==== The Sephardi Bet Israel Synagogue ====
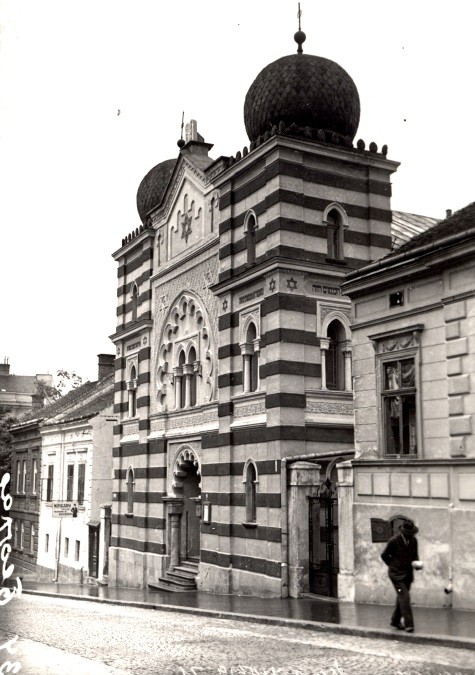
The Bet Israel Synagogue in Belgrade, which stood from 1908 until 1944

As the Jews of Belgrade dispersed through the city at the end of the 19th century, many moved to Upper Dorćol, known in Serbian as Zerek. The community grew rapidly and approached 4,000 members. In the early 20th century the committee of the Sephardi congregation, headed by David Alkalai, decided to build a new central synagogue for the congregation in Upper Dorćol and to finance the project by a subscription among the members of the community. The foundation stone was laid in 1907 by Peter I of Serbia, and the building was inaugurated in 1908. On 6 April 1941, when Nazi Germany invaded Yugoslavia, Belgrade was heavily bombed and the synagogue was damaged; in 1944 the building was blown up by retreating German soldiers. After the war it was restored and converted into an art gallery, which is also used for concerts.

==== The Ashkenazi Sukkat Shalom Synagogue ====
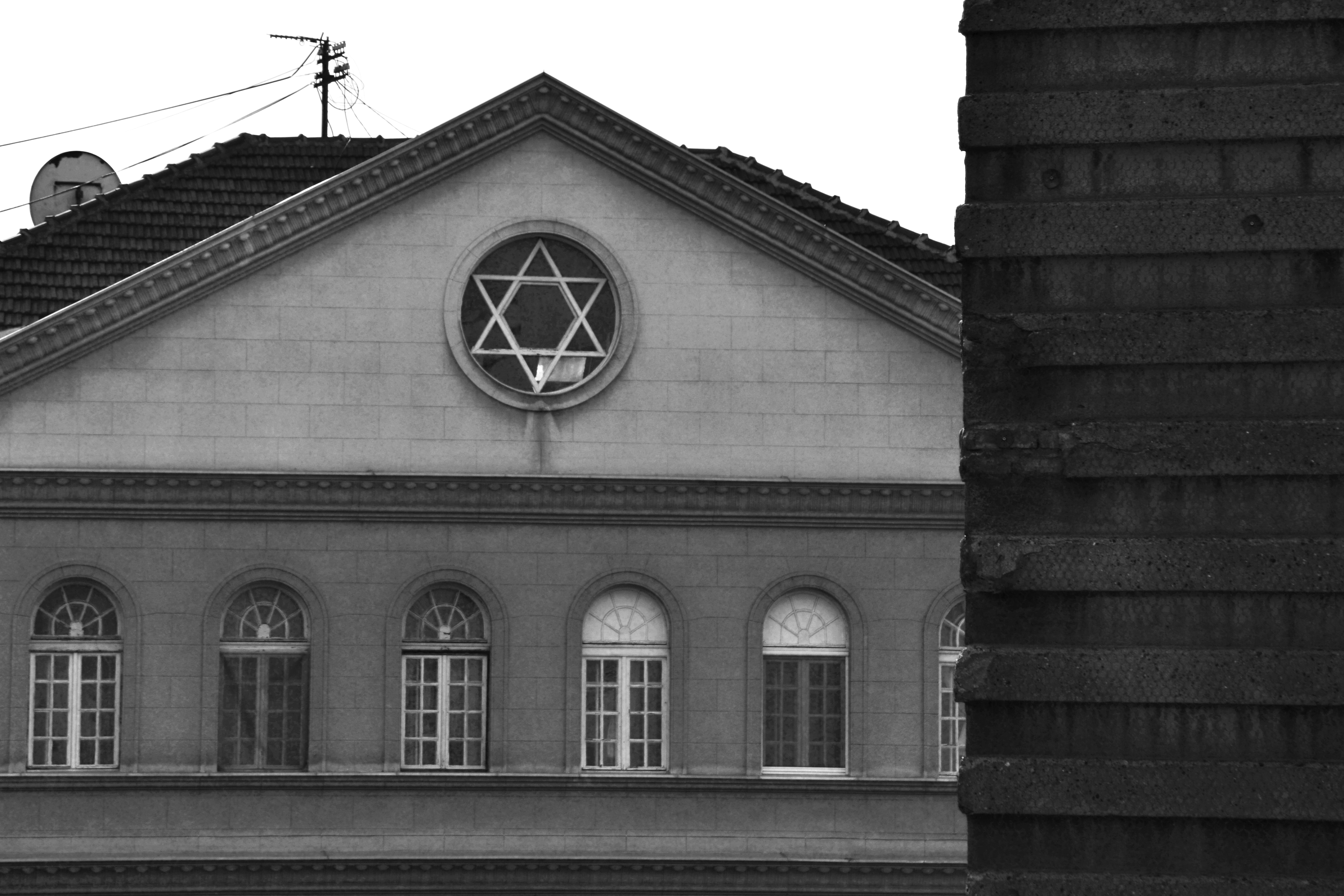
The Ashkenazi Sukkat Shalom Synagogue, the only one to remain in use in Belgrade after the Second World War

A small organised Ashkenazi community was founded after the Austrians took Belgrade in 1717. At the end of the 18th century or the beginning of the 19th a building was rented in the Jalija quarter, close to the Sephardi Old Synagogue, in which the Ashkenazi congregation prayed. It was known as "the New" synagogue and its services were conducted in German. On 1 October 1869 the authorities gave official recognition to the Ashkenazi community. According to a description from 1886, the "New" synagogue opened only on Sabbaths and festivals, and even then a quorum was assembled with difficulty. Its worshippers belonged to the Neolog stream and formed a minority within a congregation that tended towards assimilation. At the end of the 19th century the migration of Ashkenazi merchants and officials to Belgrade increased; these were generally prosperous families, who settled in Upper Dorćol rather than in Jalija. In the early 20th century a building in Upper Dorćol was rented, renovated and converted into a synagogue known as "the Temple", which also housed the rabbi's residence and those of other communal officeholders, together with a classroom for boys and one for girls. It remained in use until 1926.

After the First World War internal migration within the Kingdom of Yugoslavia brought many Ashkenazi Jews to Belgrade, chiefly from Vojvodina. The proportion of regular worshippers among the migrants from Vojvodina was relatively high, and "the Temple" became too small to hold them. Friedrich Pops, president of the Ashkenazi community, initiated the building of a new synagogue, and after negotiations with the municipality of Belgrade a plot of land was allocated free of charge. The Sukkat Shalom Synagogue, with 300 seats, was inaugurated in 1926; its services followed the Neolog rite and were accompanied by an organ. During the Second World War the Nazis turned the building into a brothel. It survived the war, was restored afterwards, and remained the only synagogue in use in Belgrade.

=== Cemeteries ===
In 1521 the Ottomans allotted the community a plot of land beside the city walls, close to the lower course of the Sava, for a Jewish cemetery. The Jewish cemetery is marked on several maps from 1688, before the Austrian conquest. During the fighting against the Austrians, gravestones were apparently taken for reuse in fortifying the citadel. A map from 1735 shows a Jewish cemetery at the edge of the Jalija quarter, and some of the graves and gravestones were moved there from the first cemetery. It is recorded that during excavations for the foundations of new buildings in the area of the first cemetery, fragments of gravestones and human bones were uncovered. In 1759 residents of Turkish origin took gravestones from the cemetery to develop the surroundings of the Yahya Pasha mosque; the leaders of the community appealed to the sharia court, which ordered the removal of the gravestones to cease at once. The stones that had been taken were returned to the community, and since they had been dressed and their inscriptions effaced, the chief rabbi Solomon ben Yehiel Shalem permitted their sale and the transfer of the proceeds to the chevra kadisha. As the city and the Jewish quarter expanded, the location of the cemeteries changed accordingly.

In 1876 work began on a new building in the market district of Belgrade, and during the excavations a section of a Jewish cemetery was uncovered, with gravestones on some of which the Hebrew inscription could still be read. One of them was that of "the eminent sage Aharon Yitzhak Abravanel", though the date of death could not be recovered. Some scholars attributed the stone to Isaac, the son of Judah Abravanel, and concluded on that basis that Jewish settlement in Belgrade predated the expulsion from Spain; this view is rejected by modern scholarship. During the 19th century the cemetery lay in the Palilula district, in the area of Dalmatinska Street.

In 1887 the local administration ordered the community to close the old cemetery in order to implement a new town plan. After the First World War the area of the cemetery was cleared and industrial plants were built on the site. In 1888 two cemeteries, one Ashkenazi and one Sephardi, were consecrated in a formal ceremony on Mije Kovačevića Street, facing each other on either side of the road. The Sephardi cemetery is the larger of the two; as of the early 21st century it was maintained, and the inscriptions on its gravestones are in Hebrew, Ladino and Serbian. The Ashkenazi cemetery contains 200 gravestones with inscriptions in Hebrew, Serbian, Hungarian and German. In 1925 the two cemeteries were incorporated into the grounds of the adjacent Belgrade New Cemetery. In the mid-1920s a monument was erected there to the Jews of Belgrade who had fallen in Serbia's wars from the First Balkan War to the First World War, and in 1928 the gravestones of the community's rabbis were transferred from the old cemetery to the new one. The cemetery contains a genizah, begun in 1894, for which a marker was set up in 1931, as well as a monument to the victims of the Kladovo–Šabac affair.

== See also ==
- List of synagogues in Serbia

== Sources ==
- Almoslino, Shlomo (2005). The Community of Monastir (Bitola), Macedonia (in Hebrew). Jerusalem: The Zionist Library.
- Keshales, Haim (1967). The Jews in Bulgaria under Ottoman Rule. Encyclopaedia of the Diasporas: Bulgarian Jewry (in Hebrew). Jerusalem.
- Lebl, Ženi (2007). Until "the Final Solution": The Jews in Belgrade 1521–1942. Translated by Vidaković-Petrov, Krinka. Bergenfield, NJ: Avotaynu. ISBN 978-1-886223-33-2.
- Loker, Zvi, ed. (1988). Pinkas Hakehillot: Encyclopaedia of Jewish Communities, Yugoslavia (in Hebrew). Jerusalem: Yad Vashem. OCLC 21335811.
- Shelah, Menachem, ed. (1990). History of the Holocaust: Yugoslavia (in Hebrew). Jerusalem: Yad Vashem. OCLC 25048181.
- Heyd, Uriel (1973). Simon, Rachel; Porath, Yehoshua (eds.). Institutions of the Ottoman Empire (in Hebrew). Jerusalem: The Hebrew University, Institute of Asian and African Studies.
- Betzek, Jakob von (1979). Gesandtschaftsreise nach Ungarn und in die Türkei im Jahre 1564–65. Veröffentlichungen des Finnisch-Ugrischen Seminars an der Universität München, ser. C, vol. X (in German). Munich: Finnisch-Ugrisches Seminar..
- Miller, William (1936). The Ottoman Empire and Its Successors, 1801–1927. Cambridge University Press. OCLC 1045221.
- Freidenreich, Harriet Pass (1979). The Jews of Yugoslavia: A Quest for Community. Philadelphia: Jewish Publication Society of America. ISBN 978-0-8276-0124-6.
- Levinger, Yosef (1990). "The Jews of the Kingdom of Yugoslavia: an outline history of the community". In Shelah, Menachem (ed.). History of the Holocaust: Yugoslavia (in Hebrew). Jerusalem: Yad Vashem. pp. 19–28.
- Lebl, Ženi (1989). ""Sick with love of Jerusalem": Rabbi Judah Alkalai, the political and communal background to his work" (PDF). Pe'amim (in Hebrew) (40): 21–48.
