= Subotica Synagogue =

Former synagogue in Subotica, Serbia

- Суботичка синагога Szabadkai zsinagóga
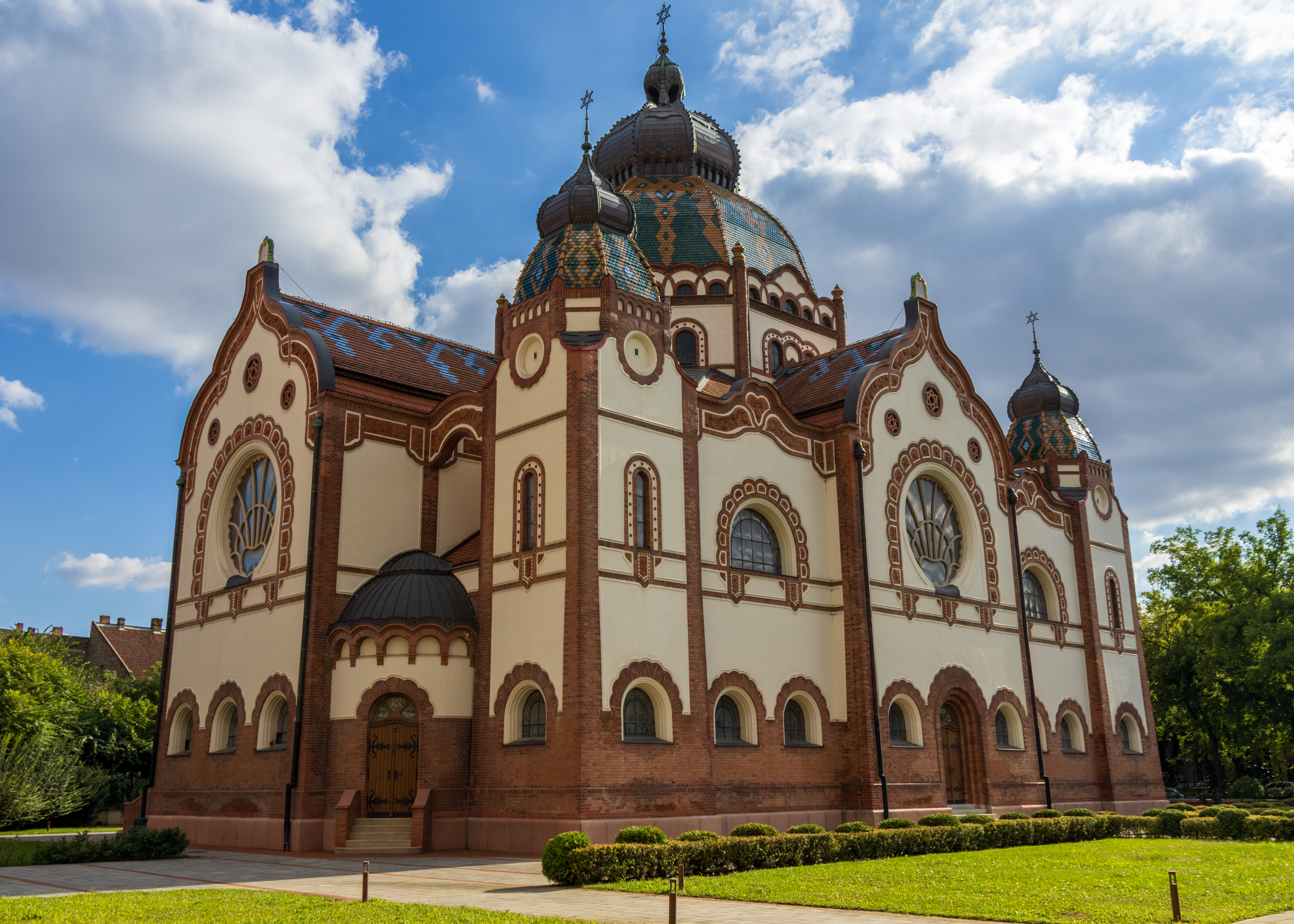
- Subotica Synagogue, pictured in 2020

Religion
- Affiliation: Neolog Judaism
- Rite: Nusach Ashkenaz
- Ecclesiastical or organisational status: Synagogue (1903–1976); Cultural center (2018–)
- Status: Closed (as a synagogue)

Location
- Location: Trg Jakaba i Komora 6, Subotica
- Country: Serbia
- Interactive map of Subotica Synagogue
- Coordinates: 46°06′13″N 19°40′04″E

Architecture
- Architects: Dezső Jakab; Marcell Komor
- Type: Synagogue architecture
- Style: Hungarian Secession; Hungarian Art Nouveau
- Established: c. 1890 (as a congregation)
- Groundbreaking: 1901
- Completed: 1903

Specifications
- Height (max): 40 m (130 ft)
- Dome: One
- Dome height (outer): 40 m (130 ft)
- Dome height (inner): 23 m (75 ft)
- Dome dia. (outer): 12.6 m (41 ft)

Cultural Heritage of Serbia
- Type: Cultural Monument of Exceptional Importance
- Designated: 1975
- Reference no.: СК 1035

The Subotica Synagogue (Serbian: Суботичка синагога; Hungarian: Szabadka zsinagóga), officially the Jakab and Komor Square Synagogue (Serbian: Синагога на тргу Јакаба и Комора; Hungarian: Jakab és Komor téri zsinagóga), is a former Neolog Jewish congregation and synagogue, located in Subotica, Serbia. It is the second largest synagogue building in Europe after the Dohány Street Synagogue in Budapest.

Renovated in a multi-million project and re-opened to public in 2018, the synagogue is repurposed to a cultural venue, available at the same time to the small local Jewish community as a synagogue for services.

The Subotica Synagogue was designated a national heritage site of great importance in 1974 and was elevated to national heritage site of exceptional importance 1990, and it is protected by the state.

A memorial at the front of the synagogue grounds commemorates 4,000 Jewish citizens of Subotica that were killed in the second world war.

== Architecture ==
Completed in 1903 in the Hungarian Art Nouveau style (Szecessió), the Subotica Synagogue is one of the finest surviving pieces of religious architecture in the art nouveau style and the only surviving Hungarian Art Nouveau Jewish place of worship in the world. Erected by a prosperous Jewish community, with approximately 3,000 members, between 1901 and 1903, it highlighted the double, Hungarian-Jewish identity of its builders, who lived in a multi-ethnic, but predominantly Roman Catholic city, which was at the time the third largest in the Kingdom of Hungary and the tenth largest in Austria-Hungary.

The Jewish community hired Dezső Jakab and Marcell Komor, who would later make a significant imprint on the architecture of Subotica and Palić, the resort town near the city. The architects were ardent followers of Ödön Lechner, the father of Hungarian Art Nouveau-style architecture, and later partisans of this movement, which unified Hungarian folklore elements with some Jewish structural principles and sometimes even Jewish motifs.

Besides lending the synagogue a distinct double identity in architectural terms, Jakab and Komor created a new space-conception of synagogue architecture in Hungary and deployed modern steel structure as well as an advanced technique of vaulting. Unlike period synagogues in Hungary that featured a predominantly basilica-like arrangement with a nave and two aisles, with or without a dome, this synagogue achieves a unified, tent-like central space under the sun, painted in gold on the apex of the dome. The women's gallery and the dome are supported by four pairs of steel pillars covered with gypsum with a palm leaf relief. The large dome is a self-supporting, 3-to-5-centimetre (1.2 to 2.0 in) thin shell-structure, formed in the spirit of Hungarian folklore. While many other synagogues utilized light structures, they usually mimicked traditional arches and vaults. The novelty of this synagogue is the sincere display of modern structure and modernity in general, of which Jews have been important advocates and generators.

== Gallery ==
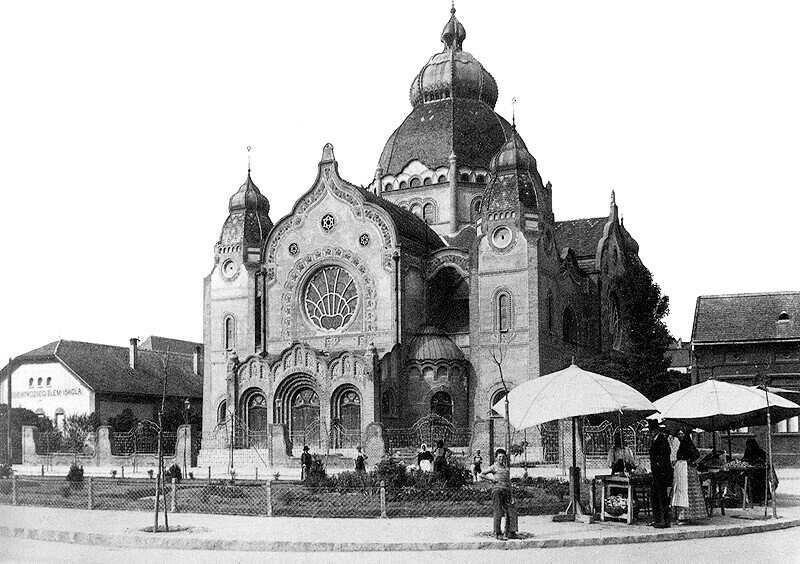
Synagogue in the early 20th century

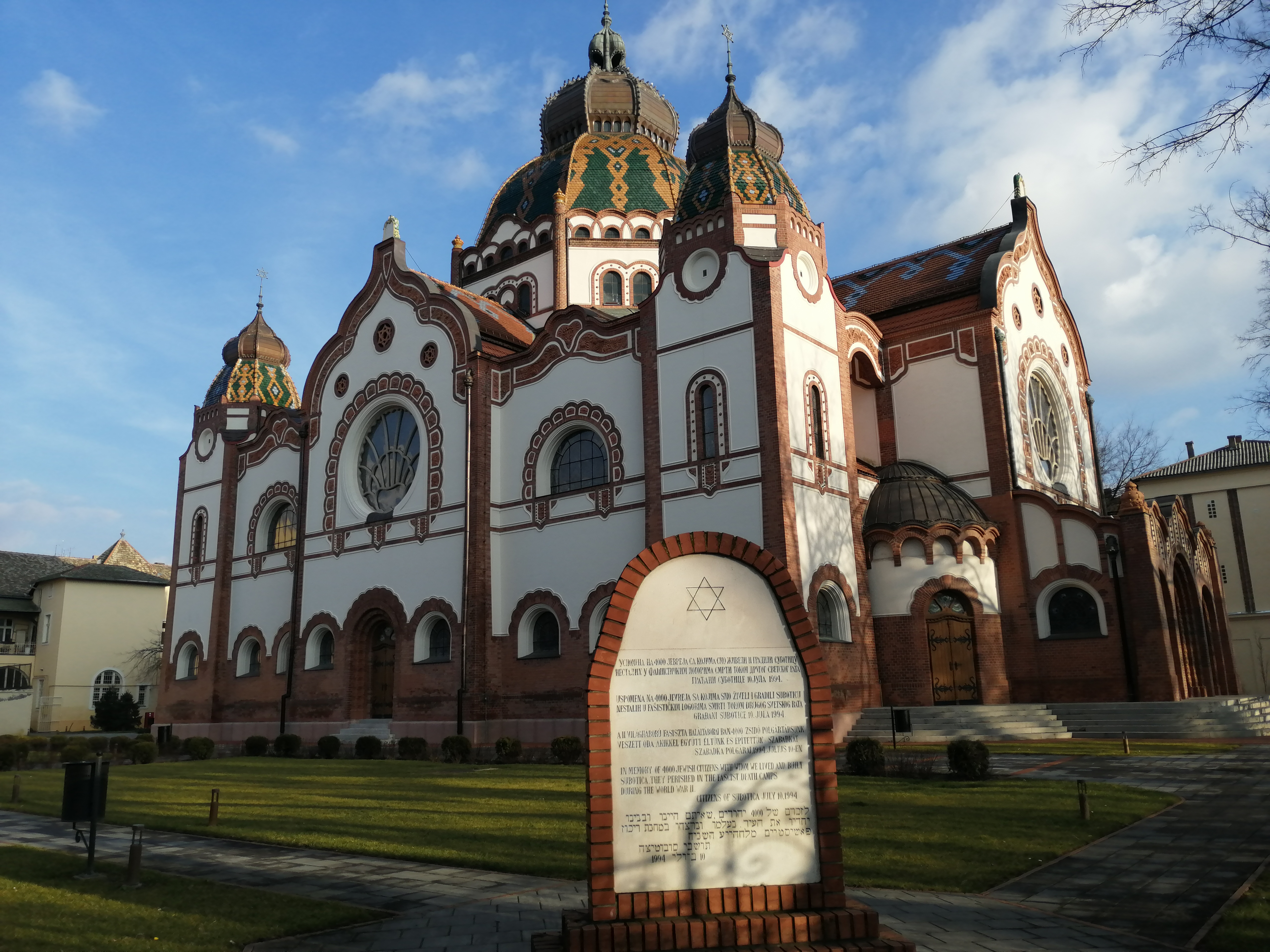
Synagogue exterior

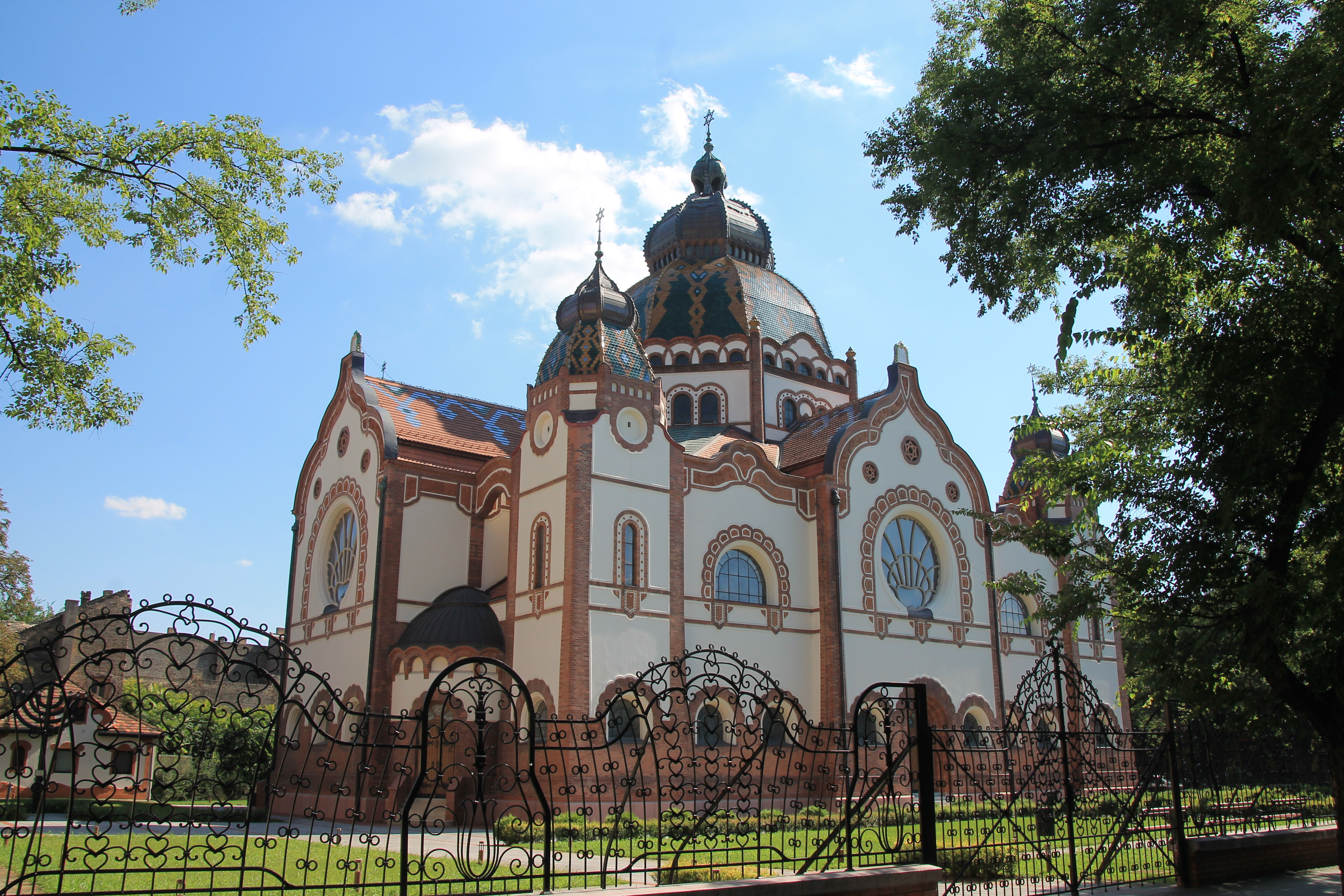
Synagogue exterior

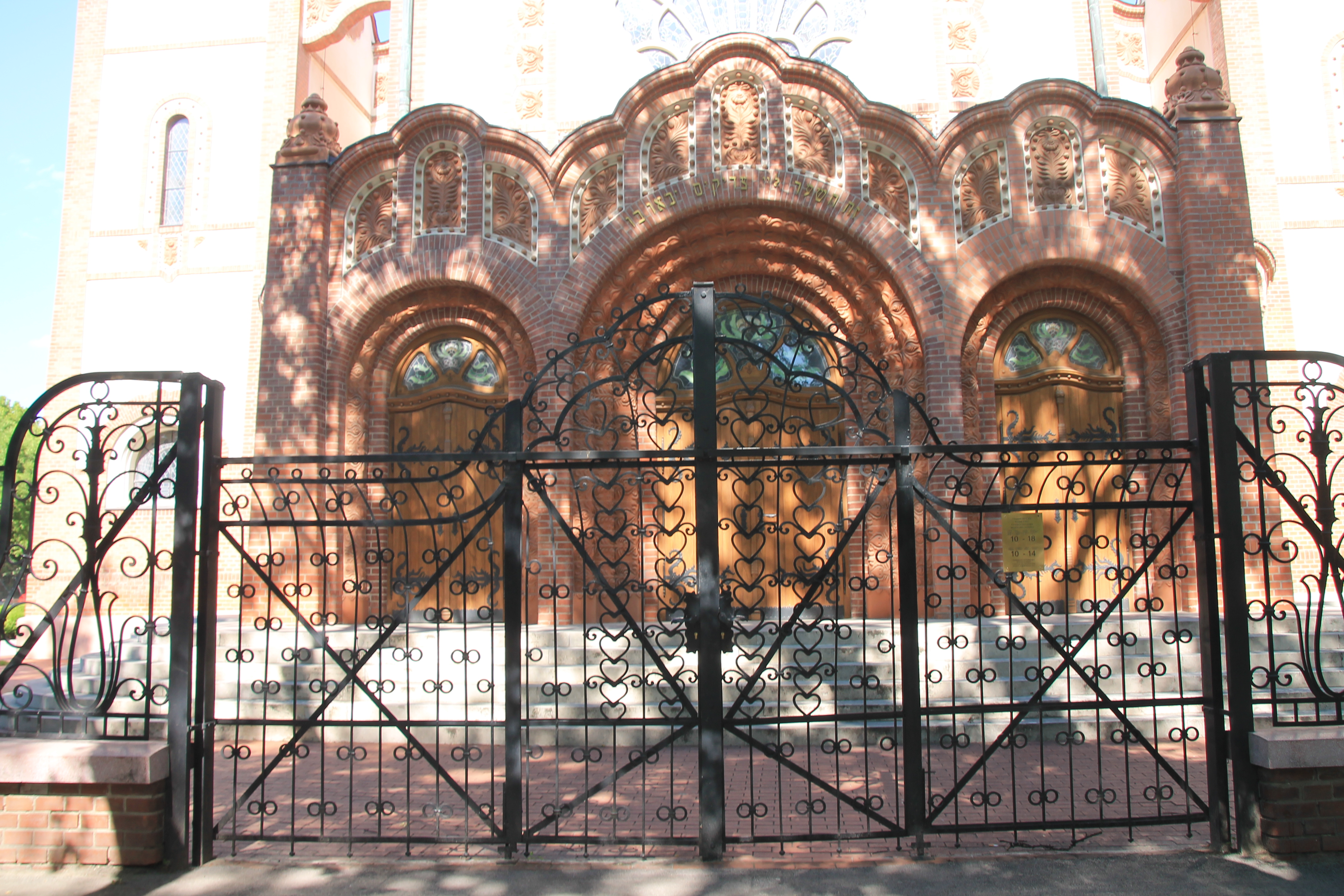
Main entrance
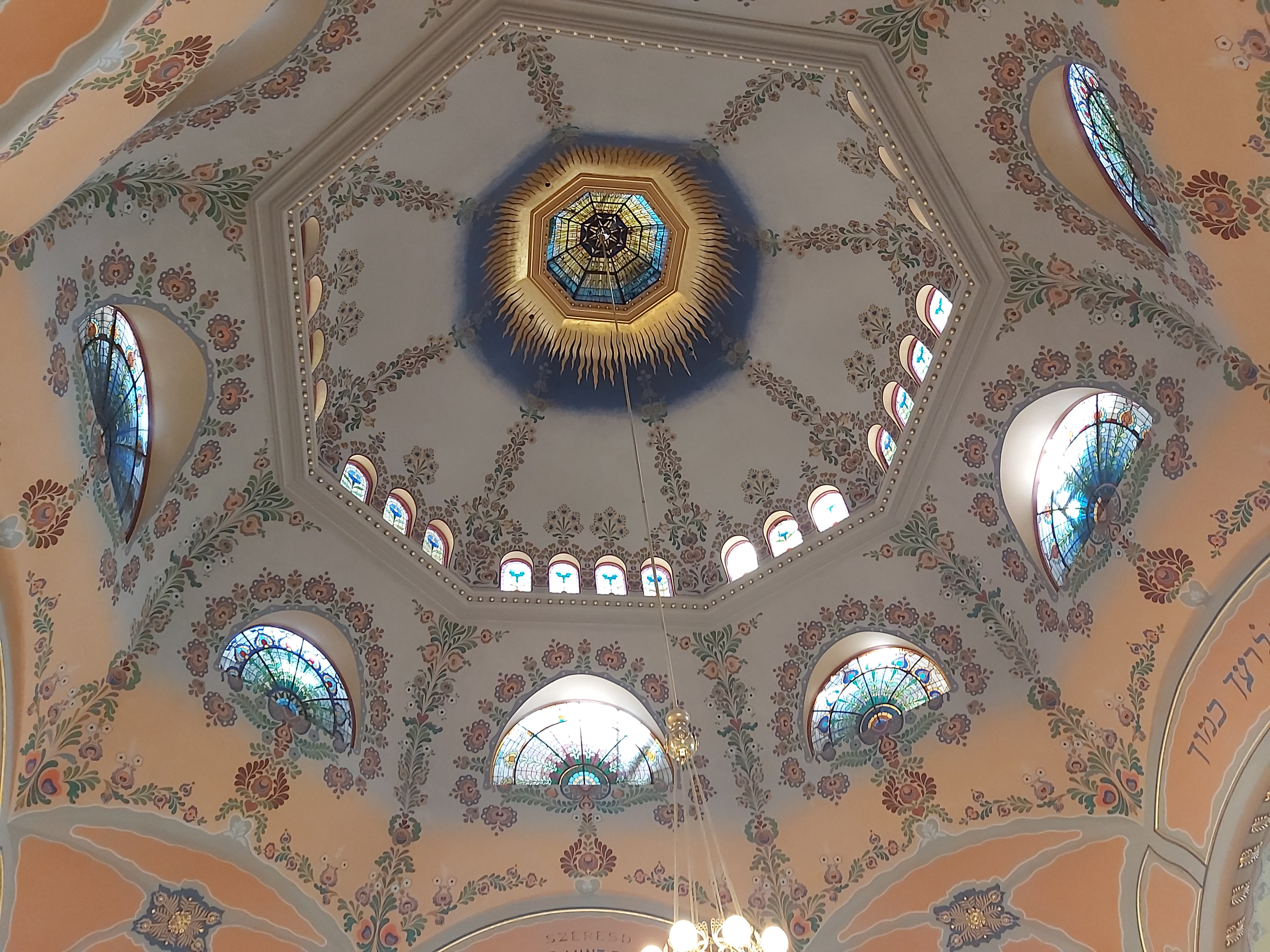
Dome

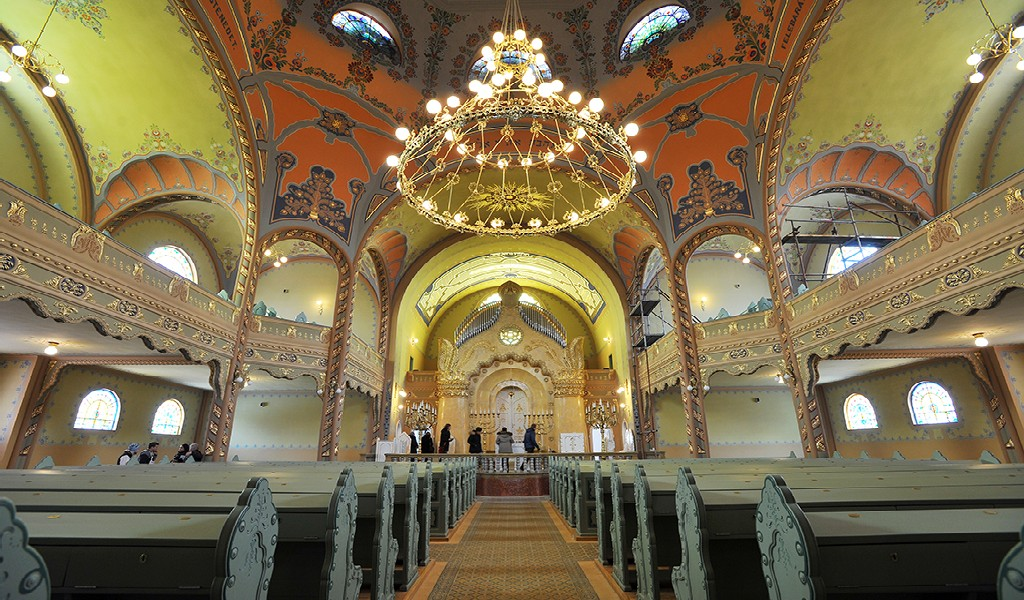
Interior

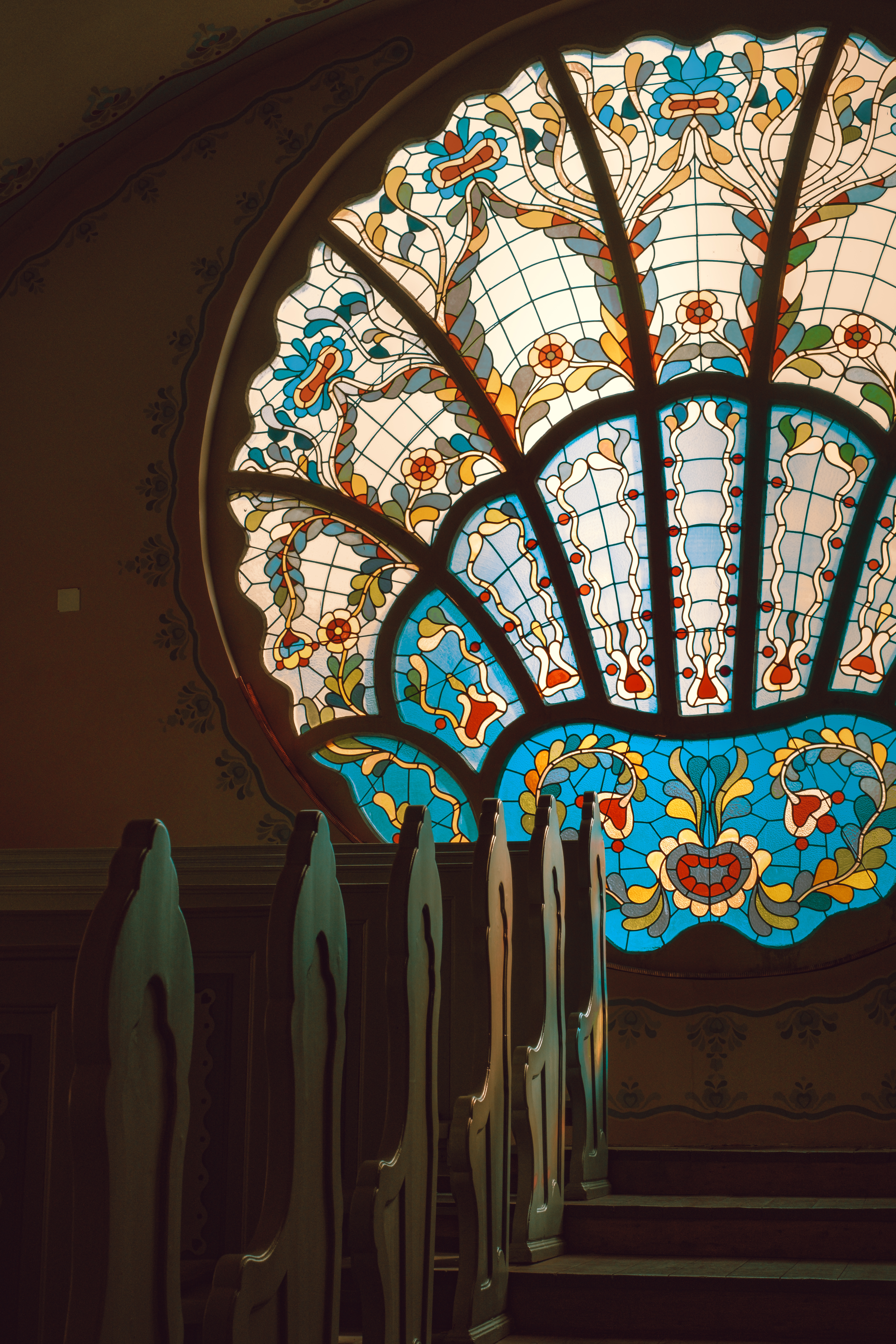
Stained glass window

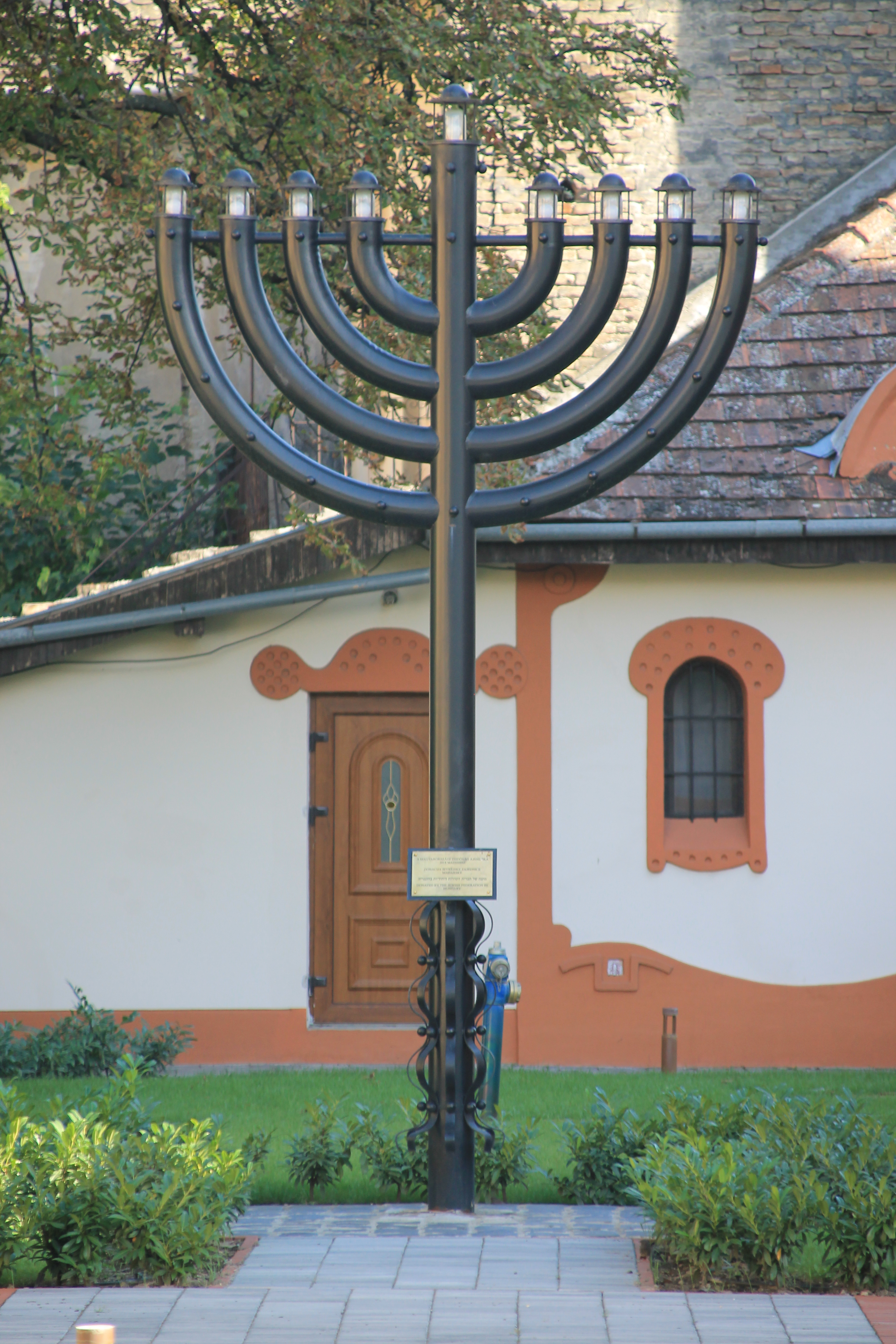
Menorah lamp

== See also ==
- List of synagogues in Serbia
- History of the Jews in Serbia
