= List of synagogues in Serbia =

This list of synagogues in Serbia contains active, otherwise used and destroyed synagogues in Serbia.

== City of Belgrade ==
Location	Name	Built	Status	Note	Image
Savski Venac	Chabad Synagogue	2008	standing		
Stari Grad	Belgrade Synagogue	1925	standing	The only functioning synagogue in the country.	
Stari Grad	Beth Israel Synagogue	1908	destroyed in 1941		
Stari Grad	El Kal Synagogue	17th century	destroyed in 1941		
Stari Grad	El Kal Nuevo Synagogue	before 1886	destroyed in 1910s		
Zemun	Zemun Synagogue	1850	standing	Repurposed to a cultural venue.	
Zemun	Zemun Sefardi Synagogue	1871	demolished in 1947		

== Central Banat District ==
Location	Name	Built	Status	Note	Image
Ečka	Ečka Synagogue	1870	destroyed in 1941		
Melenci	Melenci Synagogue		demolished after 1945		
Novi Bečej	Novi Bečej Synagogue	1871	demolished in 1946		
Novo Miloševo	Novo Miloševo Synagogue		demolished after 1945		
Srpski Itebej	Srpski Itebej Synagogue	1900s	destroyed in 1941		,
Torak	Torak Synagogue	1870	destroyed in 1941		
Zrenjanin	Zrenjanin Synagogue	1896	destroyed in 1941		

== Nišava District ==
Location	Name	Built	Status	Note	Image
Niš	Niš Synagogue	1925	standing	Repurposed to a cultural venue.	

== North Bačka District ==
Location	Name	Built	Status	Note	Image
Bačka Topola	Bačka Topola Synagogue		demolished after 1945		
Bajmok	Bajmok Synagogue	1896	demolished in 1955		
Bajša	Bajša Synagogue	19th c.	standing	Used as a residential building.	
Feketić	Feketić Synagogue	1900	Demolished in 1948		
Hajdukovo	Hajdukovo Synagogue		standing	Abandoned and in bad condition.	
Mali Iđoš	Mali Iđoš Synagogue	1926	demolished after 1945		
Pačir	Pačir Synagogue	1850	demolished in 1948		
Subotica	Subotica Synagogue	1903	standing	The second largest synagogue building in Europe. Repurposed to a cultural venue.	

== North Banat District ==
Location	Name	Built	Status	Note	Image
Ada	Ada Synagogue	1896	demolished in 1973		
Banatsko Aranđelovo	Banatsko Aranđelovo Synagogue	1880	demolished in 1948		
Čoka	Čoka Synagogue	1900	destroyed in 1941		
Horgoš	Horgoš Synagogue	1910	demolished in 1948		
Kanjiza	Kanjiza Synagogue	1861	demolished in 1948		
Kikinda	Kikinda Synagogue	1880	demolished in 1953		
Martonoš	Martonoš Synagogue	1880	demolished in 1949		
Mokrin	Mokrin Synagogue	1876	destroyed in 1941		
Mol	Mol Synagogue	1892	demolished in 1960		
Novi Kneževac	Novi Kneževac Synagogue	1910	demolished after 1945		
Padej	Padej Synagogue	1880	demolished in 1947		
Senta	Senta Synagogue	1874	demolished after 1945		
Senta	Senta Little Synagogue	1928	standing	Renovated and repurposed to a cultural venue.	
Stara Moravica	Stara Moravica Synagogue		demolished after 1945		

== Podunavlje District ==
Location	Name	Built	Status	Note	Image
Smederevo	Smederevo Synagogue	1857	destroyed in 1941		

== South Bačka District ==
Location	Name	Built	Status	Note	Image
Bač	Bač Synagogue	1750	demolished in 1980		
Bačka Palanka	Bačka Palanka Synagogue	1807	demolished in 1956		
Bački Petrovac	Bački Petrovac Synagogue	1905	demolished in 1962		
Bačko Petrovo Selo	Bačko Petrovo Selo Old Synagogue	1854	demolished in 1950		
Bačko Petrovo Selo	Bačko Petrovo Selo New Synagogue	1905	demolished in 1951		
Bačko Gradište	Bačko Gradište Synagogue	1890	demolished in 1955		
Čurug	Čurug Synagogue	1880	demolished in 1950		
Đurđevo	Đurđevo Synagogue	1900	demolished in 1948		
Gospođinci	Gospođinci Synagogue	1900	demolished in 1948		
Kisač	Kisač Synagogue	1900	demolished after 1945		
Kovilj	Kovilj Synagogue		demolished after 1945		
Kucura	Kucura Synagogue	1920	demolished after 1945		
Novi Sad	Novi Sad Synagogue	1909	standing	Repurposed to a cultural center.	
Novi Sad	Novi Sad Old Synagogue	1826			
Pivnice	Pivnice Synagogue	1900	destroyed in 1944		
Selenča	Selenča Synagogue		demolished after 1945		
Silbaš	Silbaš Synagogue	1900	demolished in 1948		
Stari Bečej	Stari Bečej Synagogue	1883	demolished in 1962		
Šajkaš	Šajkaš Synagogue				
Temerin	Temerin Synagogue	1878	demolished in 1947		
Titel	Titel Synagogue	1900	demolished in 1950		
Tovariševo	Tovariševo Synagogue	1900	demolished in 1948		
Vrbas	Vrbas Synagogue	1914	demolished in 1948	The tablets with Ten Commandments were moved and installed in a new synagogue in Karmiel (Israel).	
Zmajevo	Zmajevo Synagogue		demolished after 1945		
Žabalj	Žabalj Synagogue		demolished after 1945		

== South Banat District ==
Location	Name	Built	Status	Note	Image
Bela Crkva	Bela Crkva Synagogue	1898	demolished in 1950		
Debeljača	Debeljača Synagogue	1895	destroyed in 1941		
Kovačica	Kovačica Synagogue				
Pančevo	Pančevo Synagogue	1909	demolished in 1954		
Srbobran	Srbobran Synagogue	1900	demolished in 1956		
Vršac	Vršac Synagogue	1828	demolished in 1966		

== West Bačka District ==
Location	Name	Built	Status	Note	Image
Apatin	Apatin Synagogue	1885	standing	Abandoned and in bad condition.	
Bački Brestovac	Bački Brestovac Synagogue		demolished after 1945		
Bezdan	Bezdan Synagogue	1807	demolished in 1948		
Čonoplja	Čonoplja Synagogue	1763	demolished in 1948		
Crvenka	Crvenka Synagogue		demolished in 1948		
Kula	Kula Synagogue	1861	demolished in 1948		
Prigrevica	Prigrevica Synagogue	1880	demolished in 1948		
Ratkovo	Ratkovo Synagogue	1870	demolished in 1948		
Riđica	Riđica Synagogue	1900	demolished in 1948		
Sivac	Sivac Synagogue	1878	demolished in 1948		
Sombor	Sombor Neolog Synagogue	1865	standing	Used as administrative building for municipal utility company.	
Sombor	Sombor Orthodox Synagogue	1925			
Sonta	Sonta Synagogue	1900	demolished in 1948		
Stanišić	Stanišić Synagogue	1870	demolished in 1950		

== Srem District ==
Location	Name	Built	Status	Note	Image
Banoštor	Banoštor Synagogue		demolished after 1945		
Erdevik	Erdevik Synagogue		demolished after 1945		
Inđija	Inđija Synagogue	1903	destroyed in 1943		
Ruma	Ruma Synagogue	1935	destroyed in 1943		
Sremska Mitrovica	Sremska Mitrovica Synagogue	1904	destroyed in 1941		
Stara Pazova	Stara Pazova Synagogue	1903	destroyed in 1942		
Šid	Šid Synagogue	1900	destroyed in 1942		

== Šumadija District ==
Location	Name	Built	Status	Note	Image
Kragujevac	Kragujevac Synagogue	1930			

== Zaječar District ==
Location	Name	Built	Status	Note	Image
Debelica	Debelica Synagogue	19th century	standing		

== See also ==
- History of the Jews in Serbia

== Sources ==
- "Serbia". Jewish Postcards. Frantisek Banyai. n.d.
