= El Kal Synagogue =

Former synagogue in Belgrade, Serbia

Coordinates: 44.8261°N 20.4572°E

El Kal Vježu (Judaeo-Spanish: Old Synagogue; Hebrew: בית הכנסת קהל ישן בבלגרד), also known as Dorćol Synagogue, was a Sephardic synagogue in Belgrade and one of the oldest synagogues in the Balkans.

== History ==
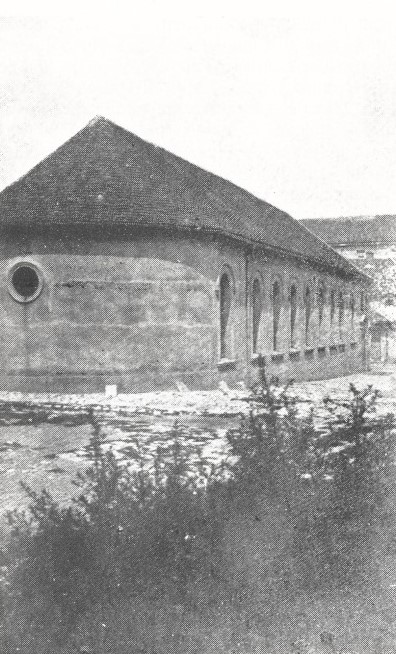
El Kal Synagogue

First reliable records of Jews living in Belgrade date to the mid 10th century with it being likely that they had an organized community. Due to the Alhambra Decree and subsequent persecution and pogroms, Spanish Jews fled the Iberian Peninsula with a large number of them fleeing to North Africa and Europe and they brought with them the Ladino (language) and their culture. A significant amount of them ended up moving to the Ottoman Empire and had started settling in the Balkans by the 16th century. Dorćol Jewish community was established around the middle of 16th century and had a Talmud Torah, and due to the efforts of Rabin Juda Lerma, a Yeshiva was established in Belgrade in the 17th century. Before the fall of Belgrade into Austrian hands in 1688, there were around 800 Sephardic Jews living there. They fled with the Ottomans and returned two years later when the Ottoman Empire recaptured the city.

Even though there was a prohibition of building new prayer houses, the Jewish community was granted a permit to build a synagogue in the 17th century, which was known by the locals as El Kal Vježu. It was reconstructed numerous times during its existence, several reconstructions were due to fires, in 1752, 1790, 1795, and 1806, with the last major reconstruction being finished in 1819, after which the synagogue remained mostly unchanged until being heavily damaged in World War II and its demolition in the 1950s.

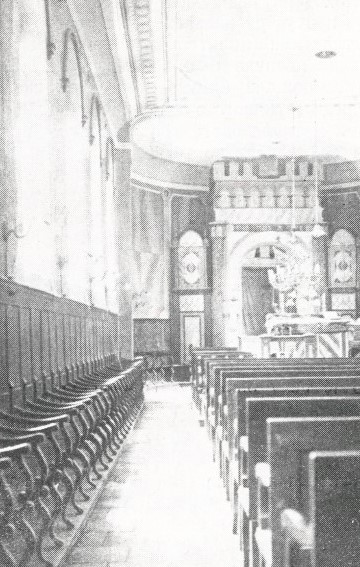
Interior of the synagogue

The synagogue was believed to be completely destroyed until 2018 when archaeologists uncovered its foundations underneath a parking lot and a dilapidated basketball court.

It is also said that there are remains of an even older synagogue, possibly from the 16th century, underneath the foundations of this building, however this remains unconfirmed.

== Architecture ==
The synagogue was a spacious building with unevenly laid stone and thin brick foundations, typical of the time, measuring roughly 20x9 meters which remained unchanged after the first reconstruction and brick floor. The original look or the Torah ark, along with the original look and placement of the Bimah (platform) are unknown. The reconstruction in the late 18th century added the apse at the southern side which featured the Torah ark and expanded the building size to around 36x9 meters. It added an extension to the northern part. The final reconstruction, which was finished in 1819, featured redesigning and refurbishing the synagogue's interior, among other things. Afterwards, the synagogue remained mostly unchanged until its aforementioned demolition in the 1950s.

== See also ==
- History of the Jews in Serbia
- List of synagogues in Serbia
