= Kladovo transport =

The Kladovo Transport was, according to the British government, an "illegal" Jewish refugee transport of 822 Jewish refugees (whose numbers subsequently grew to about 1,100), which started in Vienna on 25 November 1939. Its aim was to flee from the Nazis by travelling down the Danube River on a journey that would hopefully take them to Eretz Israel (i.e., the Land of Israel which at that time was called British Mandatory Palestine). The refugees overwintered in the Yugoslav river-port of Kladovo because of an early freeze-up of the Danube. As 1940 progressed, they waited in vain for a sea-going vessel to continue their journey via the Black Sea. In September 1940, they were forcibly moved by the Yugoslav government to the port of Šabac on the Sava River, where they were subsequently caught by the Nazis in April 1941 and imprisoned in the Šabac concentration camp. Only about 200 young people and a few adults were able to be saved or escape on their own. In October 1941, the men of the transport were transported ~40 km to a farmer's field near the village of Zasavica and shot on 12 and 13 October by units of the Wehrmacht on the orders of General Franz Böhme. In late January 1942, the women and children were transferred to the Sajmište concentration camp, where they were subsequently murdered between 19 March and 10 May 1942 in a gas van, by order of the camp commander Herbert Andorfer.

== Background ==
In 1917, the Balfour Declaration by the British government supported establishing a Jewish homeland in British Mandatory Palestine and promised the possibility of legal immigration (Aliyah). However, immigration became limited, starting in the 1920s, by the British introduction of a Jewish immigration quota system. Only those Jews who managed to get British immigration certificates were allowed to legally immigrate. In the 1930s, Zionist organizations responded with the implementation of clandestine (i.e., "illegal" according to the British authorities) transports (Aliya Bet). At the turn of 1938/1939, the Haganah in British Mandatory Palestine established the Mossad LeAliyah Bet organization which planned and implemented the clandestine transports. Between the March 1938 Anschluss, i.e., the annexation of Austria to the German Reich and the beginning of the Second World War, ~17,000 people in 50 clandestine transports left Europe.

With the annexation of Austria by the German Reich in March 1938, the Nuremberg Laws were adopted overnight. The aggressive policy of expulsion by the Nazis allowed Jews to emigrate to a foreign refuge. Although Austrian Jews were largely assimilated, they supported Jewish emigration financially and morally, without thinking of their own emigration. The Viennese branch of the Zionist organization Hechaluz, which had existed since the 1920s, actively helped Eastern European Jews passing through Austria on their journey to British Mandatory Palestine.

In July 1938, Ralph Weingarten attended the international Évian Conference for Jewish refugees wishing to flee from Nazi Germany and afterward described his impression of the proceedings:

Both sides, "receiving" countries and expulsion country wished basically the same thing: this disturbing, annoying minority to deport, somewhere, far away, to sink them in any remote corner of the earth, to make them disappear somewhere.

In May 1939, the British government published the "White Paper of 1939" which specified that immigration of Jews into British Mandatory Palestine for the next five years would be limited to 75,000. Other countries also limited the immigration of Jews drastically.

It became increasingly difficult for Jews to escape the threat of the Nazis, as the Nazi sphere of influence grew. Clandestine ("illegal") immigration to Palestine became more and more important, as the organization of transports had been hampered by the outbreak of war. An additional complication was that the British government considered Jewish refugees from hostile (primarily German) areas to be "enemy aliens".

In the fall of 1939, Adolf Eichmann, one of the major organizers of the Holocaust and founder of the Central Agency for Jewish Emigration in Vienna, put pressure on Georg Überall, Secretary General of the Austrian Hechaluz (a Zionist youth movement). Eichmann threatened that all Hechaluz members who had not yet emigrated (there were hundreds waiting in the Hachshara camps outside Vienna for their departure) with deportation to Poland if they did not leave the country. In addition, he ordered the creation of the "Committee for Jewish Overseas Transport" and appointed Berthold Storfer as its head. Although Storfer was a Jew, he was not a Zionist, and in 1939, with support from the SS (Schutzstaffel, a major Nazi paramilitary organization), he became increasingly influential in the organization of, according to the British government, "illegal" transport. The Hechalutz representatives saw him as a collaborator of the Nazis and avoided contact, thereby ultimately leading to failure of the project.

== Organization of transport ==
In the face of threats by Eichmann, Überall decided to dissolve the Hechaluz centers as soon as possible and to send its members out of the country. The plan was to travel by ship down the Danube River to Sulina (Romania), near the river's mouth on the Black Sea, and then transfer to a larger ship that would take them to British Mandatory Palestine. The Mossad LeAliyah Bet agent Moshe Agami gave his assent to the planned transport. Ferdinand Ceipek, a former National Socialist, supported the Jewish rescue attempts and helped obtain 800 regular entry visas to Slovakia. In spite of intensive efforts in Italy, Greece, Romania and Bulgaria by Mossad LeAliyah Bet agents who were stationed in these countries, no passenger ship could be easily obtained to pick up the refugees who would arrive at Sulina.

For the first time, an "illegal" transport was also allocated to groups of the Youth Aliya (Aliyat HaNo'ar), a Jewish organization that rescued thousands of Jewish children from the Nazis during the Third Reich. This decision was very controversial; the director of the Vienna Youth Aliyah, Aron Menczer, defended the decision. In a letter to a friend that he wrote shortly after the departure of the Vienna group, he stated that there was no other way, that the risk had been assessed, and it was too good to pass up. The entire group (totaling 822 refugees) to be transported was approximately one third children and adolescents up to the age of 17, of which half were accompanied by their parents, and the rest in the care of Zionist youth associations. Another third were the 18-to-35-year-old members of the Hechaluz. The remainder was made up of veteran Zionists, who had previously been waiting in vain for British entry certificates because of their age, as well as couples, and individual Jews who were still able to pay a significant amount for the trip despite the political circumstances. Equally mixed were the participants with regard to their social origins; they represented the entire spectrum of the Jews of Central Europe, and their religiosity also ranged from Orthodox to moderately traditional to atheistic.

== Journey ==
On 25 November 1939, the 822 Austrians selected for transport to British Mandatory Palestine were brought by train from Vienna to Bratislava. They could bring only a backpack with personal belongings, which could not exceed more than eight kilos, and ten Reichsmark in foreign exchange (according to the Nazi "emigration tax" policy).

Arriving in Bratislava, they were interned in the abandoned munitions factory ("Patronka") and a former bachelor quarters ("Slobodrna") and guarded by members of the Slovak fascist Hlinka Guard. They received provisions from the local Jewish community. The group grew with the addition of 130 refugees from Berlin, 50 from Danzig and about 100 from Prague and Bratislava. While the Danube had already threatened to freeze over, they stayed in their quarters while waiting to find out about a connection for the onward journey. The Slovak authorities presented an ultimatum in which the group would be returned to the German border if they did not leave soon. After about ten days, they were brought to the port in buses and were able to board the Danube Steamship Shipping Company (DDSG) river steamship called the Uranus, flying the swastika flag. In the next few hours after the first lunch, all of the refugees had severe diarrhea, which led to the speculation that they had been poisoned.

The Uranus with its ~1,100 Jewish refugees embarked on its journey down the Danube River on 8 December. The ship proceeded only as far as Gyor, Hungary where the transport was stopped by the ship-owners and returned to Bratislava because the ship-owners refused to allow their steamship to continue onward when they discovered that there was no ship waiting (as had been previously promised) at Sulina; the ship-owners feared that the passengers would refuse to disembark in Sulina and their steamship would therefore become unavailable for other planned trips. It took two days to persuade the ship-owners to allow the Uranus to continue on its journey. They finally agreed when they were assured that the Uranus would need to sail just past the point where the Danube River entered Yugoslavia where the refugees would transfer to three Yugoslav riverboats.

The second departure from Bratislava took place on 13 December. The passengers were then transferred mid-river near Bezdan to three small Yugoslav riverboats named the "Car Nikola II" (i.e., Czar or Emperor Nicholas II), "Car Dušan" (i.e., Czar or Emperor Dušan), and "Kraljica Marija" (i.e., Queen Maria). These were chartered at premium rates on behalf of Mossad agent Moshe Agami by the "Association of Jewish Communities of the Kingdom of Yugoslavia." Via the three riverboats, the refugees sailed to Prahovo, where they were moored from 18 to 30 December because they were denied passage past the Yugoslav border with Romania. Meanwhile, the weather conditions made an onward journey impossible because the Danube River iced up, so the riverboats sailed ~70km upstream back to Kladovo (a village with ~3,000 people), where they were to spend the winter. The General Secretary of the Federation of Jewish Communities of the Kingdom of Yugoslavia, Sime Spitzer, through the Yugoslav government, had to commit the Federation of Jewish Communities to take responsibility for the group's accommodations. The Jewish communities, however, were already strained by the influx of refugees who had been coming from Germany and Austria after 1933 and the Anschluss in 1938. In addition, the Kladovo port could be reached in the winter only via a 24-hour trip (due to its remote location and the winter conditions) that included a seven-hour sleigh ride, as the nearest railway station was 54 km away. Despite the circumstances, Spitzer promised to provide tolerable living conditions for the refugees.

== Time in Kladovo ==
The refugees had to stay onboard because the Yugoslavian government barred them from going ashore. Since the riverboats were designed for summer day trips and did not have bedrooms or a genuine kitchen, the refugees lived on the riverboats under terribly overcrowded conditions for the next few months without anything meaningful to do. The riverboats had no heating systems, most people had to sleep on the floors or on benches, they had to wait in long lines for food, and since there were only a handful of toilets, they also had to wait in long lines to use the lavatory.

The Yugoslavian government then agreed to improve the living conditions of the refugees. Around mid-January 1940, a converted river barge named the Penelope (rented by the Federation of Jewish Communities of Yugoslavia) was added to help alleviate the cramped living conditions on the three riverboats. This barge was modified to have two kitchens, an eating area and sleeping quarters with wooden bunks that were installed in her five bunker rooms. In addition, there were five lavatories. But the barge had no electrical power. After a few weeks, the refugees were given permission to use a narrow shoreline for walking under the guard of gendarmes.

In mid-March 1940, Rose Jacobs and delegates of the American Jewish women's organization called Hadassah, during a trip to Europe, noted the arduous journey of the Kladovo group and expressed shock at the situation in a letter:

[...] What a sight, what a story! Every one of the travelers is a tragedy in itself and - in addition - the symbol of the tragedy of a people.

Jacobs was of the opinion that it was only due to the intense cold that no epidemics had broken out - it was one of the coldest winters of the century. She observed that the refugees on board had, among other activities, already set up a shoe and clothing repair shop, published their own newspapers and taught Hebrew and English courses. By the end of March, the riverboats were moved to Kladovo's summer port. Through its proximity to the town, some refugees who were given a pass could now move more freely for the first time in four months.

After 4 months docked at Kladovo, the three riverboats sailed away because the Yugoslav River Transport Company required them for their regular summer schedule. Some Polish and German Jews joined the group, so by now the total number was ~1,200 refugees. With the approval of the Yugoslavian Interior Minister, most of the refugees moved into Kladovo homes and to nearby villages, where they were able to live in farmers' houses; some of the refugees (primarily members of the Zionist youth organization) lived in tents or quickly built shacks or on the Penelope. Despite the challenges that they faced, they were able to organize a small Jewish school in Kladovo. Malnutrition and a malaria outbreak (originating from nearby swamps) contributed to making the living conditions very difficult for the refugees and some people contracted typhus; some even contracted polio and were sent to a hospital in Belgrade. In letters to their relatives, the refugees praised the hospitality of the official authorities in Yugoslavia and that the population was very decent.

On 12 May, Sime Spitzer and Chief Rabbi David Alcalay came from Belgrade and held a general meeting with the refugees on a sports field, where they praised the refugees for their perseverance and courage and promised that they would still reach their destination. A train was to reach Kladovo within 24 hours to bring them to the Black Sea, where they could board a passenger ship at the port of Sulina. But the promise was never kept. Subsequently, there were many rumors about an imminent next trip, but they were all canceled at the last moment.

In late May 1940, a ship named the Darien II was purchased by the Mossad LeAliyah Bet (with funds provided by the U.S.-based Joint Distribution Committee) to transport the Kladovo Group from Sulina to British Mandatory Palestine. The ship first had to be renovated in Istanbul for carrying the large group of refugees; it was finally sent to Sulina in early December 1940 to save the Kladovo Group. The Darien II waited at Sulina for the Kladovo Group throughout December, but the plan was ultimately unsuccessful because the refugees were unable to get to Sulina in December for several reasons. Among the reasons was the decision by the Danube Steamship Shipping Company, on 5 December, to cancel a contracted riverboat trip for the refugees to travel from Kladovo down the Danube River due, in part, to the uncertain political situation; in addition, winter weather started to once again cause ice to build up on the river. As a result, the Kladovo Group never reached Sulina to board the Darien II. Had the refugees reached Sulina, they might have all been saved.

In September 1940, a large "illegal" transport called the Storfer transport sailed right past Kladovo; it was the last one that managed to leave the territory of the German Reich. The ships Helios, Melk, Palace and Uranus did not stop to pick up the Kladovo Group. As they watched from the shore, the Kladovo Group must have felt very upset as those riverboats sailed without any hindrance toward Sulina.

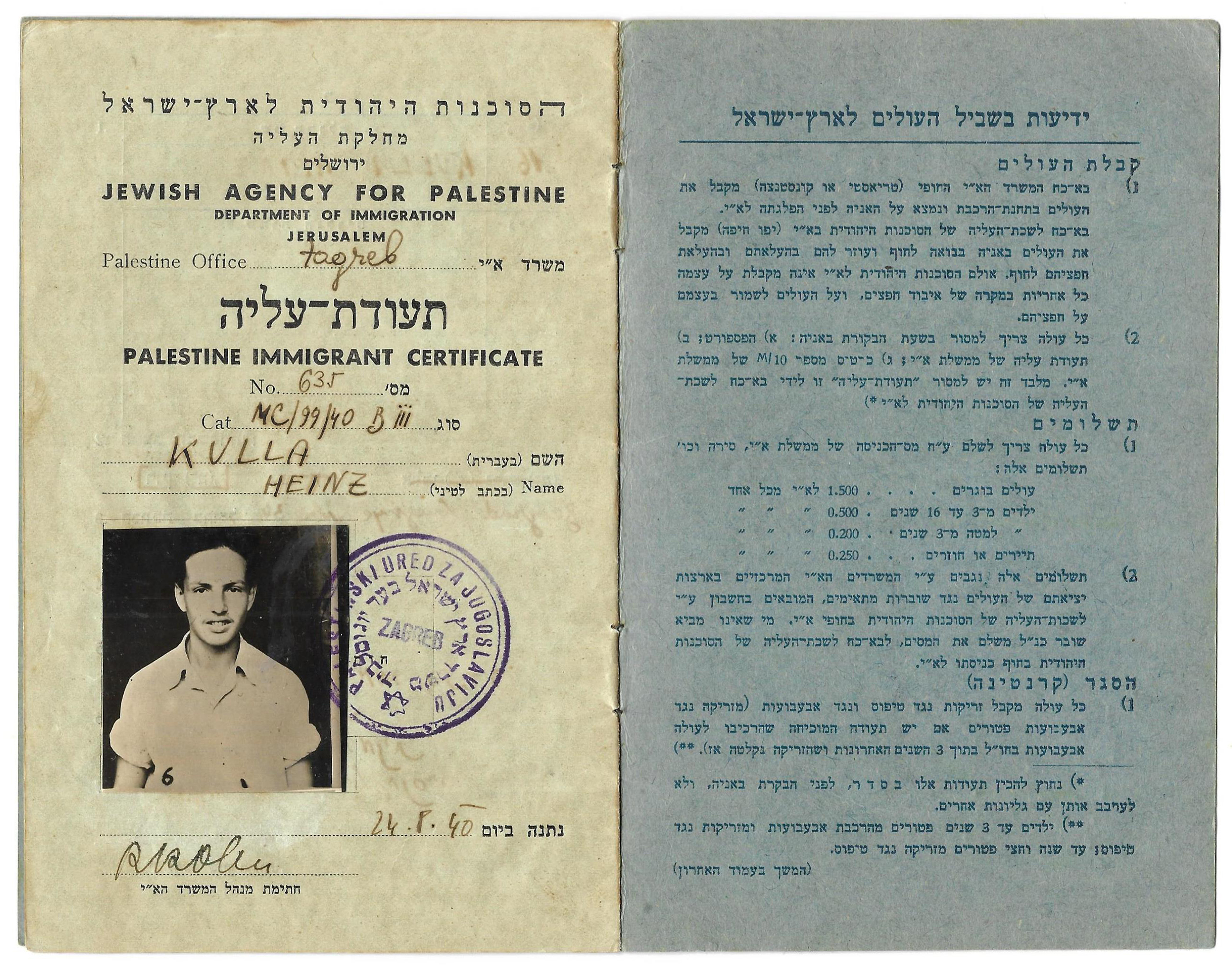
1940 JAFP immigration certificate issued to a 16-year-old who survived the transport

== Relocation to Šabac ==
From 19 to 22 September 1940, the refugees were forcibly moved by the Yugoslav authorities upstream ~330 km by three barges (including the Penelope) that were towed by tugboats past Belgrade to a small city named Šabac, located on the Sava River. It must have been disheartening for the refugees to see that they were once again sailing in the opposite direction, even farther away from their original destination. This transfer was ordered by the Yugoslav government because the Yugoslav authorities feared that hostilities might occur between the Jewish refugees and ethnic Germans ("Volksdeutsche") who were moving into the Kladovo area from Romanian regions (Bessarabia and North Bukovina) that Romania (with Germany approval) was forced to give to the Soviet Union.

In Šabac (located in the Yugoslavian province called Serbia), couples (including some with infants) and older people were housed with local citizens all over the city in private furnished rooms, while the majority of the young people (members of the Aliyat HaNo'ar) moved into an abandoned three-story former flour mill. Various other Zionist youth associations lived in another building, and the religious Zionist organization Mizrachi lived in a smaller house. In addition to bedrooms, all the buildings were equipped with shared kitchens. The center of the camp was a building block in which additional clothes, material and food warehouses were available and various workshops could be used for retraining courses. There were also administrative offices and the office of a representative of the Jewish community federation in the building. Another building (an abandoned sanatorium) was turned into a small hospital (with 20 beds and a pharmacy) that was staffed with eleven physicians (nine of whom were members of the Kladovo Group and two were local doctors) and a dentist. Although the Association of Yugoslav Jewish Communities was formally responsible for them, they were able to largely manage themselves. Testimonies from survivors described that the local Serbians were very friendly toward the Kladovo Group. The mayor of Šabac, Mr. Miodrag Petrović, played a key role in welcoming the refugees to Šabac and looking after some of their needs; he even hosted three families in his home.

In Šabac, the living conditions for the refugees improved and they were able to live reasonably normal lives. For example, they could go to the municipal library and to the movie theatre, and they organized a variety of cultural activities (e.g., music concerts and German and Yiddish theatre groups), sports activities, as well as public lectures. They organized a communal Chanukah celebration, and the small Jewish school (6 teachers and about 30 students) that they had started in Kladovo became more well-established. Although they were not allowed to officially accept any work, some still earned a little pocket money. Some of the refugees asked their relatives by letter for help in obtaining British immigration certificates to Palestine or about immigration channels to the United States, and even contacted the local Palestinian authorities and the Jewish Agency (an organization that encouraged immigration of Jews in diaspora to the Land of Israel).

From the time that the refugees became stranded in Kladovo until the German invasion of Yugoslavia, the expenses of the refugees continued to be paid by the "Federation of Jewish Communities in Yugoslavia" primarily with money provided by the U.S.-based Joint Distribution Committee. The Secretary General of the Federation, Šime Spitzer, worked tirelessly to try to help the refugees throughout their months in Kladovo and Šabac. The Ashkenazi and Sephardi communities in Belgrade initiated a charity drive for money (which raised 33,000 dinars) and collected donations of clothes, shoes, books, prayer books, etc., which were sent in 15 large crates to the refugees in Šabac. During the months before Germany's invasion of Yugoslavia, more Jewish refugees reached Šabac and the group increased in number to a total of ~1,400 refugees.

During their months living in Šabac, the refugees were repeatedly promised by their leaders that their trip down the Danube River toward the Black Sea would resume soon on the same three riverboats that took them originally to Kladovo. The onward journey was announced several times. But each time, after packing their belongings, the planned journey was always canceled at the last minute; survivors reported that there were rumors about the reasons, but nobody knew the real reasons which were complex. It was a very frustrating time for the refugees.

Since the arrival of the refugees in Šabac, Spitzer was continually trying to find new ways and means for further transport of the group of refugees. He organized in mid-December a special train to Prahovo, to send them from there by Romanian trains to Sulina. However, when the train came with a Greek flag, he saw in it a risk that was too big for him to take, as he wrote to the Mossad agent Ruth Klüger:

For this, we are an institution that is much too responsible. [...] For each case, I had to also keep in mind that the Romanian authorities could cause difficulties or that the (transport of) people in Romania could get stuck in the ice. [...] I could not even enforce a return to Yugoslavia ...

== Escape ==
Just three weeks before the 6 April 1941 German invasion of Yugoslavia, approximately 200 (but estimates range from 150 to 280) members of the Aliyat HaNo'ar (Youth Aliyah) organization in the Kladovo Group, mostly between the ages of 15 and 17, along with their group leaders and a few other adults, miraculously received British visas to enter British Mandatory Palestine. They received Yugoslav travel documents, and obtained visas to travel through Greece, Turkey and Syria on their way to British Mandatory Palestine. The young people received new clothes from WIZO and were provided with food and other items necessary for the journey.

Beginning on 16 March, they quickly left Šabac in several consecutive groups (of approximately 30 to 50 persons per group) on trains that took them on a journey through Greece, Istanbul, Aleppo and Beirut to finally reach Haifa three weeks later. It was emotionally difficult for the teenagers to say goodbye to their parents and their older and younger siblings. It was especially difficult for the parents to say goodbye to their teenage children, not knowing what might happen to them; neither the parents nor their teenage children knew at that time that they would never again see each other.

At the stops along the route, there were Jews who had learned of their passing and graciously supplied them with food and drinks. Because of the bombing of train tracks in Greece and other challenges, the journey to Istanbul by train took one week. In Istanbul, the group met in a hotel, and continued the journey by train to the Syrian city of Aleppo and then onward to Beirut. At the Rosh Hanikra grottoes, they reached the border of British Mandatory Palestine. After a stay in a British military detention camp, they were distributed to various settlements in the country, mostly kibbutzim, or they joined relatives already living in the country.

== After the invasion of Yugoslavia ==
The German army (Wehrmacht) invaded Yugoslavia on 6 April 1941, an event which sealed the fate of the Jewish refugees in Šabac. The Yugoslav government capitulated on April 17 and Serbia was placed under direct German military administration. After 16 fruitless and frustrating months of trying to escape from the Nazis, the remaining members of the Kladovo Group were captured when German troops entered Šabac on 12 April (which happened to be the first day of Passover). By the end of the war, only a handful of them managed to escape and survive.

On 10 May, the Nazis ordered all Jews to wear yellow armbands displaying the word Jude (or, according to other sources, the Star of David). Food became increasingly scarce in the town. Daily curfews were enforced in the entire town but were stricter for Jews and Roma (also called Romani people and often called Gypsies). Within two months, all the anti-Jewish measures that had been implemented in Germany and annexed Austria were also imposed in Serbia; boycott warnings were posted on all "Jewish-owned" stores and businesses (all of which soon afterward were closed), Jews were forbidden from using public transport, and signs stating "Entrance Prohibited for Jews and Gypsies" were posted on businesses, stores, taverns, parks, and other public spaces. Men (and sometimes women too) were forced to engage in hard physical labor for the German army. Public humiliation and physical violence directed at Jews became common. Several prominent Jewish citizens of Šabac were shot and then hanged in the town's main square.

On 4 July, the German army issued an order which stated that all Jews in Šabac, including the Kladovo Group, must go to the former Yugoslavian military barracks (which would become a concentration camp) located near Šabac. This order was implemented on 20 July, when the German army forced the members of the Kladovo Group to load all their belongings onto German trucks for transport to the concentration camp. The German army then forced the 1,051 (or 1,107 according to another source) refugees to march the short distance to the concentration camp (located on the west shore of the Sava River); it consisted of pre-war military barracks which the Nazis transformed into a concentration camp that became known as the "Nazi camp Barracks on the Sava in Šabac" or, more simply, as the Šabac Concentration Camp.

On 22 August, the remaining ~63 to ~130 Jewish citizens (men, women, and children) of Šabac, as well as an unknown number of Roma residents who lived in and around Šabac, were forcibly moved by the Nazis to the Šabac Concentration Camp. The camp now contained ~1,200 prisoners. The prisoners lived under inhumane conditions that included food shortages, forced labor, poor hygiene, and disease. The concentration camp was surrounded by two barbed wire fences and there were several guard houses and guard towers in the camp. The refugees were housed in six barracks, each about 45 m long and 10 m wide; these buildings had dirt floors and broken windows that were covered by sheets of plywood. During their months in the concentration camp, the refugees were taken daily to do often exhausting forced labor (including cleaning, digging, carrying heavy loads, building, etc.) for the Germans stationed in Šabac.

== Guerrilla insurgencies and their consequences ==
Over a period of five days from 26 to 30 September, in response to attacks by Yugoslavian partisans and Chetniks, the male residents of Šabac (ages 14-70, totalling over 4,400) and the >800 male prisoners of the Šabac Concentration Camp were force-marched by the German army's 342nd Infantry Division to the village of Klenak (~5 km away). After two days and two nights spent in the open without food, the men were then force-marched at a fast pace for 23 km to the village of Jarak where the Nazis had planned to build another concentration camp. During the four-hour march, those who fell from exhaustion or lagged behind were shot; it is estimated that 80-120 men including 5 to ~20 (the numbers are not definite because different scholars provide different numbers) men of the Kladovo Group were shot during what came to be known as the "Bloody March" (or "Blood March"). When the Nazis realized that the site at Jarak was not suitable for a concentration camp, they abandoned their plan. On 30 September, they marched the men of the Šabac Concentration Camp and the men of Šabac back to the concentration camp (the line of over 5,000 men was ~3 kilometers long); the men of Šabac were then allowed to return home but the men of the Kladovo Group were forced to remain in the concentration camp.

== Shooting of the men of the Kladovo Group ==
At the beginning of October 1941, in reaction to the growing Serbian rebellion in September, the German Supreme Military Commander, Wilhelm Keitel, signed a command which specified that 100 communists were to be executed for each German soldier killed and 50 were to be executed for each German soldier wounded. In reprisal for an attack on a German military column on 2 October by Serbian partisans, General Franz Bohme (Chief Commander of the German Army in Serbia, who was personally appointed by Hitler) issued an order that 100 Jews and Roma would be executed for every German killed. The order specifically stated that "with the objective of retaliation for 21 German soldiers who were killed near Topola several days ago, 2100 Jews and Gypsies (will be) executed … 805 Jews and Gypsies will be taken from the camp at Šabac, while the rest from the Jewish temporary camp in Belgrade." The execution order was implemented by Major General [Dr.] Walter Hinghofer who commanded Germany's 342nd Infantry Division.

On 12 and 13 October 1941, all the men of the Kladovo Group and the Jewish men of Šabac as well as 70 (other sources state 100 to 160) Roma and several Serbs from Šabac, totaling over 800 men, were initially assembled at a nearby location that was close to a set of train tracks. The men were then taken by train to a farmer's field near the village of Zasavica (~40 km from the Šabac Concentration Camp). All the men were executed by a firing squad of Wehrmacht soldiers of the 342nd Infantry Division and their bodies were then thrown into a long ditch.

After World War II ended, a Serbian farmer who witnessed the mass shooting by the Nazis at this location testified on February 20, 1945 at the Serbian State Commission for the Investigation of War Crimes (District Office, Šabac, Protocol 849/45). The farmer's name was Milorad Mića Jelesić. The original record of his testimony is kept in the archive of the "Serbian State Commission for the Determination of Crimes of the Occupiers and their Accomplices" at Belgrade; it contains the original signature of the witness, Milorad Mića Jelesić. The German translation of his eyewitness testimony is kept at the Arolsen Archives (formerly called the International Tracing Service) in Bad Arolsen, Germany. Shown below is the English translation of this eyewitness testimony [with comments inserted within parentheses to provide clarification].

Protocol Number 849/45

Transcribed on 20 February 1945, at the District Office of the Serbian State Commission for the Investigation of War Crimes in Šabac. Based on a subpoena, Milorad Mica Jelesić, a farmer from the village Majur [located near Šabac], 40 years of age, appeared, was warned to tell the truth, and was made aware of the consequences of perjury. He gave the following testimony: In the month of October 1941, when the German reprisal troop passed through Macva [geographical region in which Šabac is located], I went with all the other farmers, according to the order of the German Occupation Forces, to receive our identity papers. But as a result, I was imprisoned in the barracks in the Šabac Camp. Just before Mioljdan [the Serbian Orthodox feast of Saint Michael], when the Germans asked who wants to be sent to work, I volunteered, just to get away from the camp for a while. We, a group of approximately 400 men, were transferred to Klenak [located across the Sava River from Šabac] and from there by train to Sremska Mitrovica. At Sremska Mitrovica they kept us for 3 days without food in the railway cars that we were brought in; during the day, we were sent out into a field. On the 4th day, small groups were taken to work. In the evening, when they returned, they were not allowed to get together with us. On Mioljdan, which is on October 12, I was in a group of approximately 40 men taken to Macvanska Mitrovica and from there to Zasavica [located ~40 km northwest of Šabac]. On the way we thought that the Germans would shoot us, and our fear became greater when we arrived at a ditch approximately 200 meters long, 2.5 meters wide and 2.5 meters deep. Later, I learned that the ditch was dug by members of the groups taken before us.

They pushed us back along the banks of the Sava River, about 250-300 meters away from the ditch, and we were forced to sit down. The ground we were sitting on was wet and full of puddles. We asked them not to torture us but shoot us immediately. A German who spoke Serbian told us that we were not going to be killed, but we were there only as workers. Then I saw that the Germans stuck in the ground, 3-4 meters from the ditch, 50-70 stakes each about 10 cm wide and about 50-60 cm high. Then we were moved closer, around 50-60 meters from the ditch. At the same time, a company of about 150 German soldiers arrived. The Germans were brought lunch and they all ate. Afterwards, from the direction of Mitrovica, a group of approximately 50 men in civilian clothing were brought through the cornfields, and I could tell that they were Jews. Each one of them had to approach one of the stakes, which were placed 1-2 meters apart, and stand with the stake between his legs, facing the ditch. Everyone had their faces turned toward the ditch.

When the preparations were completed, the company of Germans soldiers lined up in a way that two soldiers would shoot at each Jew. The soldiers were no more than 10 meters away from the Jews, and we were 50 meters behind the soldiers. Then four soldiers holding an open blanket passed along the row of Jews and they threw on the blanket different valuables and money. When this was finished, the officer in charge ordered to shoot. The Germans shot at the Jews, each time two soldiers shot at the back of the neck of each Jew.

Then we were ordered to run and throw the bodies into the ditch. But first, we were ordered to search their pockets and remove all valuables such as watches or money, and also to remove the rings from their fingers. Since many of the rings could not be easily removed, the Germans gave us pliers that we used to remove the rings and everything was handed to them. Before we threw the bodies into the ditch, I saw the Germans pulling gold teeth out of the mouths of the murdered bodies. In case they could not pull out a gold tooth, they kicked his mouth with their boots until the tooth fell out.

When we had finished with the first group, we moved back behind the shooters and a second group was brought, which until then had been kept behind the cornfield. They were handled and killed by the same method as the previous group. How many groups were shot on this day I don't know, but most of the time each stake always had one person. In the evening we were taken back to Sremska Mitrovica and all 40 of us were locked up in one railway car. The following day, the whole group of 40 people was taken to the same place at Zasavica and the shootings continued just like on the previous day. On the first day, only Jews were shot, but on the following day more of our Gypsies than Jews were shot. All the time, there were Germans that were busy photographing different stages such as: the victims before their execution when they stood at the stakes, the bodies lying beside the stakes, us throwing the bodies into the ditch, the soldiers shooting, and other scenes.

From the number of groups that were shot and the ditch of about 200 meters full to the top with bodies, except at one end of the ditch in an area of 5 meters that was filled with backpacks and other different items to a height of 1.5 meters, I think that in those two days at least 1,200 citizens were shot dead. When we left on the first evening, the ditch was not covered. When we arrived the next morning, we found several dogs were chewing on the flesh of some of the bodies and some body parts had been dragged away. One German shot a dog and said, while pointing at the corpses, "and these are dogs too" – and while pointing at the dead dog, he added "and this is their brother".

Belgrade, 12 June 1946

Other witnesses from the village of Štitar (near Šabac), including Janko Arsenović, Svetislav Resa Arsenović, Mihailo Ćosić, Miodrag P. Ćosić, and Dragoljub Terzić, confirmed Jelesić's statement and provided some additional details.

In that farmer's field more than 800 Jews and Roma and several Serbs were killed on 12 and 13 October 1941. Most of the soldiers of the 342nd Infantry Division who carried out the mass shooting of the (mostly) Austrian refugees were themselves Austrians. Also notable that the massacre at Zasavica is not mentioned in any surviving German documents. It is only because of the survival of Serbian prisoners who witnessed the execution that we know any details about the tragic fate of these innocent Jews, Roma and Serbs.

== Women and children in the Sajmište Concentration Camp ==
On 26 January 1942, the remaining ~265 women and children of the Kladovo Group and the ~35 Jewish women and children from Šabac imprisoned in the Šabac Concentration Camp were forced to move from the camp to a concentration camp at Zemun, a municipality located across the Sava River from downtown Belgrade (but today Zemun is a part of greater Belgrade). This concentration camp was established in December 1941 and was initially called Judenlager Semlin ("Judenlager" is a German word meaning "camp for Jews" and this name shows that this concentration camp was established specifically for the imprisonment of Jews; the word Semlin is an alternative German name for Zemun). (Note: Several months later, after all the Jewish prisoners in the Judenlager Semlin Concentration Camp had been murdered, the name of the camp was changed to Sajmište concentration camp, also called the Zemun Concentration Camp. This camp was originally built at the end of the 1930s as a fairground (Sajmište literally means "fairground") to host European trade shows. In late 1941, the German army converted it into a concentration camp that was initially used to imprison Belgrade's Jews; it was one of the first Nazi concentration camps established specifically for the mass imprisonment of Jews.) The name of this camp was subsequently changed to Sajmiste Concentration Camp.

To move them from the Šabac Concentration Camp, the Kladovo-Šabac women and children were first transported in train cattle cars from Šabac to Ruma and then forced to march ~60 km to Judenlager Semlin in bitter cold weather and deep snow. Some of the old and sick women as well as some children died during this forced march due to exhaustion and exposure to the bitterly cold winter weather. In January 1942, when the Kladovo-Šabac women and children arrived at the concentration camp at Zemun (which was the largest concentration camp on Serbian territory), it already had over 5300 Jewish women and children (and some elderly men) from Belgrade and the Banat region of northern Serbia.

The large pavilions originally built for trade shows were not built to serve as residential quarters, so the living conditions were horrendous. The pavilions were converted into prisoners' barracks; floors were created by erecting wooden scaffolding through which the prisoners had to crawl. Wehrmacht soldiers and SS guards prowled the camp with batons and large dogs. There was minimal food provided to the prisoners; survivors recollected the never-ending hunger. There was minimal heating, straw for bedding, only a few toilets, and only one shower room for the entire concentration camp. Due to the psychological stress, some prisoners committed suicide by jumping from upper floors. During the harsh winter of 1941-1942, also one of the coldest on record, approximately 500 prisoners (mostly children and the elderly) in this camp died of starvation, disease or froze to death due to the bitterly cold winter weather. The camp hospital became overcrowded, resulting in many patients being transferred to Belgrade hospitals. After the war, a Belgrade hospital staff member testified:

In the winter of 1941-42 we received a number of new patients: women from Sajmište. With them came children with frostbite. Their nails fell off from hunger and cold. They looked like living skeletons, just skin and bones. From old men's faces, children's eyes stared at us. They had nothing in common with children anymore. The women refused to talk about what was going on in Sajmište.

The food they were given came from the remains that were left over from the Belgrade population; it supplied, on average, about 80 grams of food per day per person. For each of the 300 infants, there was 200 grams of milk per day. Every night, between 10 and 25 people died of hunger and cold. The bodies of the deceased had to be disposed of by the camp's prisoners, and were taken by Belgrade municipality vehicles to a Jewish cemetery.

In January 1942, shortly before the forced transfer of the women and children of Kladovo-Šabac, SS Untersturmführer (Second Lieutenant) Herbert Andorfer was appointed to be the commander of the Sajmište Concentration Camp. The previous commander, SS Oberscharführer (Staff Sergeant) Edgar Enge, became the deputy commander. Internally, however, the camp was operated by a Jewish camp self-government. According to Andorfer's statements, a good relationship developed between him and the Jewish camp self-government. He drank coffee with them and told them they would soon be transported to a camp in Romania or Poland that had better living conditions.

The Sajmište Concentration Camp was initially regarded by the Germans only as a temporary camp until the planned deportation of Jews to the East. However, at the Wannsee Conference at the end of January 1942, it was decided that all Jews would be murdered; so it became clear that the deportation of Serbian Jews to the East was no longer a priority and they would have a slightly longer stay in Serbia itself. This decision became problematic for the German occupiers for several reasons, not least because the Wehrmacht required concentration camps for the internment of the growing number of captives taken in battles with the Yugoslavian partisans.

== Murder in a gas chamber truck ("gas van") ==
From 19 March to 10 May 1942, from Monday to Saturday every day in the morning, the surviving women and children were murdered in a gas chamber truck (often referred to as a "gas van"). The dark grey van, resembling a moving truck without any windows in the rear compartment, would be driven from the Sajmište Concentration Camp across the Old Sava Bridge (Serbian: Stari savski most) and then through the streets of Belgrade to a village called Jajinci which at that time was located immediately south of Belgrade but today is part of greater Belgrade. The van, which in Nazi documents was referred to by the euphemism "delousing truck" (Entlausungswagen), was in fact a mobile gas chamber. The van was modified in a way that allowed its engine exhaust fumes to be diverted into the airtight cargo compartment at the back of the truck.

How were the camp prisoners convinced to get into the van? The prisoners were deceived by the camp commander Herbert Andorfer by being told that they were to be transported to a camp in Romania or Poland that had better living conditions. To calm the children, the two SS drivers of the gas chamber truck distributed candies to the children, while 50-80 (and sometimes as many as 100) people at a time would climb into the back of the van (with their baggage placed in another truck). The double doors at the back of the van were then sealed shut and the truck was then driven across the bridge over the Sava River into Belgrade. During the drive through the city's streets, the driver would always stop at a specific location on Branka Krsmanovića Street. At that location, one of the two Nazi soldiers would get out and turn a lever to divert the exhaust gases from the van's tailpipe into the van's airtight rear compartment; then the van would continue on its journey to Jajinci. Once the exhaust gases were diverted into the cargo compartment, a 10 to 20 minute drive was enough to kill the people locked in the back by carbon monoxide poisoning. This mobile method of killing Jews was in fact an ominous prelude to the mass killing of Jews by poison gas (hydrogen cyanide released from Zyklon B canisters) in permanent industrial-scale gas chambers to be built not long afterward at Nazi death camps elsewhere in Europe.

It is worthy to note that starting on March 19, 1942, this gas chamber truck was also used over several days to kill approximately 500 patients, staff, and Jews from (the Serbian region of) Banat lodged at the Belgrade Jewish Hospital as well as at the synagogue and at Belgrade's "Oneg Shabbat Jewish Culture Society" building. After all the Jews at Sajmište were murdered, this gas chamber truck was then used to murder Jewish prisoners of the nearby Banjica Concentration Camp. Subsequently, this mobile gas chamber was transferred to the Maly Trostinets (Belarus) and Chelmno (Poland) death camps where it was used to murder many more thousands of Jews.

The gas chamber truck (manufactured by the German company Saurer) was driven every day (except on Sundays) by two junior SS officers named Wilhelm Götz and Ervin Meyer accompanied by the Herbert Andorfer and his deputy Edgar Enge driving in a car immediately ahead of the van; during those 53 days, they made between 50 and 100 trips between Sajmište and Jajinci. It is estimated that these gassings killed as many as 8,000 prisoners, mostly women and children.

The final destination of the gas chamber truck was Jajinci. Upon arriving, the bodies of the murdered victims were unloaded by Serbian prisoners who buried the dead in at least 80 trenches (mass graves) that had been prepared in advance. (It is worth noting that after the murders were concluded, Andorfer was decorated with the Iron Cross medal and received a promotion.) This site at Jajinci was also used by the Nazis for mass shootings of Yugoslavian political prisoners and captured partisans. It is estimated that approximately 80,000 people were buried in Jajinci's mass graves.

At his trial in 1968, Andorfer's deputy, Edgar Enge, stated:

After opening the door, it was observed that the bodies were generally more in the rear part of the van's interior. The bodies were then transported by prisoners to the pits and subsequently covered with earth. [...] In any case, I noticed signs of life in the gassed victims. Their faces had a pale appearance. The gas vans were not materially damaged. Essentially, you could notice only vomit in the van. At the funeral no doctor was present. It has also not been determined in detail whether the gassed Jews were really dead.

In May 1942, there were still a few survivors of the Kladovo-Šabac group, together with a group of German Jews from Banat, in the Sajmište Concentration Camp. They were assigned to clean the camp. When they were done, most of them were shot. Only a handful survived, mainly the Jewish men who were married to non-Jewish women; they were released on the promise of confidentiality. Of the last Jewish refugees in the Kladovo-Šabac group, only Dorothea Fink and Borika Betting Dorfer survived.

What happened to the bodies of all the people buried at Jajinci? As also happened at many other Nazi death camps, in anticipation of Germany's defeat in World War II, the Nazis decided to conceal the evidence of the mass murder at Jajinci by burning the remains of the bodies. From November/December 1943 to March/April 1944, they implemented the Nazi project called Sonderaktion 1005 (Special Action 1005) by forcing Serbian prisoners and the surviving Jews from the Dalmatian coast of Croatia to dig up the remains of the tens of thousands of bodies and burn them on giant cremation pyres. After being incinerated, the ashes were transported by truck to the bank of the Sava River next to the Cukarića district of Belgrade and unloaded there to be swept away by the river (but it is possible that at least some of the ashes were scattered or buried in Jajinci). Once their work was completed, the prisoners and Croatian Jews were shot.

== Events after World War II ended ==
On June 12-13, 1945, after WWII ended, the mass grave at Zasavica was opened by the "State Commission for the Investigation of Crimes Committed by the Occupiers and their Collaborators in Yugoslavia"; the bodies of 834 (or, according to another source, 868) people were exhumed. The bodies included 725 Jewish refugees (including two Jewish women) from the Kladovo-Šabac Group and 23 Jews from Šabac (note that another source states a total of ~800 Jewish refugees and Jews from Šabac) as well as 84 (or according to another source, ~70) Roma and several Serbs from Šabac. The identities of some of them were established from personal documents found on them, while some from Šabac were identified by their families. Because the original site of the mass grave at Zasavica was prone to flooding from the nearby Sava River, the bodies of the victims were reburied in a mass grave at Šabac.

In 1959, the skeletal remains of the men in the mass grave at Šabac were exhumed for a second time and then reburied in the Sephardi Jewish Cemetery in Belgrade. At that site in the cemetery, a very large gravestone was installed in 1964 by the Austrian Jewish Community and the Federation of Jewish Communities of Yugoslavia. It has an inscription in three languages (Hebrew, Serbian and German) which states the following:

In this place are buried 800 martyrs from Austria, who were brutally murdered in the city of Šabac, on the 4th of Cheshvan 5702, by the Nazi murderers, may their names be erased, on their journey to our holy land. This monument was erected in their memory by the Jewish community of Vienna. Remember, don't forget.

== In memoriam ==
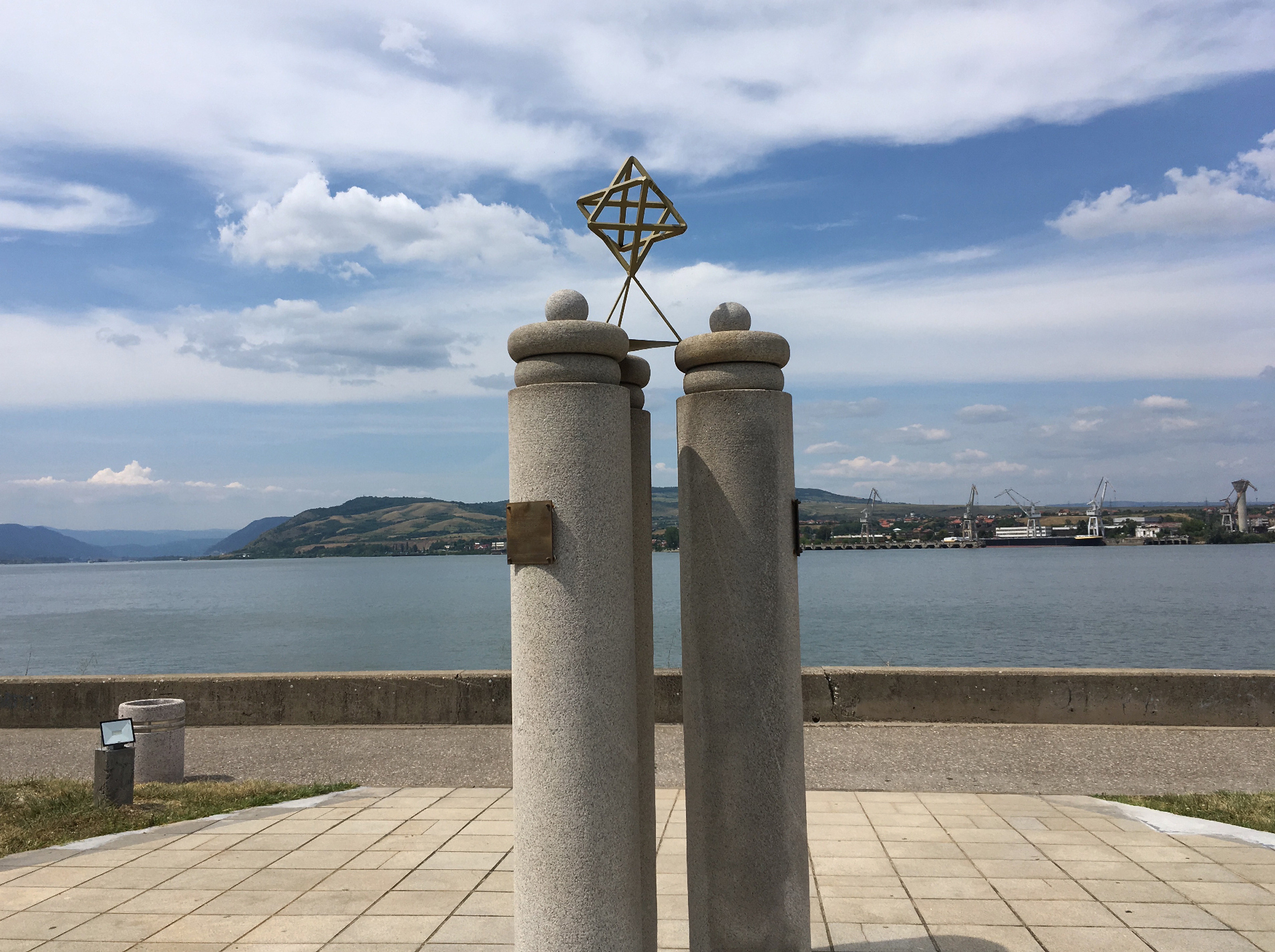
Kladovo transport monument, Kladovo

In the centre of the town of Kladovo, there is a memorial monument erected in memory of the Kladovo Group of Jewish refugees. The monument, designed by Mimi Bihaly-Vučković, was erected and dedicated in 2002 and stands on the riverbank promenade in Kladovo. Referring to the three riverboats, it consists of three pillars resembling Torah scrolls with a three-dimensional Star of David at the top. Attached to the monument is a brass plaque with a Hebrew inscription which states:

In January to September 1940, this place was used as a safe harbour for about a thousand Austrian and Central European Jews, who were murdered by the Nazis, in the middle of their journey to Israel. Kladovo, October 2002.

At the former site of the Šabac Concentration Camp located next to the Sava River near Šabac, on the remains of an old fortress (originally built by the Ottoman Empire), there is a small square white plaque located high up on the upper left side of the fortress wall. The Serbian inscription on the plaque states the following:

At this location, during the occupation, there was a German camp renowned for its evil in which there were several thousands of citizens of the Podrinje region (a region beside the Drina River) and other locations of our fatherland. From it, over a thousand Jews and several hundred of our citizens were shot.

— 3-X-1954 Citizens of Šabac

Close to the farmer's field (near the village of Zasavica) where all the Kladovo Group men were shot by a firing squad of Wehrmacht soldiers, there is a roadside memorial monument installed in 2004. The inscription on the monument states the following (in three languages: Serbian, Hebrew, and German):

Near this location, in October 1941, 800 Austrian Jews were shot, and their posthumous remains were transferred to the Jewish Cemetery in Belgrade.

— Jewish Community of Yugoslavia
Jewish Religious Community of Vienna

In Belgrade, at the former site of the Sajmište Concentration Camp, there is a plaque which was installed in 1984. The Serbian inscription on the plaque states:

Upon the area of the Old Fairgrounds, the German Gestapo founded the Sajmište Camp in 1941. With the help of domestic traitors, over 40,000 people from all parts of our country were brutally tortured and murdered.

It is notable that when reading this inscription, no one would know that among the prisoners, over 6,000 and perhaps as many as 8,000 Serbian Jews, as well as the Jewish refugees captured in Serbia, were brutally imprisoned here and eventually murdered only because they were Jewish. Over the past few decades, a series of successive Serbian governments have acknowledged this problem and announced plans to preserve the remaining buildings and establish a major Holocaust memorial on this site. But to date, despite many years of discussion, nothing has actually been done. However, in February 2020, the Serbian parliament voted to establish a memorial centre on this site to ensure a "lasting memory of the victims of the Holocaust". Thus far, this decision by the Serbian parliament has not been implemented.

Not far from the plaque described above, a bronze monument by sculptor Miodrag Popović was unveiled for the victims of the Sajmište Concentration Camp on 22 April 1995 (the "day of remembrance of the victims of the genocide"). This 10-meter-high abstract monument is located on the banks of the Sava River, just outside the boundary of the adjacent camp so that it can be seen from the nearby bridge and from the old city fortress located on the other side of the river. This monument has a long inscription which states, in part, that this memorial was built "in commemoration of the victims of genocide and the 50th anniversary of victory over fascism". It is dedicated to all the "Serbs, Jews and Roma" who were imprisoned here and were ultimately murdered.

In Belgrade, there is a plaque and monument at the location on Branka Krsmanovica Street where the Nazi drivers stopped the gas chamber truck to divert its engine exhaust gases into the rear compartment. The inscription on the plaque (in Serbian and English) states the following:

It is from this spot that the agony of Jewish women and children started. They were the prisoners of Jewish concentration camp in Zemun, established on the former Belgrade fairgrounds, at that time the territory of the independent state of Croatia. From the end of March until May 10th 1942, around 6,300 people were murdered on the death path of the gas chamber-truck which led from the left bank of the Sava to the scaffolds of Jajinci. Serbia thus became one of the first territories occupied by the Germans in Europe, where the Nazi plan of total annihilation of the Jews (Holocaust) was carried out.

In Belgrade, the Jajinci Memorial Park has a memorial monument which consists of a tall pillar and, at its top, there is a stainless-steel abstract representation of a white dove. Nearby is a sign which states the following: "More than 80,000 Serbs, Jews, Roma and other anti-fascists were executed in this area during World War Two (1941-1944)"; in 1943/44, their bodies were exhumed from the mass graves and burned on large cremation pyres by the Nazis.

In Belgrade's Sephardi Jewish Cemetery, there is a large Holocaust Memorial monument. In addition, there is a very large gravestone in this cemetery, marking the site where the skeletal remains of the over 800 murdered men that were originally buried in the farmer's field near Zasavica were reburied in a mass grave in 1959. This massive gravestone was erected in 1964 by the Austrian Jewish Community and the Federation of Jewish Communities of Yugoslavia. The inscription, in three languages (Hebrew, Serbian and German), states the following:

In this place are buried 800 martyrs from Austria, who were brutally murdered in the city of Šabac, on the 4th of Cheshvan 570271, by the Nazi murderers, may their names be erased, on their journey to our holy land. This monument was erected in their memory by the Jewish community of Vienna. Remember, don't forget.

Note that the date "4th of Cheshvan 5702" is unfortunately incorrect. As described previously, the date on which they were murdered was 12–13 October 1941, which on the Jewish calendar was 21–22 Tishrei 5702.

In Jerusalem, Yad Vashem, the World Holocaust Remembrance Center was built by the Israeli government to (a) commemorate the six million Jews murdered by the German Nazis and their collaborators, (b) commemorate the destroyed Jewish communities, the ghetto and resistance fighters, and (c) honor the Righteous Among the Nations who risked their lives to rescue Jews during the Holocaust. At this large museum, there is a memorial plaque to the victims of the Kladovo Group.

From 8 July to 4 November 2001, the Jewish Museum, Vienna held an exhibition titled "Kladovo – An Escape to Palestine" curated by Alisa Douer and Reinhard Geir. The basis of the exhibition were photographs that were taken by members of the Kladovo Group during their flight. One of the few survivors was Ehud Nahir who compiled the photographs in an album. In addition, a documentary film by Alisa Douer was produced with the support of the National Fund of the Republic of Austria for Victims of National Socialism. The exhibition was complemented by a bilingual (German and English) companion book.

== Legal prosecution ==
Herbert Andorfer, the commander of the Sajmište Concentration Camp, initially escaped justice after the war ended, but was eventually arrested in Austria and prosecuted in West Germany in 1969. He was convicted for aiding and abetting the murder of "at least 5,500" Jewish prisoners; he was sentenced to only 30 months in prison but was released immediately because he had already spent that amount of time in detention prior to his conviction. Herbert Andorfer died in 2003 at an Austrian old people's home at age 92.

Andorfer's deputy, Edgar Enge, was put on trial in West Germany in 1968 and found guilty of aiding and abetting murder; he was sentenced to only 18 months imprisonment but due to his "old age and poor health", he was released on probation.

There is no record of the fate of the two junior SS officers named Wilhelm Götz and Ervin Meyer who drove the gas chamber truck and killed as many as 8,000 prisoners, mostly women and children. However, Edgar Enge stated that Götz and Meyer were afterward shot by the Gestapo and buried with their victims.

General Franz Bohme, who issued the order to execute over 800 men by a firing squad in the farmer's field near Zasavica on 12 and 13 October 1941, was one of the Nazi generals accused in Nuremberg Trial #7 (out of 12 trials) for war crimes regarding the murder of civilian hostages. After the war, he was captured in Norway. He committed suicide in prison in 1947 before he could be arraigned for trial.

Major General Walter Hinghofer, the commander of the firing squad, died in Vienna in 1951; there is no record of him having ever been put on trial for the murder of the Jewish refugees and Roma civilians.

== Sources ==
- Gabriele Anderl, Walter Manoschek: Gescheiterte Flucht. Der jüdische "Kladovo-Transport" auf dem Weg nach Palästina 1939–42. Verlag für Gesellschaftskritik, Wien 1993, ISBN 3-85115-179-8.
- Željko Dragić: Die Reise in die Ewigkeit. 70 Jahre Kladovo Transport. Putovanje u večnost. 70 godina Kladovo transporta. Twist Zeitschriften Verlag GmbH, Wien 2013, ISBN 978-3-200-02824-1 (in German, Serbian, and English).
- Alisa Douer im Auftrag des Jüdischen Museums Wien (Hrsg.): Kladovo – Eine Flucht nach Palästina/Escape to Palestine. Mandelbaum Verlag, Wien 2001, ISBN 3-85476-044-2 (Begleitpublikation in deutsch und englisch zur Ausstellung Kladovo – Eine Flucht nach Palästina, Jüdisches Museum Wien, 8 July to 4 November 2001).
- Erika Weinzierl, Otto D. Kulka (Hrsg.): Vertreibung und Neubeginn. Israelische Bürger österreichischer Herkunft. Böhlau-Verlag, Wien/Köln/Weimar 1992, ISBN 3-205-05561-6.
- Walter Manoschek: "Serbien ist judenfrei". Militärische Besatzungspolitik und Judenvernichtung in Serbien 1941/42. 2. Auflage. Oldenbourg Verlag, München 1993, ISBN 3-486-56137-5
- Avriel, Ehud (1975). Open the Gates! A Personal Story of "Illegal" Immigration to Israel. New York: Atheneum. ISBN 0-689-10590-8.
- Ofer, Dalia and Hannah Weiner. Dead-End Journey: The Tragic Story of the Kladovo-Šabac Group. Lanham: University Press of America, 1996, ISBN 0-7618-0199-5 (English translation from Hebrew by Anna Barber).
- Paul, Izak. Journey of Discovery: How I discovered what happened to my paternal grandparents and great-grandparents during the Holocaust. 2022, ISBN 978-1-7780378-0-1 ; ISBN 978-1-7780378-1-8
