= Šabac concentration camp =

Concentration camp in German-occupied Serbia

- Concentration camp
- Location within Serbia
- Coordinates: 44°45′N 19°42′E
- Other names: Šabac-Senjak Konzentrationslager
- Known for: Mass detention and killings of civilians, Jews and Roma
- Location: Šabac, German-occupied Serbia
- Built by: 342nd Infantry Division
- Operated by: Wehrmacht and German Order Police
- Operational: 30 September 1941 – 31 March 1942
- Inmates: Serbian civilians, Jews, Roma.
- Number of inmates: 22,000–30,000 (Note: Estimates vary. Pisarri gives about 22,000, Israeli more than 22,000, Kramer 26,000–30,000 and Mojzes 30,000.)
- Killed: Unknown

Šabac concentration camp (German: Anhaltelager Šabac) was a Wehrmacht-run concentration camp in German-occupied Serbia during World War II. The 342nd Infantry Division set it up on 30 September 1941 to hold Serbian civilians, Jews and Roma rounded up in operations against the insurgency. An estimated 22,000 to 30,000 people were imprisoned there in total, with between 15,000 and 20,000 held at once by mid-October.

Mass killings took place during the camp's operation. Many prisoners were shot or died of exhaustion on the "bloody march" to Jarak in late September 1941. In reprisal for the killing of 21 German soldiers near Topola, more than 800 Jews and Roma, among them at least 725 Jewish refugee men from the Kladovo transport, were shot near Zasavica on 12 and 13 October, where the Germans had planned a larger camp. The Jewish women and children were later taken to Sajmište and murdered in a gas van. About 1,000 inmates were shot by an Order Police company over the course of the camp's operation.

The camp closed on 31 March 1942, and the surviving prisoners were sent to other camps, including Banjica and Sajmište.

== History ==
=== Background ===
Before the Second World War, only about 70 Jews lived in Šabac in the Mačva region of western Serbia. (Note: Of approximately 11,150 Jews in wartime Serbia, some 7,700 lived in Belgrade; a further 2,100 had been deported from the Banat.) In 1940, the Yugoslav government confined around 1,300 Jewish refugees of the Kladovo transport in the town, after Romania refused to let their boats continue towards the Black Sea. Some lived in private houses and the rest in a warehouse provided by the municipality. Following the invasion of Yugoslavia in April 1941, Serbia came under German occupation. In July the German security police in Belgrade ordered the detention of all local Jews and refugees.

On 20 July 1941, the 1,107 Jewish refugees were imprisoned in a former artillery depot of the Yugoslav army near the old fortress, on the left bank of the Sava. Enclosed by barbed wire and guarded by Volksdeutsche units, the prisoners were held in six barracks. The site became known as the "Sava camp".

=== Jarak camp and the "bloody march" ===
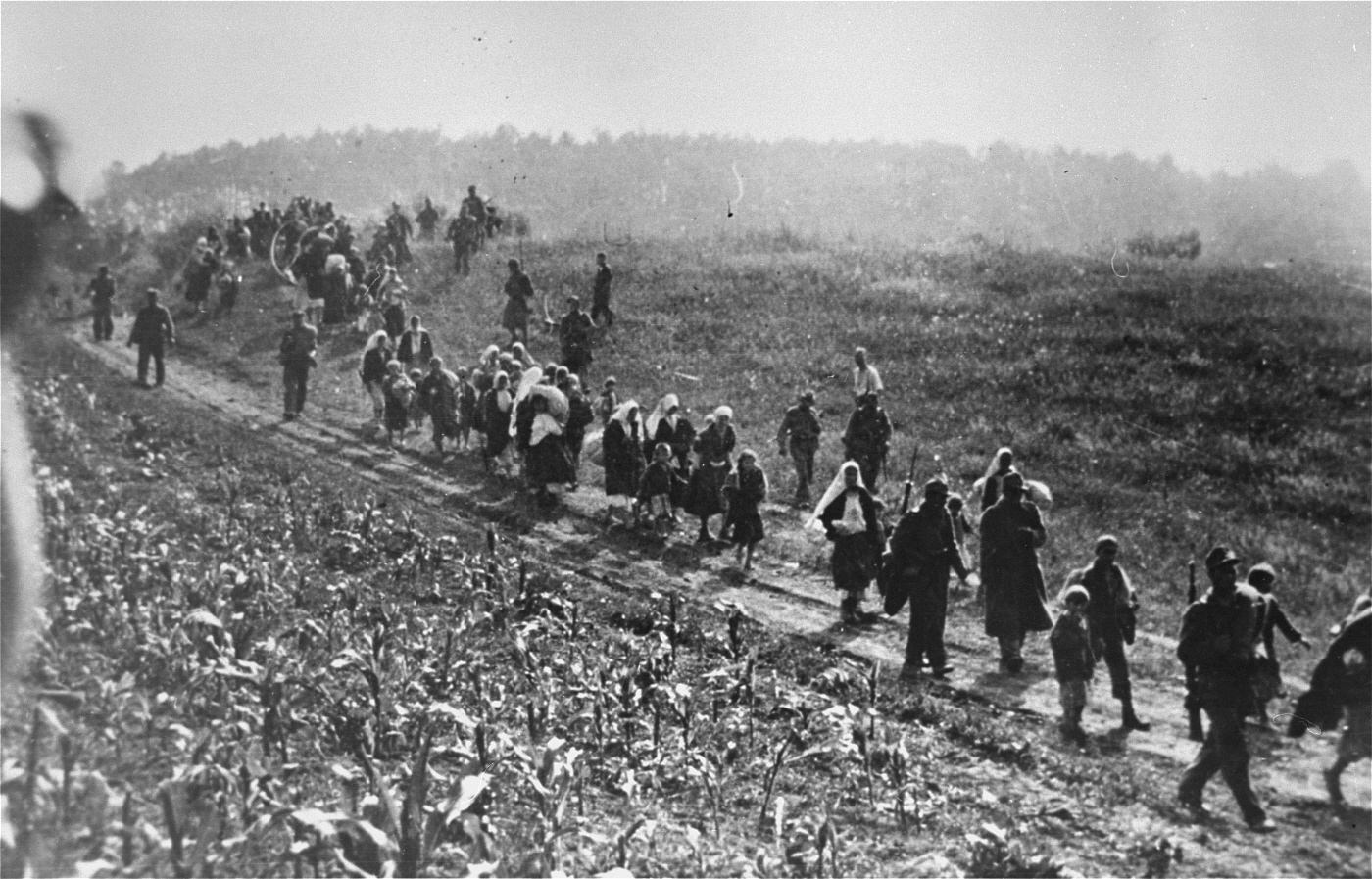
German and Ustaše forces lead a column of civilians to the Šabac camp during anti-Partisan operations in the Mačva region, 21–26 September 1941.

In September 1941, fighting intensified around the Mačva region, a major centre of Partisan and Chetnik resistance; on 23 September shots were fired at German patrols in Šabac. The German command ordered a mass roundup of Šabac's male population, arresting more than 4,000 men and razing 40 houses. The German Military Commander for Serbia ordered the 342nd Infantry Division "to collect, by foray, all men in Šabac between the ages of 14 and 70 and transfer them to the concentration camp, which the division will erect west of the river Sava."

On 26 September, about 5,000 local Serbs and about 1,100 Jews were force marched to a newly established camp at Jarak, a village near Sremska Mitrovica in the Independent State of Croatia (now in Serbia). The journey became known in Yugoslav literature as the "bloody march". Before it began, soldiers of the 342nd Division executed 82 people for "disobedience". Escorted by German and Croatian personnel, the prisoners were held at Klenak without food and water, then were ordered to run 23 kilometres (14 mi) to Jarak. Those unable to keep pace were shot along the way. After the camp at Jarak was judged unsuitable, the prisoners were marched back to Šabac, where a new provisional camp was being set up in army barracks at Senjak. Between 21 and 30 September, the 342nd Division executed 830 people, most of them unarmed civilians.

=== Establishment ===
The 342nd Division established the Šabac camp on 30 September 1941. It later came under the Plenipotentiary Commanding General in Serbia (Bevollmächtigter kommandierender General in Serbien), whose military administration was headed by Harald Turner. Housed in barracks in the town, the camp was guarded by the 1st Company of the 64th Reserve Police Battalion and the 4th and 6th Companies of the 750th Infantry Regiment, part of the 718th Infantry Division. The camp was run by the Wehrmacht and was not part of the SS concentration camp system. It was first under the 342nd Division, commanded by Generalleutnant Walter Hinghofer and, from 19 November 1941, Generalmajor Paul Hoffmann.

=== Detention and reprisals ===
German military operations in the Sava–Drina area in late September and early October led to more than 21,000 arrests. The prisoners brought to the camp, included male civilians from Šabac, Sremska Mitrovica and surrounding areas, local Jews and several hundred Roma. A Sicherheitsdienst ('SS Security Service' or SD) unit screened them for links to the insurgency. During the first two weeks, 910 prisoners were executed. On 2 October, 21 soldiers of a Wehrmacht signals unit were ambushed and killed near Topola, and that night, around 100 Partisans attacked the camp but were repulsed. On 4 October, in retaliation, Franz Böhme, the Military Commander for Serbia, ordered the execution of 2,100 hostages, later increased to 2,200, to be selected from the concentration camps at Šabac and Belgrade. Of these, 805 were taken from Šabac and the rest from Topovske Šupe.

In reprisal for the 21 German soldiers killed a few days ago near Topola, 2,100 Jews and Gypsies are to be shot. The execution will be carried out by the German army. 805 Jews and Gypsies will be taken from the Šabac camp, and the remainder from the transit camp in Belgrade.

— Order sent by the Gestapo on 9 October 1941, to the Ortskommandantur ('Local Army Command') in Šabac,

On 10 October, Böhme issued a general order setting a ratio of 100 hostages to be executed for every German soldier killed and 50 for every soldier wounded. According to a report by an officer of the 521st Intelligence Regiment, 180 people were shot on 9 October and a further 269 on 11 October, after which the executions were assigned to another Wehrmacht unit. By mid-October, the camp held between 15,000 and 20,000 people, as the 342nd Division sent about 1,000 more civilians each day. Böhme requested permission to deport the detained civilians to Germany as prisoners of war, but the request was refused. By 20 October, the SD had released 5,000 out of more than 22,000 people incarcerated.

=== Zasavica site and executions ===
On 6 October 1941, a site near the village of Zasavica, in the northern part of the Sava–Drina bend, was selected for a larger concentration camp to serve Serbia. The camp was intended to receive the prisoners held at Šabac within two weeks. Construction was assigned to the Organisation Todt, with an initial capacity of 30,000 prisoners planned for 20 October. An SD report envisaged expanding the camp to hold as many as 500,000 people, modelled on the German concentration-camp system. On 8 October, 400 Serbian builders and craftsmen were transferred from Šabac to work on its construction. On 11 October 1941, the Jewish men of the Kladovo-Šabac group were moved from the Sava camp to the Šabac camp and then to Zasavica, where they were held alongside a group of Roma.

According to historian Bojan Aleksov, "at least 725 refugee men and two women from the camp, along with 23 local Jewish men, 84 Roma and several Serbs", were executed there on 12 and 13 October. The executions were carried out by soldiers of the 750th Regiment, and the victims were buried in mass graves on the banks of the Sava. Heavy rain turned the clay soil into a quagmire that prevented vehicles from reaching the camp, and the Zasavica site was soon deemed unsuitable. On 29 October, Böhme's quartermaster department halted construction and ordered the surviving prisoners to return to Šabac. In January 1942, the Jewish women and children were taken by train to Ruma and then marched to the Sajmište concentration camp in Zemun, and murdered there in a gas van. A post-war commission that exhumed the Zasavica graves found 868 victims. Only two women out of the 1,200 Jews detained at Šabac survived.

=== Closure ===
Further mass shootings of camp inmates took place in November 1941. About 1,000 inmates were shot by the 1st Company of the 64th Reserve Police Battalion during the camp's operation, over the same period units of the 342nd killed more than 2,200 civilians in wider "cleansing operations" in the area. The camp closed on 31 March 1942, the remaining prisoners were transferred to other facilities, including Banjica in German-occupied Serbia and Sajmište in the Independent State of Croatia. The separate Sava camp remained in use until September 1944.
