= Herbert Andorfer =

Austrian SS officer and war criminal (1911–2003)

- Swiss internment identification pass issued to Andorfer under a false name.
- Born: 3 March 1911; Linz, Austria
- Died: 17 October 2003 (aged 92); Salzburg
- Status: Deceased
- Conviction: Accessory to murder
- Penalty: 2.5 years' imprisonment (1969)
- SS service
- Allegiance: Nazi Germany
- Branch: Schutzstaffel
- Rank: Untersturmführer
- Commands: Sajmište concentration camp (1942–43)

Herbert Andorfer (3 March 1911 – 17 October 2003) was an Austrian SS officer and war criminal, convicted of accessory to murder. He joined the Nazi Party in 1931 and the SS in 1933, and following Germany's invasion of Yugoslavia served with the security police in Belgrade, including at Šabac concentration camp. In early 1942 he was appointed commandant of Sajmište concentration camp, where he personally oversaw the systematic murder of approximately 7,500 Jewish women and children. He later commanded an anti-partisan unit in northern Italy, where he directed reprisal operations in the Monte Grappa region in September 1944 that killed both partisans and civilians, including the public hanging of 31 young men in Bassano del Grappa after they had surrendered under a promise of safe passage.

Andorfer evaded justice for over two decades, fleeing to Venezuela under a false identity, before being extradited and sentenced to two and a half years' imprisonment by a West German court in 1969.

== Early life and career ==
Herbert Andorfer was born on 3 March 1911, in Linz, Austria. He grew up with his mother in Salzburg, where he graduated from secondary school in 1929 and began training as a hotel manager. During his school years, he became a member of a German nationalist student fraternity. He joined the NSDAP in 1931 and the SS in 1933 at a time when both organisations were still banned. Following the annexation of Austria into Germany, Andorfer became a full-time NSDAP local group leader, then a full-time Rottenführer within the SS. He served in the domestic intelligence section (Abteilung III) in Innsbruck and Salzburg, before joining the SS leadership staff of Einsatzgruppe Agram in Zagreb following the invasion of Yugoslavia.

Following the reorganisation of Einsatzgruppe into a Sicherheitspolizei office around the turn of 1941/42, Andorfer was transferred to Belgrade, German occupied-Serbia. Assigned to the BdS (Commander of the Security Police and SD) in Belgrade on 29 October 1941, his initial duty involved screening prisoners at Šabac concentration camp, where approximately 12,000 detainees, almost exclusively partisans and Chetniks, held after the autumn 1941 uprising were being processed. The camp evacuation began in early December 1941 and concluded mid-January 1942 with the execution of approximately 500 prisoners.

== Commandant of Sajmište: orchestrating mass murder ==
In late January or early February 1942, Section III chief Hans Rexeisen appointed him commandant of the newly established Sajmište concentration camp, where he remained under Section III authority rather than the Gestapo section that normally handled Jewish affairs. The camp was located on Croatian territory but supplied from German-occupied Serbia. In early March 1942, Andorfer was informed that a gas van from Berlin would arrive in order to "put to sleep" (eingeschläfert) the camp's inmates. Andorfer personally oversaw the gassing operations, accompanying each prisoner convoy in his service vehicle to the Avala execution site southeast of Belgrade; upon arrival at the site, the bodies were unloaded into mass graves prepared by prisoner work squads. Between March and May 1942, approximately 7,500 Jewish women and children were killed through this operation. Andorfer directly commanded the burial operations and remained present throughout the process.

A few months ago I ordered the shooting of all the Jewish males under my command, and the assembling of all the Jewish women and children in the camp. At that time I obtained, with the help of the SD, a delousing van [Entlausungwagon] which shall clean up the camp in a few weeks time.

— Herbert Andorfer to Himmler's adjutant, Karl Wolff,

== Italy, escape and hiding ==
Following the completion of the gassing operations, Andorfer was transferred first to Albania and then to the SD office in Salzburg. From 1943, Andorfer commanded an anti-partisan Wehrmacht unit in Venetia (northern Italy), which became known as the Andorfer-Kommando. During Operation Piave (20–28 September 1944) in the Monte Grappa region, Andorfer directed operations that targeted both partisans and civilians. Andorfer ordered the murder of 264 people and the homes of suspected resistance fighters were burned with their occupants inside. He then issued posters promising safe passage or employment in the Todt forced labour organisation to any man who voluntarily surrendered. Hoping to spare their sons, many parents encouraged them to accept the offer. On 26 September 1944, after 31 young men had responded Andorfer ordered their execution. The young men were hanged from trees along three streets in Bassano del Grappa using telephone cables, with cardboard signs reading "Bandit" pinned to their chests. Members of the Italian Fascist youth organisation carried out the executions.

Wounded in the head during the final weeks of the conflict, he was admitted to a Swiss military hospital. Assuming the identity of "Hans Mayer" and posing as a Luftwaffe airman, he was later transferred to the Swiss refugee internment camp at Erlach. On 31 October 1945, Andorfer informed camp officials that he had married another internee, Maria Babette Fürstenberg (née Bloch), a Polish national. In April 1946, the Swiss authorities issued the couple a passport. In June 1946, Andorfer and Fürstenberg fled to Venezuela through Sweden via the Ratline. Both were supported in their escape by the secret organisation ODESSA. In 1959, Andorfer wound up his affairs in Venezuela and moved back to Vienna. In 1964, the Austrian consulate in Hamburg issued him an Austrian passport in his real name.

== Post-war trial and sentence ==
On 3 May 1967, he was arrested in Munich airport on the basis of an international arrest warrant. The Austrian courts initially declined jurisdiction on the grounds that Andorfer held Venezuelan citizenship, and that they had no legal grounds to prosecute him. The West German government secured his extradition in August 1968 to stand trial before the Dortmund Regional Court. On 16 January 1969, The court convicted him of accessory to murder and sentenced him to 2.5 years' imprisonment, for aiding and abetting the murder of "at least 5,500" Jewish prisoners of the Sajmište concentration camp in gas vans. He was released after the court credited his pre-trial detention in Austria against his sentence.
