= Bojan Aleksov =

Serbian activist

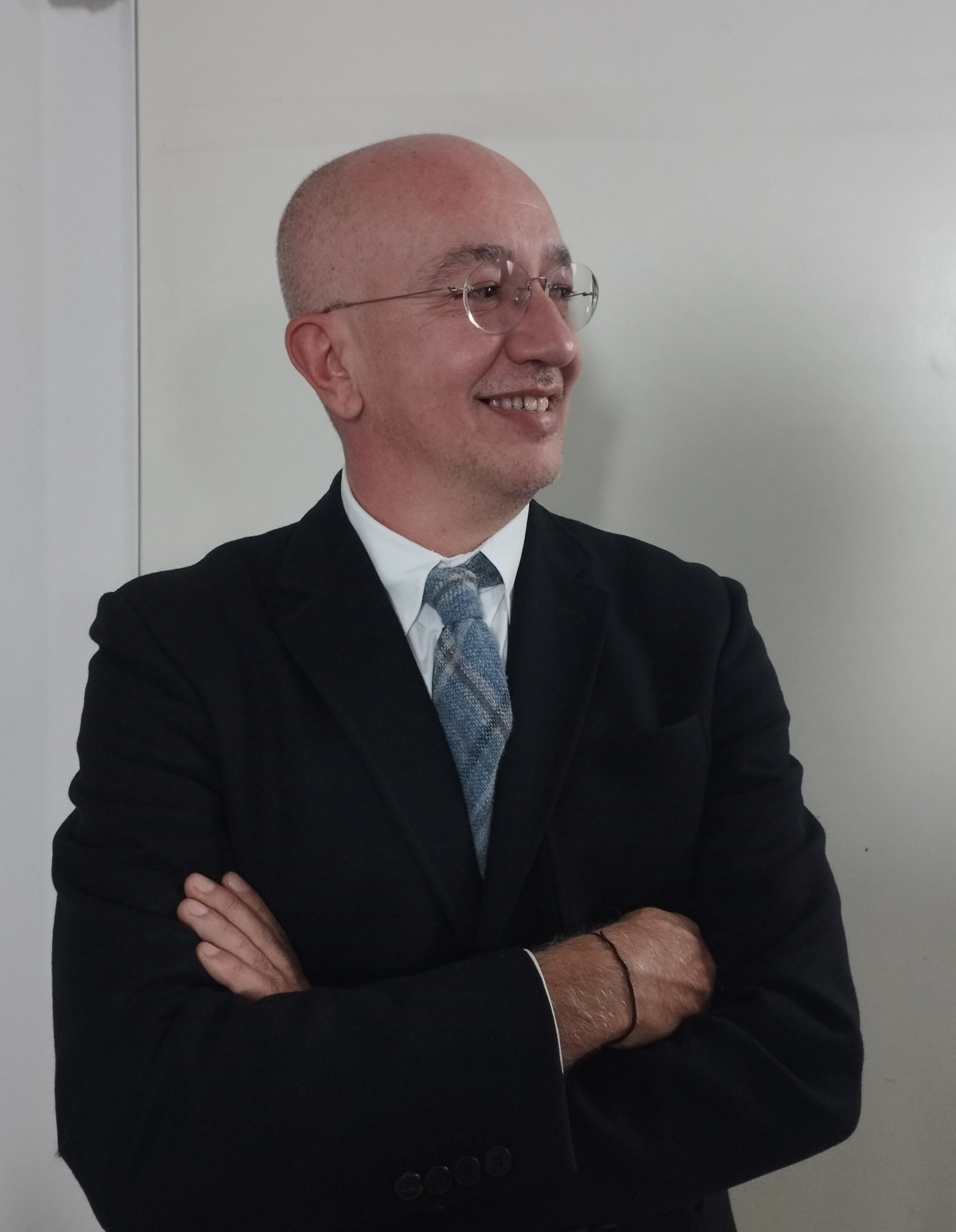
- Bojan Aleksov at LMU Munich, December 2024.
- Born: 1971; Belgrade, Yugoslavia
- Education: University of Belgrade BA; Central European University MA & PhD
- Occupations: Historian; Human rights activist

Bojan Aleksov (born 1971) is a Serbian-born historian and professor of Balkan history at University College London. He is a human rights activist best known as a voice against the Yugoslav Wars through his engagement with the Center for Anti-War Action, Women in Black, and Conscientious Objectors in Serbia. Since 2007 he has been an assistant professor, and since 2025 a full time professor of Balkan history at the University College London's School of Slavonic and East European Studies.

== Early years and education ==
Aleksov was born in Belgrade, Serbia. At the beginning of the war in Croatia in 1991, Aleksov was in the Yugoslav People's Army fulfilling his regular military service. In August, after trying to escape from the service, Aleksov was caught and sent to a military hospital in Sarajevo. He was later released after being certified as "mentally unable to serve in the army."

Aleksov graduated from the University of Belgrade with a B.A. and received a M.A. in 1999, along with his Ph.D. in Comparative History of Central, Southern, and Eastern Europe at the Central European University in Budapest in 2005. His thesis was Religious Dissent in the Age of Modernization and Nationalism: Nazarenes in Hungary and Serbia 1850-1914. Aleksov completed his MA studies in Central European History at the Central European University, Budapest in 1999. His thesis was The Dynamics of Extinction: The Nazarene Religious Community in Yugoslavia after 1945. He received his B.A. degree in history from the University of Belgrade, Serbia in 1998. He was awarded Humboldt fellowship at the Free University of Berlin in 2004 and Max Weber fellowship at the European University Institute in Florence in 2006.

== Career ==
=== Activism ===
In 1991, Aleksov joined anti-war protests organized by the Center for Anti-War Action (CAA), and the anti-militarist peace organization, Women in Black. Aleksov was one of the spokespersons of Conscientious Objectors, where since 1992 he served as an important source of information on conscription and conscientious objection in the Federal Republic of Yugoslavia. He participated in daily vigils in the Pioneer Park giving counseling and distributing alternative information, collecting signatures for the Serbian ballot referendum whether soldiers from Serbia should fight beyond its borders. In the spring of 1992 CAA co-organized large anti-war protests in Yugoslavia. Aleksov attended the annual International Conscientious Objectors Movement meeting, in Southern France in 1992, in Turkey in 1993, Colombia in 1994, and the European Conscientious Objectors Movement meeting in Greece in 1995. He was a speaker at War Resisters International Seminar "The Changing Face of the Military" held in Germany in August 1999.

With Women in Black, Aleksov collected information and reported on mobilizations, trials of objectors and deserters, and resistance to war in Bosnia, Croatia, and Kosovo. He also helped provide lawyers and other forms of care to objectors from Serbia, finding shelter and counseling for deserters coming from Bosnia, and, arranging safe passage to other countries. Bojan Aleksov talked about his activism for the Sarajevo-based KvirArhiv.org (Queer Archive). He is openly gay.

=== Arrest and detention ===
In July 2000. Aleksov was arrested by State Security Police and detained in the central police station in Belgrade for 23 hours. He was forced to write a 12-page statement, dictated to him by the interrogating officer detailing his activities relating to Conscientious Objectors and Women in Black and sign a collaboration agreement with the State Security Police. Amnesty International and War Resisters International wrote public statements of concern and letters of support for Aleksov. Following his release, Aleksov applied for political asylum in Germany. With Slobodan Milošević's overthrow, he withdrew his asylum application and filed a lawsuit against the state of Serbia. In a 12-year legal process, the Appellate Court of Serbia ruled in favor of Aleksov and ordered the state of Serbia to compensate Aleksov for the violation of honor and reputation inflicted by State Security Police.

=== Public lectures and events ===
Aleksov was a guest in a debate held at the War Theatre in Sarajevo on June 22, 2014 and broadcast on the BBC World Service. The theme of the first debate in Bosnia and Herzegovina was the First World War and its influence on nationalism. The debate was hosted by Alan Little. On November 26, 2013. at University College London Aleksov was a chairperson at a roundtable debate with Slavoj Žižek and Srećko Horvat. In 2010, one of Aleksov's lectures in University College London was Who or What Killed Franz Ferdinand?

=== Scholarship ===
Bojan Aleksov explores the nexus of religion and nationalism, the two most powerful identitarian forces in the Balkans looking at historical factors, causality and agency that led to the identification of confessional affiliation and national identity among almost all Balkan nations in the wake of the demise of two Empires (Ottoman and Habsburg), which ruled the region over centuries. He was also part of the project looking at the transnational connections of resisters and resistance movements in Europe during the Second World War.

Aleksov has been collecting and investigating the memoirs of Jewish refugees from (Vienna, Prague, Berlin) who spent war years in the Balkan highlands hiding or joining local resistance movements, reading them as testimonies of an apparent paradox that European backwaters and its peoples, so often considered backward and uncivilised, offered refuge to people escaping from the very capitals of European culture and civilisation. The result of this research was the book Jewish Refugees in the Balkans, 1933-1945. Bojan discussed his book on new books network. Bojan Aleksov talked about his research for the Raymond Nicolet Trust Podcast.

== Selected books and publications ==
- Jewish Refugees in the Balkans, 1933-1945 (2023).
- Wars and Betweeness: Big Powers and Middle Europe 1918-1945 (co-edited with Aliaksandr Piahanau; Central European Press University, 2020).
- "Questioning Western Approaches to Religion in the Former Yugoslavia" in Balkanologie, Volume 15, Issue 1 (2020).
- "Camps as crucibles of transnational resistance" and "Transnational perspectives on Jews in the Resistance" in Fighters Across Frontiers Transnational Resistance in Europe, 1936-48 (2020).
- "Strange bedfellows: British women and Serbs 1717 – 1945" in British-Serbian Relations from the 18th to the 21st Centuries (2018).
- "Religious education in Serbia as a litmus test for church-state relations" in Education in Post-Conflict Transition The Politicization of Religion in School Textbooks (2017).
- "The Vicissitudes of Dositej Obradović's Cult among the Serbs" in Enlightenment and religion in the Orthodox world (2016).
- "Forgotten Yugoslavism and anti-clericalism of Young Bosnians" in Prilozi, Volume 43 (2014).
- "The Serbian Orthodox Church" in Orthodox Christianity and Nationalism in Nineteenth-Century Southeastern Europe (2014).
- "Resisting the Wars in the Former Yugoslavia: An Autoethnography" in Resisting the Evil: [Post-]Yugoslav Anti-War Contention (2012).
- Religious Dissent between the Modern and the National – Nazarenes in Hungary and Serbia 1850–1914 (2009).
- 7000 Years of History: Illustrated Historical Chronology (2004).
- Deserters from the War in Former Yugoslavia (1994).
