= Jarak =

Jarak Јарак (Serbian)
- Village (Selo)
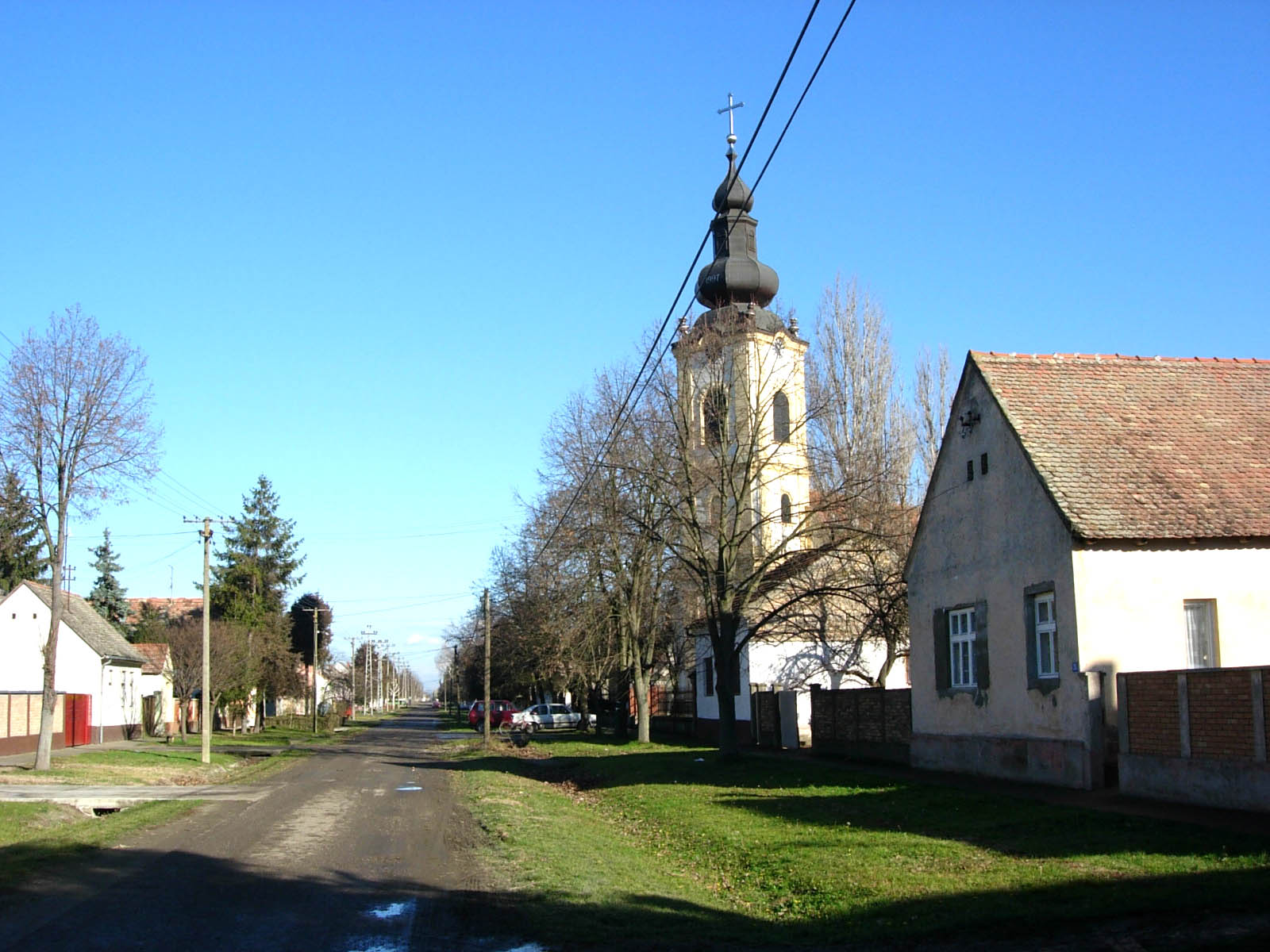

- Location within Vojvodina Location within Serbia Location within Europe
- Coordinates: 44°55′0″N 19°45′26″E
- Country: Serbia
- Province: Vojvodina
- Region: Syrmia
- District: Srem
- Municipality: Sremska Mitrovica

Population (2002)
  - Total: 2,235
- Time zone: UTC+1 (CET)
  - Summer (DST): UTC+2 (CEST)

Jarak (Serbian Cyrillic: Јарак) is a village in Serbia. It is situated in the Sremska Mitrovica municipality, Syrmia District, Vojvodina province. The village has a Serb ethnic majority and its population numbering 2,235 people (2002 census).

== Name ==
In Serbian, the village is known as Jarak (Јарак), in Croatian as Jarak, and in Hungarian as Árki. The word "jarak" means "trench" in Serbian.

== Historical population ==
- 1961: 2,083
- 1971: 2,296
- 1981: 2,092
- 1991: 2,256

== See also ==
- List of places in Serbia
- List of cities, towns and villages in Vojvodina
