= Sajmište concentration camp =

Nazi concentration camp in Serbia

Sajmište
- Concentration camp
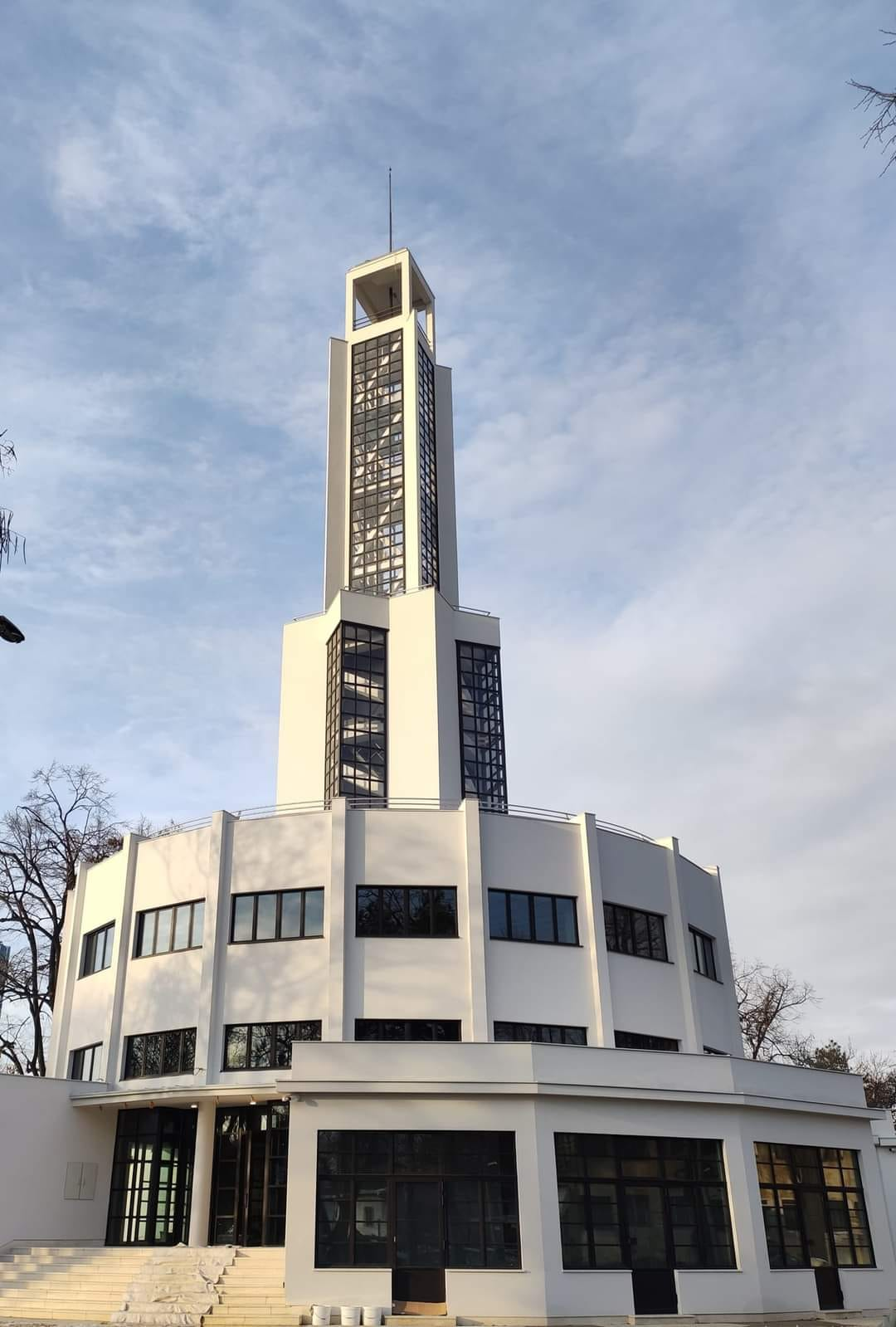
- The central tower of the Sajmište fairgrounds, 2024.

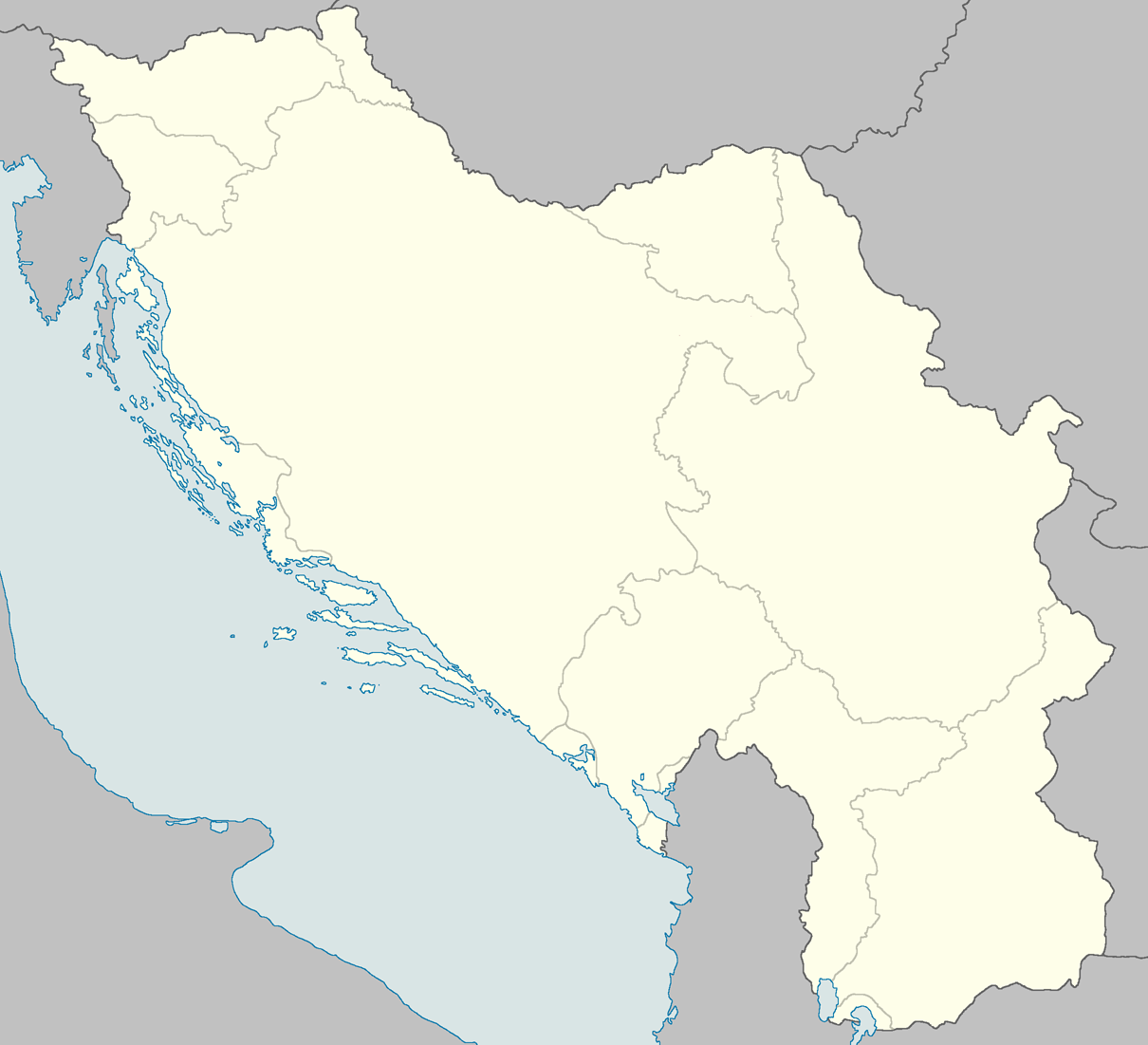
- Location of Sajmište within occupied Yugoslavia
- Coordinates: 44°48′46″N 20°26′42″E
- Location: Staro Sajmište, Independent State of Croatia
- Operated by: Nazi Germany (September 1941 – May 1944); Independent State of Croatia (May–July 1944)
- Original use: Exhibition centre
- Operational: September 1941 – July 1944
- Inmates: Primarily Serbs, Jews, Roma and anti-fascists
- Number of inmates: 50,000
- Killed: 20,000–23,000
- Website: www.starosajmiste.info/en/

The Sajmište Concentration Camp (pronounced [sâjmiːʃtɛ]) was a Nazi German concentration and extermination camp during World War II. It was located at the former Belgrade fairground site near the town of Zemun, in the Independent State of Croatia (NDH). The camp was organized and operated by SS Einsatzgruppen units stationed in occupied Serbia. It became operational in September 1941 and was officially opened on 28 October of that year. The Germans dubbed it the Jewish camp in Zemun (German: Judenlager Semlin). At the end of 1941 and the beginning of 1942, thousands of Jewish women, children and old men were brought to the camp, along with 500 Jewish men and 292 Romani women and children, most of whom were from Niš, Smederevo and Šabac. Women and children were placed in makeshift barracks and suffered during numerous influenza epidemics. Kept in squalid conditions, they were provided with inadequate amounts of food and many froze to death during the winter of 1941–42. Between March and May 1942, the Germans used a gas van sent from Berlin to kill thousands of Jewish inmates.

With the gassings complete, it was renamed Zemun concentration camp (German: Anhaltelager Semlin) and served to hold one last group of Jews who were arrested upon the surrender of Italy in September 1943. During this time it also held captured Yugoslav Partisans, Chetniks, sympathizers of the Greek and Albanian resistance movements, and Serb peasants from villages in other parts of the NDH. An estimated 32,000 prisoners, mostly Serbs, passed through the camp during this period, 10,600 of whom were killed or died due to hunger and disease. Conditions in Sajmište were so poor that some began comparing it to Jasenovac and other large concentration camps throughout Europe. In 1943 and 1944, evidence of atrocities committed in the camp was destroyed by the units of SS-Standartenführer Paul Blobel, and thousands of corpses were exhumed from mass graves and incinerated. In May 1944, the Germans transferred control of the camp over to the NDH, and it was closed that July. Estimates of the number of deaths at Sajmište range from 20,000 to 23,000, with the number of Jewish deaths estimated at 7,000 to 10,000. It is thought that half of all Serbian Jews perished at the camp.

Most of the Germans responsible for the operation of the camp were captured and brought to trial. Several were extradited to Yugoslavia and executed. Camp commander Herbert Andorfer and his deputy Edgar Enge were arrested in the 1960s after many years of hiding. Both were given short prison sentences in West Germany and Austria, respectively, though Enge never served any time given his old age and poor health.

The derelict complex was declared a cultural monument on 9 July 1987. The National Assembly of Serbia adopted the law establishing the Memorial Center "Staro Sajmište" on 24 February 2020. Reconstruction of the central tower, as the first step in the adaptation of the remains into the memorial center and museum began on 27 July 2022.

== Background ==
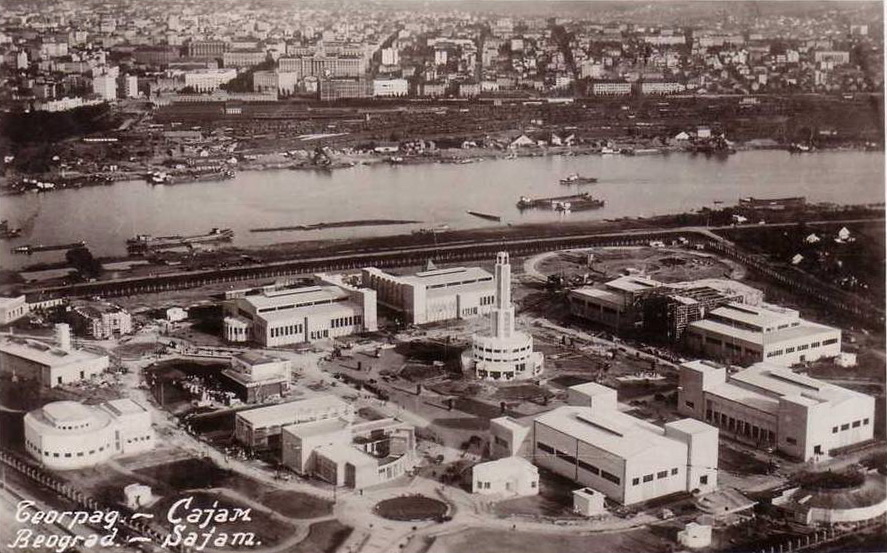
The Belgrade Fair before World War II

The site that became the Sajmište concentration camp during World War II had originally been an exhibition centre built by the Belgrade municipality in 1937 in an attempt to attract international commerce to the city. The centre's modernist pavilions featured elaborate displays of industrial progress and design from European countries, including Germany. Its architectural centerpiece was a large tower which was used by Philips to transmit the earliest television broadcasts in Europe. Much of the centre stood empty and unused until the Axis invasion of Yugoslavia in April 1941. The country was dismembered following the invasion, with Serbia being reduced to Serbia proper, the northern part of Kosovo (around Kosovska Mitrovica), and the Banat, which was occupied by the Germans and placed under the administration of a German military government. Milan Nedić, a pre-war politician who was known to have pro-Axis leanings, was then selected by the Germans to lead the collaborationist Government of National Salvation in the Territory of the Military Commander in Serbia. The civilian administration in the country was headed by SS-Gruppenführer Harald Turner. SS-Standartenführer Wilhelm Fuchs, who had commanded the Einsatzgruppen Serbien, became the Befehlshaber der Sicherheitspolizei und des SD (BdS) and commanded all the security police and intelligence service apparatus until his removal in January 1942. At that time, SS-Gruppenführer August Meyszner was appointed as the Higher SS and Police Leader for Serbia. SS-Standartenführer Emanuel Schäfer, one of Reinhard Heydrich's most trusted officers, replaced Fuchs as BdS. They were responsible for ensuring internal security, fighting opponents of the occupation, and dealing with Jews.

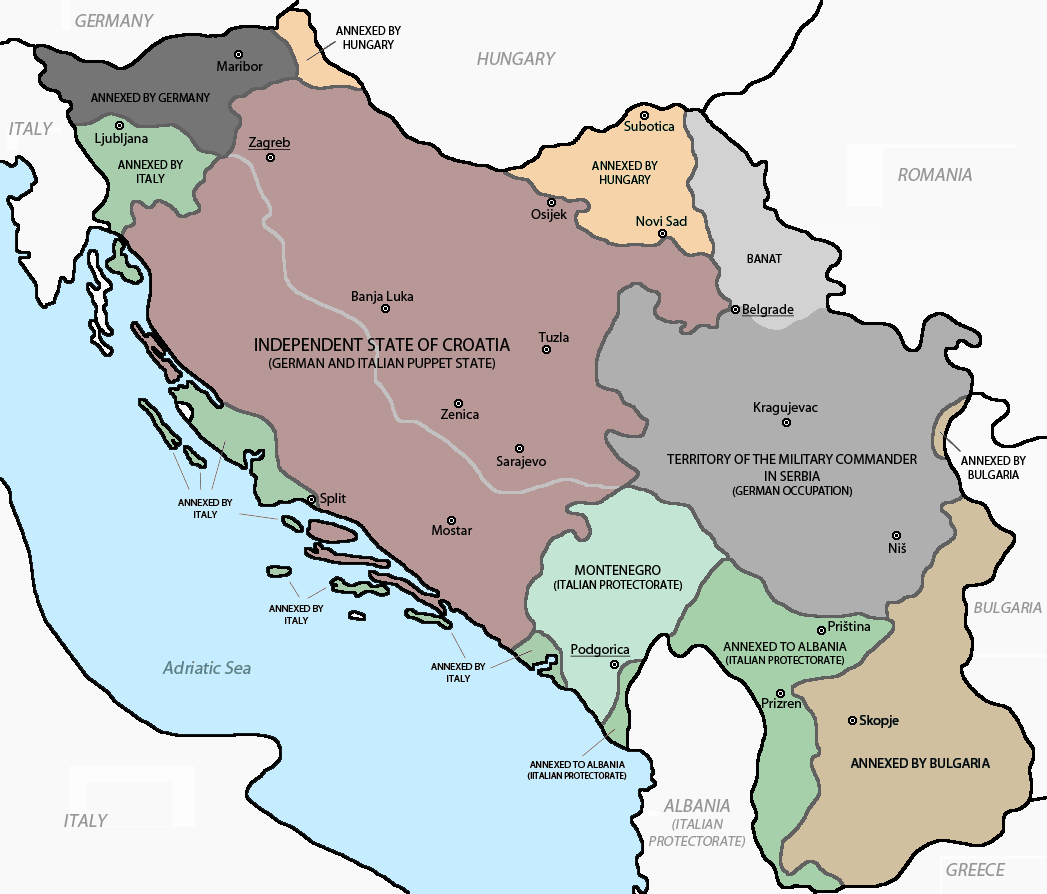
A map showing the Axis occupation of Yugoslavia from 1941–43.

Meanwhile, the extreme Croat nationalist and fascist Ante Pavelić, who had been in exile in Benito Mussolini's Italy, was appointed Poglavnik ("leader") of an Ustaše-led Croatian state – the Independent State of Croatia (often called the NDH, from the Croatian: Nezavisna Država Hrvatska). The NDH combined almost all of modern-day Croatia, all of modern-day Bosnia and Herzegovina and parts of modern-day Serbia into an "Italian-German quasi-protectorate." NDH authorities, led by the Ustaše militia, subsequently implemented genocidal policies against the Serb, Jewish and Romani populations living within the borders of the new state. Zemun, the town where the Sajmište fairgrounds were located, was ceded to the NDH. The occupation of Zemun – during which non-Croats such as Serbs, Jews and Roma were relentlessly persecuted by the Ustaše – would last until late 1944. By this point, more than 25 percent of Zemun's pre-war population of 65,000 had perished.

A large-scale uprising erupted in Serbia following the Axis invasion of the Soviet Union in June 1941. Although they took no part in the rebellion, Jews were targeted for retaliatory execution by the Germans. The Germans soon implemented a number of anti-Jewish laws, and by the end of August 1941, all Serbian Jewish males were interned in concentration camps, primarily at Topovske Šupe in Belgrade.

== History ==
=== Establishment ===
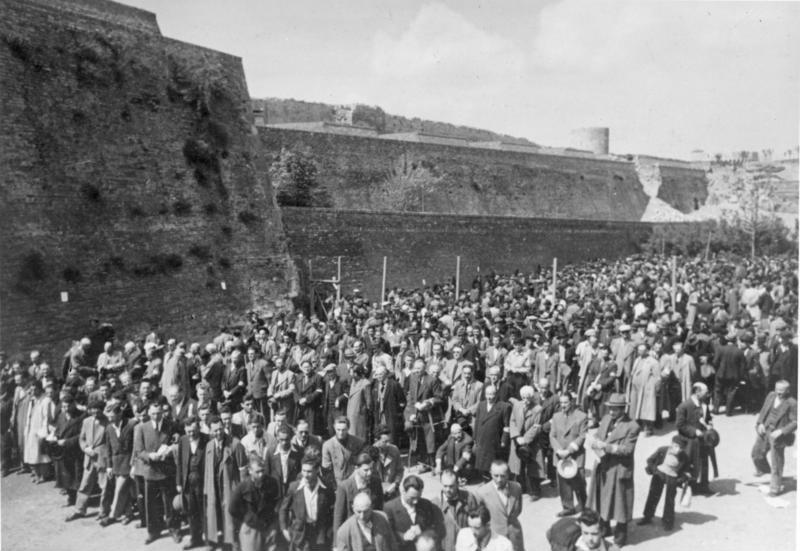
Jews were rounded up by the Germans after the Axis invasion of Yugoslavia.

In the fall of 1941, Turner ordered that all Jewish women and children in Serbia be concentrated in a camp. At first the Germans considered creating a ghetto for the Jews in the Gypsy quarter of Belgrade, but this idea was quickly dismissed due to the area being considered "too filthy and unhygenic." When several other plans to intern the Jewish and Romani populations of Belgrade failed, a concentration camp was established on a peninsula surrounded on three sides by the Sava river, and located in full view of Belgrade's central Terazije Square. The camp was positioned in a manner which made escape almost impossible. It was located near administrative and police centres, as well as the Belgrade central railway station, which allowed for the efficient transport of Jews to the camp from the many towns in the region. Its purpose was to detain Jewish women and children that the Germans claimed "endangered" public safety and the Wehrmacht.

The Germans dubbed Sajmište the "Jewish camp in Zemun" (German: Judenlager Semlin). The camp was intended to hold as many as 500,000 people captured from rebels areas across occupied Yugoslavia. The name "Semlin" was derived from the German word for the former Austro-Hungarian frontier town of Zemun, where the camp was located. Despite being located on the territory of the NDH, it was controlled by the German military police apparatus in occupied Serbia. NDH authorities did not object to its establishment and told the Germans that it could be located on NDH territory as long as its guards were German rather than Serb. Soon after the camp was established, SS-Scharführer Edgar Enge of the Belgrade Gestapo became its commander. Initially, the campgrounds held about 500 male Jewish inmates who were given the task of running the camp's so-called "self-administration" and were made responsible for distributing food, dividing up labour, and organizing a Jewish guard force which patrolled along the camp. The exterior of the camp, however, was guarded on a rotation basis by twenty-five members of Reserve Police Battalion 64. By October, all male Jewish inmates and most male Romani inmates were killed. Most were executed in four major waves, with frequent killings occurring in mid-September and between 9 and 11 October. On each occasion, inmates were told that they were being transported to a camp in Austria with better labour conditions but were instead taken to Jabuka in the Banat or to a firing range on the outskirts of Belgrade, where they were killed. Sajmište officially opened on a wider scale on 28 October 1941. The last of the initial male Jewish inmates were killed on 11 November.

=== Judenlager Semlin ===
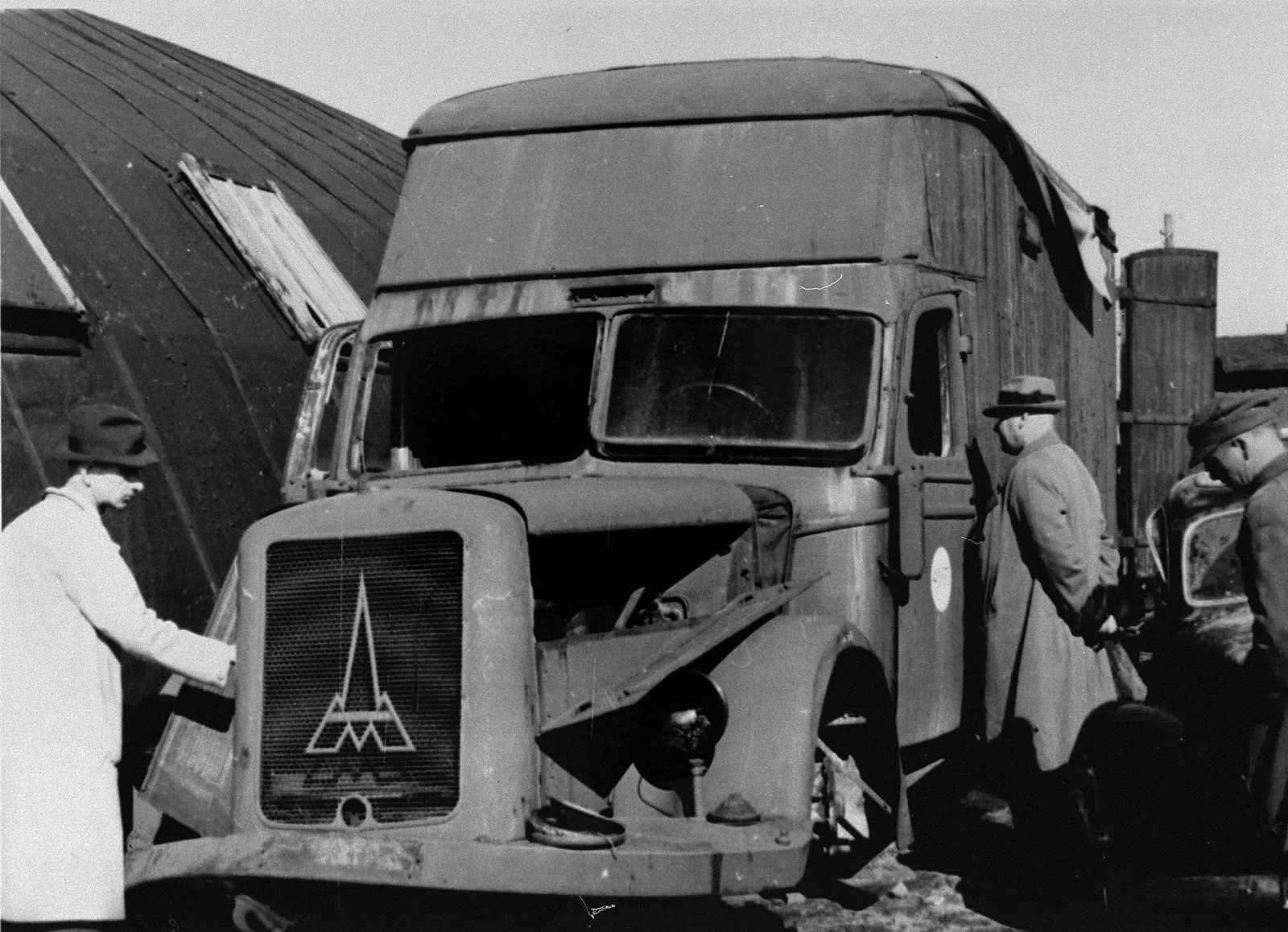
A gas van similar to one used in Sajmište.

At the end of 1941 and the beginning of 1942, approximately 7,000 Jewish women, children and old men were brought to the camp, along with a further 500 Jewish men and 292 Romani women and children. Most of these people were from the outlying Serbian towns, primarily Niš, Smederevo and Šabac. Women and children were placed in makeshift barracks that were barely heated, and whose windows were shattered due to German bombing raids carried out during the invasion of Yugoslavia. Originally constructed as fair pavilions, the largest of these barracks held up to 5,000 prisoners. Inmates suffered during numerous influenza epidemics, slept on wet straw or bare floorboards, and were provided with inadequate amounts of food. Starvation was widespread, and Jewish inmates appealed unsuccessfully to Serbian authorities for more food to be provided to the camp. Consequently, a high number of detainees, especially children, died in late 1941 and early 1942, with many inmates freezing to death in one of the coldest winters on record. The Romani inmates were kept in far more miserable conditions than their Jewish counterparts. They also slept on straw in an unheated hall, but were kept separate from non-Romani prisoners. The majority of Romani inmates were released after six weeks of detention. Most Jewish inmates remained detained, with the exception of ten Jewish women who were married to Christian men.

In January 1942, SS-Untersturmführer Herbert Andorfer was appointed to replace the inexperienced Enge as commander of the camp. Enge was subsequently made Andorfer's deputy. That month, German military authorities demanded the camp be cleared of Jews in order to accommodate the growing number of captives taken in battles with the Partisans. By February the camp held about 6,500 inmates, ten percent of whom were Romani. In early March, Andorfer was informed that a gas van had been sent to the camp from Berlin. The Sauer van had been delivered upon the request of the German military administration chief in Serbia, Harald Turner. Stricken with guilt over having to play a central role in the murder of the Jewish inmates, some of whom he had developed good relations with, Andorfer requested a transfer; this was denied. In order to ensure the quickness and efficiency of the gassings, he made announcements intended to convince the prisoners that they were going to be transferred to another, better-equipped camp. He went so far as to post fictitious camp regulations, and announced that prisoners would be allowed to take their bags with them. Many detainees registered for the supposed transfer, hoping to escape the camp's terrible living conditions. Inmates who had volunteered to leave the previous evening climbed into the van the next day in groups of between 50 and 80. The drivers of the van, SS-Scharführers Meier and Götz, distributed candy to children in order to win their affection. Afterwards, the doors of the van were sealed shut. The van then followed a small car driven by Andorfer and Enge, before crossing the border into German-occupied Serbia. It was here that one of the drivers exited the van and crawled underneath it, diverting its exhaust into the interior of the vehicle and killing the inmates with carbon monoxide gas. The van was then taken to the Avala firing range, where corpses were dumped into mass graves freshly dug by Serbian and Romani prisoners. Such gassings became routine, and the gas van arrived every day except Sunday. Rumours quickly circulated about the gassings, with news reaching German troops stationed in Belgrade and even some Serbians. Consequently, the gas van was nicknamed the "soul killer" (Serbian: dušegupka) by the Serb population exposed to these rumours. It is thought that the gassings took the lives of as many as 8,000 inmates, mostly women and children. The seven Serbian prisoners that had participated in unloading the murdered inmates from the van were shot after the gassings stopped, but the gravedigger, a Serb named Vladimir Milutinović, survived. "Eighty-one or eighty-two trenches were prepared and I helped dig all of them," he recalled. "At least 100 people [fit] into each trench [...] These ones were only for those suffocated in the truck. We dug a different set for those who were shot."

Few inmates remained in the camp after the gassings stopped, mostly non-Jewish women who had been married to Jews. They were released several days later, after being sworn to secrecy. Apart from Sajmište inmates, the 500 patients and staff of the Belgrade Jewish Hospital, as well as Jewish prisoners from the nearby Banjica concentration camp, were also killed in the gas van. The last Jewish prisoner in Sajmište was killed on 8 May 1942, and the gas van used at the camp was returned to Berlin on 9 June 1942. It received a technical upgrade there, and was then transferred to Belarus where it was used to gas Jews in Minsk. Shortly after leading the extermination of the Jewish inmates in Sajmište, Andorfer and Enge were assigned different Security Police roles. Andorfer later received an Iron Cross 2nd Class for running the camp, and won a promotion.

=== Anhaltelager Semlin ===
With the extermination of the original Jewish inmates completed, the camp was renamed Zemun concentration camp (German: Anhaltelager Semlin) and served to hold one last group of Jews who were arrested upon the surrender of Italy in September 1943. It also held captured Yugoslav Partisans, Chetniks, sympathizers of the Greek and Albanian resistance movements, and Serb peasants from villages in the Croatian Ustaše-controlled regions of Srem and Kozara, where they had been detained in the Jasenovac concentration camp. Conditions deteriorated to such an extent that some began comparing it to Jasenovac and other large concentration camps throughout Europe. The camp became the main transit point for Yugoslav prisoners and detainees on their way to labour locations and concentration camps in Germany. An estimated 32,000 mostly Serb prisoners passed through Sajmište during this period, 10,600 of whom were killed or died due to hunger and disease.

Alarmed by the fact that the campgrounds could easily be seen from across the Sava, in late 1943, the new German ambassador to Serbia proposed that the camp be moved deeper into NDH territory, because its "[continuing existence] before the eyes of the people of Belgrade was politically intolerable for reasons of public feeling." His requests were ignored by German authorities. By the end of 1943, the Germans made an effort to erase all traces of the atrocities committed in the camp by burning records, incinerating corpses, and destroying other pieces of evidence. This task was undertaken by SS-Standartenführer Paul Blobel, who arrived in Belgrade in November 1943. Upon arrival, he ordered the head of the local Gestapo, SS-Sturmbannführer Bruno Sattler, to form a special detachment that was to be responsible for the exhumation and burning of bodies. The detachment was led by Lieutenant Erich Grunwald, and composed of ten security policemen and 48 military policemen. The digging battalions were composed of 100 Serbian and Jewish prisoners. Exhumations occurred from December 1943 to April 1944, and thousands of bodies were burned. All the prisoners that were present during the exhumations were shot, except for three Serbs who managed to escape. Allied aircraft bombed Sajmište on 17 April 1944, killing about 100 inmates and inflicting heavy damage to the camp itself. On 17 May 1944, the Germans transferred control of the camp over to the NDH. It was closed that July.

== Aftermath and legacy ==
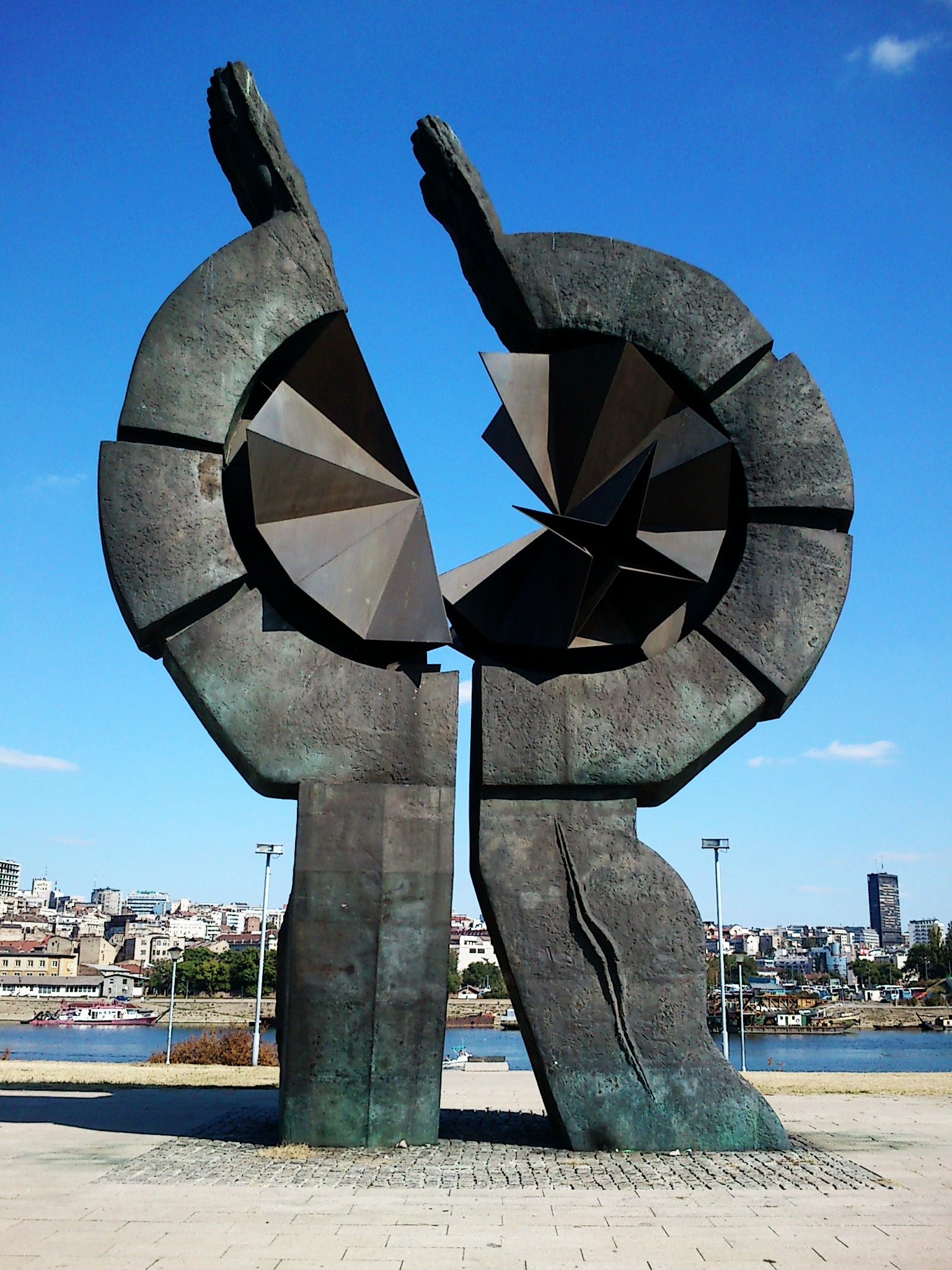
A monument commemorating the victims of the camp

After the war, Yugoslavia's new communist government announced that 100,000 people had passed through Sajmište between 1941 and 1944, half of whom were killed. The Yugoslav State War Crimes Commission later estimated that as many as 40,000 may have been killed in the camp, including 7,000 Jews. According to the Helsinki Committee for Human Rights in Serbia, the death toll was exaggerated by the communists for political purposes, and the real number of inmates was about 50,000, with 20,000 killed. It is estimated that half of all Serbian Jews perished in the camp. The Staro Sajmište memorial cites 23,000 fatalities, of which 10,000 were Jewish.

Most of those responsible for the camp's operation were captured and brought to trial. Following the war, many prominent German officials, including Turner, Fuchs and Meyszner, were extradited to Yugoslavia by the Allies, and subsequently executed. Andorfer escaped to Venezuela with the assistance of the Roman Catholic Church. He returned to Austria in the 1960s, and was subsequently apprehended and tried on the minor charge of being an accessory to murder, for which he was sentenced to 2½ years' imprisonment. Andorfer's deputy Enge was apprehended in the 1960s and sentenced to 1½ years' imprisonment. He avoided serving his sentence due to his old age and poor health. Guards suspected of executing prisoners were never tried, though they served as eyewitnesses in several trials in West Germany.

Sajmište stood abandoned until 1948, when it was transformed into a youth workers' headquarters during the construction of New Belgrade.

=== Memorial ===
Belgrade Jews murdered during the Holocaust, including those at Sajmište, were not commemorated by Yugoslavia's post-war Communist government until 30 years after the war ended. The old Sajmište fairgrounds are marked by small plaques and a monument to commemorate those detained or killed in the camp. The plaques were dedicated in 1974 and 1984, respectively. On 9 July 1987, the Sajmište fairgrounds were granted cultural landmark status by the government of Yugoslavia. A monument, 10 m (33 ft) high and created by the artist Mića Popović, was erected on the banks of the Sava on 22 April 1995, marking 50 years of victory over the Nazism and Serbian Holocaust Remembrance Day. No memorial centres or museums have ever been built on the former campgrounds. The campgrounds are now used to house low-income residents.

In February 1992, as provided by the detailed urban plan, the neighborhood was to be fully reconstructed to its pre-war look, an idea opposed by some architects, with added memorial and commemorative objects. The entire complex was to be transformed into one large memorial, but it all remained on paper. The idea was constantly present, gaining media and political momentum in the 2010s, but as of 2018 nothing has been actually done.

On the section facing the access to the Branko's Bridge, there were tumbled remains of two massive concrete columns, with their foundations. They were part of the camp's gate. In 2014, sculptor and professor Tomislav Todorović, with minimal intervention, shaped them into two heads, with iron bars forming the face (eyes, mouth) and spiky hair. The readymade work was described as an artifact, monument and work of art, all in one.

In November 2018 it was announced that a monument to the humanitarian Diana Budisavljević will be placed along the quay, next to the already existing memorial. Budisavljević saved 15,000 children (12,000 of which survived) from perishing in the Concentration camps in the Independent State of Croatia, operated by the Ustaše regime during World War II. City decided to erect a monument in her memory already in October 2015, but only now set the location. The monument was to be finished and dedicated in the second half of 2019. No work has been done regarding this project and in November 2019 city announced the monument to Budisavljević will be erected across the Sava, in the old section of the city.

On 24 February 2020, the National Assembly of Serbia adopted the Law on Memorial Center "Staro Sajmište". It is organized as the state cultural institute for, among other duties, keeping the memory on victims of the Nazi concentration camps Judenlager Semlin and Anhaltelager Semlin. For the first time, one law in Serbia recognized the genocide in the Independent State of Croatia, the Holocaust and the Samudaripen, as World War II genocides of the Serbs, Jews and Romani people, respectively. The center will also adapt the remains into the proper memorial. The law will be applied from January 2021.

In June 2021, Belgrade's mayor Zoran Radojičić announced reconstruction of the complex, which should include complete restoration of all structures, starting with the central tower in 2022.

In the summer of 2021, a group of fourteen high school students from various Serbian towns started a project called "Light of the fireflies". Joined by the historians and artists from Serbia and Germany, the students by December 2021 created an app, a virtual tour of the former camp. Archive footage and files, original testimonies, letters and photographs served as the basis, which was then upgraded with actors, scenic recreations and light installations. "Light of the fireflies" has been described as the "virtual monument" for both the victims and the locality itself, marking 80 years since the formation of the camp.

Preparatory works on the reconstruction of the central tower started on 27 July 2022. Project includes adaptation of the complex into two museum sections, one for the each phase of the camp's history. Scholar and diplomat Krinka Vidaković Petrov, former ambassador to Israel, has been appointed the director of the memorial center. The tower was in such bad shape that it had to be demolished and rebuilt according to the original project, with addition of panoramic elevator. Deadline is the end of 2023, after which the Italian pavilion and the Pavilion of Nikola Spasić will be reconstructed. Plan is to renovate all pre-war pavilions.

However, in March 2023, the German pavilion was partially demolished. After public and some experts' furor, the Institute for the Protection of Cultural Monuments said the protected area includes only the original 1937 fairground area. Though part of the complex, German pavilion was added in 1938 and is part of "protected surroundings". A short thoroughfare which would connect streets Vladimira Popovića and Nikola Tesla Boulevard will be built instead. The institute called the planned street a "strategic decision" and "public interest" which in "any way, form or content will not endanger the protected area", and as such has been confirmed in all previous plans from 1987, 1989 or 1992. Calls for the extension of the protected area were ignored, including those by the Holocaust Research and Education Center (CIEH).

Ministry of culture issued a statement claiming the entire area of Staro Sajmište, including German pavilion, is under preliminary protection, so it had to be treated as being protected until the protection is confirmed or denied. Members of the Together party then physically prevented demolition of the pavilion several times during June. The company which demolished it claimed it won the job at tender, but were unable to disclose any contracts or permits, nor they placed legally obligatory info board at construction site, Jointly with CIEH, Together presented claims there is a non-surveyed mass grave beneath the pavilion. Former workers which adapted the pavilion into the vehicle repair service "Rade Končar" after the war, left statements that they discovered dead bodies but were told to rebury them and cover them with concrete. The authorities were then asked to postpone demolition for only a month so that area can be surveyed, but the building was demolished on 3 July 2023.

=== Pseudohistorical controversies ===
According to Jovan Byford, from the very beginning Sajmište was one of the main motives of the struggle of Serbian and Croatian quasi-historians. Authors in Serbia at the end of the 1980s increasingly claimed that Sajmište was located on the territory of the Independent State of Croatia. Most often, the intention was not to "transfer" victims of this camp to Croatia, but to point out that the collaborationist government in Serbia had no influence on the events in this camp since Sajmište was under German administration and on the territory of another state. According to some authors in Serbia, Nedić's government in Belgrade cannot bear responsibility for the Holocaust. This argument was also used by the collaborators in post-war trials. However, those who saw the fact that Sajmište was formally located on the territory of the Independent State of Croatia, they saw confirmation that it was an Ustasha camp. In a 1990 Politika article, Sajmište is mentioned along with Jasenovac and Jadovno, as the site of an Ustasha crime against Jewish, Serbs and Roma. Authors from Croatia responded to such claims with a counterattack. Apart from disputing the claim that Sajmište was an Ustasha camp (especially not at the time when Jews were imprisoned there), they tried to prove that the Serbs were the biggest executioners in it.

Croatian author Anto Knežević caused considerable controversy in May 1993 when he suggested that Serbs, not Germans, had been responsible for running the camp. This claim was vehemently denied by Jewish historians and Belgrade's Jewish community.

=== Building reuse controversies ===
The neglected and desolate complex housed in time some prominent artists (painters and sculptors) as former fair buildings were awarded to them as their ateliers. Also, some other facilities moved-in over time, like the kafanas and gyms, but the major public controversy arose in April 2019 when it was announced that a privately owned kindergarten will be open in one of the buildings. The investor, Milorad Krsmanović, purchased the building (the Simić pavilion) in 1998, but the court later voided the contract, which didn't prevent him from using the venue as a disco club, gallery, restaurant and gym since then. A fierce public debate ensued, including city administration asking for the state government to "re-think about the permit", government claiming that there is no legal cause to stop it, Jewish and parents organizations which are against it and the investor who blames the state of trying to rob him. The debate also pointed again to the 75 years long inability of the state to arrange the complex properly.

It took two years since the law was introduced, to preparatory works on the camp's adaptation to start. Project Belgrade Waterfront was named as one of the possible reasons for dragging on with the reconstruction of the former complex, as the tenants of the luxurious and elite residential complex across the Sava have a direct view on the former camp area.

=== Philosophical assessment ===
Jovana Krstić, a Serbian architect, said that Staro Sajmište is the unique phenomenon in the world as no other localities merged the symbols of prosperity and downfall in such a unique and tragic way. She identified the locality with Pierre Nora's term lieux de memoire, a place where the memory persists even though the locality changed its appearance and stopped being a milieux de memoire, the real environment of a memory. Writer David Albahari wrote: "It's a place that doesn't simply humiliate by its inhumanity, but also by its complete exposing to Belgrade, which silently watched it from across the river".

== Bibliography ==
- Browning, Christopher (2007). The Origins of the Final Solution: The Evolution of Nazi Jewish Policy, September 1939 – March 1942 (2nd ed.). Lincoln, Nebraska: University of Nebraska Press. ISBN 978-0-80320-392-1.
- Byford, Jovan (2011), "The Collaborationist Administration and the Treatment of the Jews in Nazi-occupied Serbia", in Ramet, Sabrina P.; Listhaug, Ola (eds.), Serbia and the Serbs in World War Two, London, England: Palgrave Macmillan, pp. 109–127, ISBN 978-0-230-27830-1
- Cohen, Philip J. (1996). Serbia's Secret War: Propaganda and the Deceit of History. College Station, Texas: Texas A&M University Press. ISBN 978-0-89096-760-7.
- Crowe, David M. (2000). "The Roma Holocaust". In DeCoste, Frederick C.; Schwartz, Bernard (eds.). The Holocaust's Ghost: Writings on Art, Politics, Law and Education. Edmonton, Alberta: University of Alberta Press. ISBN 978-0-88864-337-7.
- Glenny, Misha (2011). The Balkans: Nationalism, War, and the Great Powers, 1804–2011. London: Penguin Books. ISBN 978-1-77089-274-3.
- Goldstein, Ivo (1999). Croatia: A History. Montreal: McGill-Queen's Press. ISBN 978-0-7735-2017-2.
- Hoare, Marko Attila (2007). The History of Bosnia: From the Middle Ages to the Present Day. London: Saqi. ISBN 978-0-86356-953-1.
- Israeli, Raphael (2013). The Death Camps of Croatia: Visions and Revisions, 1941–1945. New Brunswick, New Jersey: Transaction Publishers. ISBN 978-1-4128-4975-3.
- Jakovljević, Branislav (2016). Alienation Effects: Performance and Self-Management in Yugoslavia, 1945–91. Ann Arbor, Michigan: University of Michigan Press. ISBN 978-0-4720-5314-8.
- Kenrick, Donald; Puxon, Grattan (2009). Gypsies Under the Swastika. Hatfield, Hertfordshire: University of Hertfordshire Press. ISBN 978-1-902806-80-8.
- Kroener, Bernard R.; Müller, Rolf-Dieter; Umbreit, Hans, eds. (2000). Germany and the Second World War, Volume 5: Organization and Mobilization of the German Sphere of Power. Part I. Wartime Administration, Economy, and Manpower Resources 1939-1941. Vol. 5. New York, New York: Oxford University Press. ISBN 978-0-19-822887-5.
- Manoschek, Walter (2000). "The Extermination of the Jews in Serbia". In Herbert, Ulrich (ed.). National Socialist Extermination Policies: Contemporary German Perspectives and Controversies. New York: Berghahn Books. pp. 163–186. ISBN 978-1-57181-751-8.
- Matthäus, Jürgen (2013). Jewish Responses to Persecution: 1941–1942. Lanham, Maryland: AltaMira Press. ISBN 978-0-7591-2259-8.
- Mazower, Mark (2008). Hitler's Empire: How the Nazis Ruled Europe. New York: The Penguin Press. ISBN 978-1-594-20188-2.
- Mojzes, Paul (2011). Balkan Genocides: Holocaust and Ethnic Cleansing in the 20th Century. Lanham, Maryland: Rowman & Littlefield. ISBN 978-1-4422-0665-6.
- Norris, David A. (2009). Belgrade: A Cultural History. Oxford: Oxford University Press. ISBN 978-0-19-970452-1.
- Pavlowitch, Stevan K. (2002). Serbia: The History of an Idea. New York: New York University Press. ISBN 978-0-8147-6708-5.
- Pavlowitch, Stevan K. (2007). Hitler's New Disorder: The Second World War in Yugoslavia. New York: Columbia University Press. ISBN 978-1-85065-895-5.
- Ramet, Sabrina P. (2006). The Three Yugoslavias: State-Building and Legitimation, 1918–2005. Bloomington, Indiana: Indiana University Press. ISBN 978-0-253-34656-8.
- Singleton, Frederick Bernard (1985). A Short History of the Yugoslav Peoples. Cambridge: Cambridge University Press. ISBN 978-0-521-27485-2.
- Shelach, Menachem (1989). "Sajmište: An Extermination Camp in Serbia". In Marrus, Michael Robert (ed.). The Victims of the Holocaust. The Nazi Holocaust. Vol. 2. Berlin: Walter de Gruyter. pp. 1168–1186. ISBN 978-3-11-096872-9.
- Tomasevich, Jozo (2001). War and Revolution in Yugoslavia, 1941–1945: Occupation and Collaboration. Stanford, California: Stanford University Press. ISBN 978-0-8047-3615-2.

=== Journals ===
- Vasiljević, Branka (22 November 2018). "Diani Budisavljević spomenik na Savskom keju" [Monument to Diana Budisavljević on the Sava quay]. Politika (in Serbian). Belgrade.
- Mučibabić, Daliborka; Vuković, Ana (13 April 2019). "Da li je obdaništu mesto u bivšem logoru smrti" [Is the former death camp a place for kindergarten]. Politika (in Serbian). Belgrade. p. 1 & 13.
- Mučibabić, Daliborka (13 June 2010). "Oronuli svedok stvaranja i stradanja" [Desolate witness of both the creation and the ordeal]. Politika (in Serbian). Belgrade.
- Krstić, Jovanka (22 September 2018). "Спомен, омен или Голем" [Memorial, omen or Golem]. Politika-Kulturni dodatak, year LXII, No. 24 (in Serbian). Belgrade. p. 5.
- Aleksić, Dejan (27 November 2019). "Novi spomenici od Savskog keja do Taša" [New monuments from Sava Quay to Taš]. Politika (in Serbian). Belgrade.
- Čekerevac, Mirjana (25 February 2020). "Усвојен Закон о центру "Старо сајмиште"" [Law on the "Staro Sajmište" Center adopted]. Politika (in Serbian). Belgrade.
- Vučković, Nenad (16 June 2020). "Kapija logora Staro Sajmište" [Gate of the Staro Sajmište camp]. Politika (in Serbian). Belgrade.
- Vuković, Ana (29 June 2021). "Догодине обнова Централне куле" [Renovation of Central tower next year]. Politika (in Serbian). Belgrade. p. 16.
- Kurteš, Aleksandra (13 November 2021). "Đaci i umetnici kreirali virtuelni obilazak Starog sajmišta" [Students and artists created virtual tour of Staro Sajmište]. Politika (in Serbian). Belgrade. p. 15.
- Solomun, Špiro (20 November 2019). "Memorijali Beograda" [Memorials of Belgrade]. Politika (in Serbian). Belgrade. pp. 26–27.
- Janković, Milan (1 August 2022). "Од један до пет - Меморијални центар" [One to five - Memorial center]. Politika (in Serbian). Belgrade. p. 13.
- Ćurčić, Mina (28 July 2022). "Враћајући дуг прецима опомињемо потомке" [By returning debt to the ancestors, we are warning the descendants]. Politika (in Serbian). Belgrade. p. 1 & 5.
- Aranđelović, Višnja (9 August 2022). "Počinje obnova centralne kule na Starom sajmištu" [Reconstruction of the central tower in Staro Sajmište begins]. Politika (in Serbian). Belgrade. p. 1 & 7.
- Ćirić, Sonja (6 March 2023). "Porušen Nemački paviljon: Zašto je Staro sajmište delimični spomenik kulture" [German pavilion demolished: Why is Staro Sajmište partial cultural monument]. Vreme (in Serbian). Belgrade.
- Mučibabić, Daliborka; Aleksić, Dejan (9 March 2023). "Nemački paviljon ruše, ne pripada spomeniku kulture" [German pavilion is being demolished, it is not part of the cultural monument]. Politika (in Serbian). Belgrade. p. 16.
- Mučibabić, Daliborka (10 March 2023). "Zavod: nije moguće zadržavanje Nemačkog paviljona" [Institute: It is not possible to keep German pavilion]. Politika (in Serbian). Belgrade. p. 16.
- Ćirić, Sonja (10 June 2023). "Đorđe Miketić: Zaustavili smo bager da ne sruši Nemački paviljon" [Đorđe Miketić: We stopped excavator from demolishing German pavilion]. Vreme (in Serbian). Belgrade.
- Opačić, Ana (12 June 2023). "Članovi stranke Zajedno zaustavili rušenje Nemačkog paviljona na Starom sajmištu" [Members of Together party stopped demolition of German pavilion in Staro Sajmište]. N1 (in Serbian). Belgrade.
- Ćirić, Sonja (3 July 2023). "Nemački paviljon logora Staro sajmište je ipak srušen" [German pavilion demolished after all]. Vreme (in Serbian). Belgrade.
