= Mačva operation =

German military operation in 1941

- Part of the Uprising in Serbia during World War II in Yugoslavia
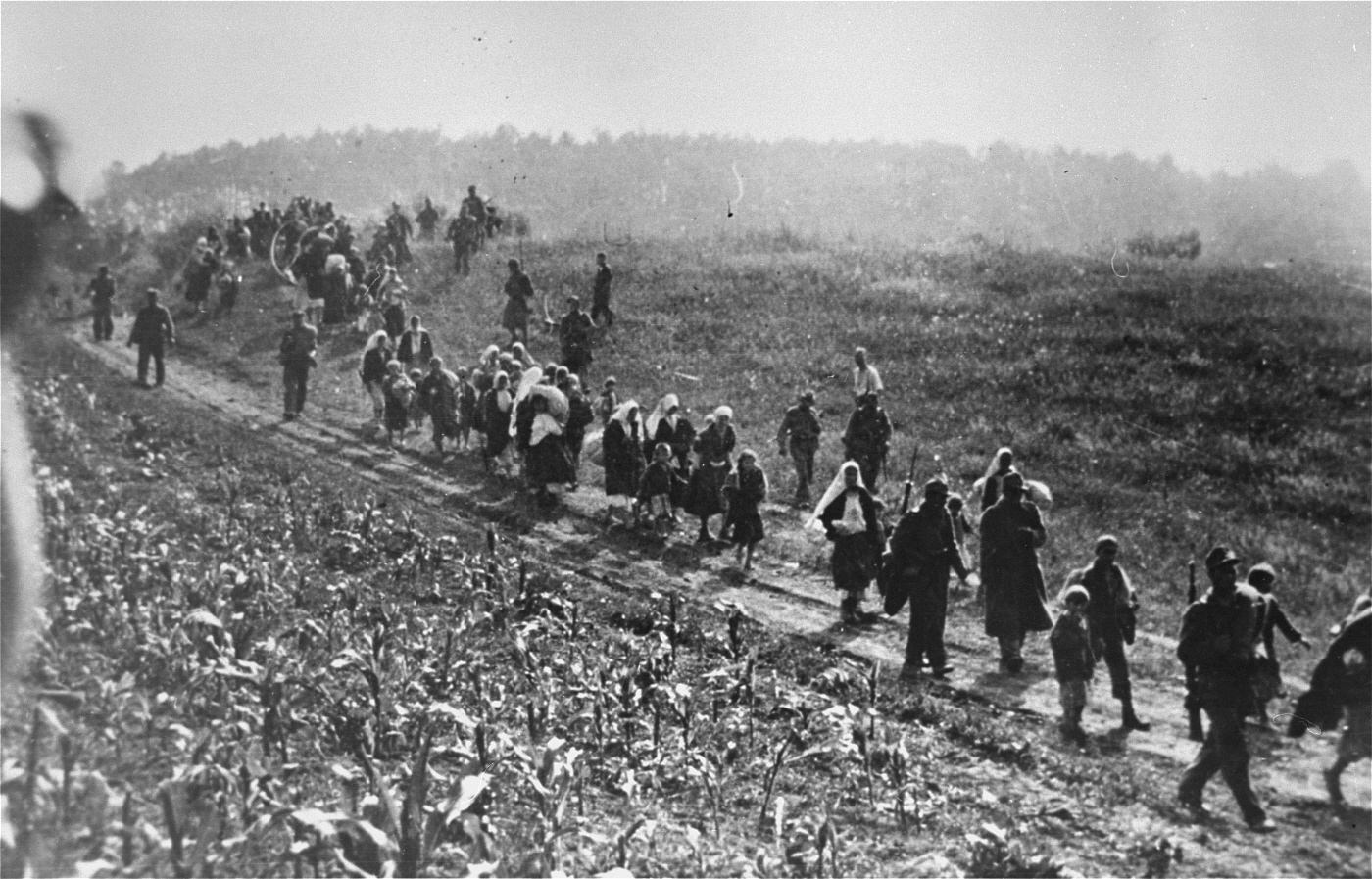
- German soldiers, aided by Ustaše lead a column of Serb civilians to the Šabac internment camp
Date	24 September – 9 October 1941
Location	Western Serbia, Territory of the Military Commander in Serbia (now in Serbia)
Result	Failure of Axis forces to capture or destroy rebel forces which retreated from Mačva; massive reprisals against civilians

Belligerents
Yugoslavia Communist Party of Yugoslavia	Germany; Independent State of Croatia; Hungary

Commanders and leaders
Yugoslavia: Dragoslav Račić; Bogdan Ilić – Cerski Communist Party of Yugoslavia: Nebojša Jerković	Germany: Franz Böhme; Walter Hinghofer; Croatia: Slavko Kvaternik

Units involved
Chetniks: Cer Detachment companies: Čokešina; Mačva; Machine gun; Prnjavor; Martinović-Zečević unit; Partisans Detachments: Mačvanski or Podrinski Detachment; Posavski; Valjevski	Wehrmacht: 704th Division; 3rd battalion of the 724th Infantry regiment; 718th Division; 5th company of 750th regiment of; 342nd Infantry Division; 697 Infantry Regiment; 698 Infantry Regiment; 699 Infantry Regiment; 125th Infantry Regiment; squadron of Junkers Ju 87; Ustaše Militia unknown unit; Einsatzstaffel; Hungarian Danube river fleet

Strength
1,500 Military Chetniks; 1,100 Partisans	More than 12,000 soldiers, 10 tanks, 16 heavy guns: Unknown; 300 Einsatzstaffel

Casualties and losses
742 rebels killed; Civilians: about 6,000 killed; 21,500 imprisoned; most of the populated places in Mačva completely burned	The 342nd Infantry Division had 32 dead and about 130 wounded soldiers

The Mačva operation or Cleaning Up the Sava Crescent (Serbian: Чишћење лука Саве, German: Säuberung des Save-Bogens) was a German military operation during the uprising in the German-occupied territory of Serbia. This operation was in some contemporary German documents and in some works was referred to as operation Cleansing of Mačva.

The aim of operation was the destruction of rebel forces of Chetniks and Partisans in the region of Mačva and their headquarters on the mountain Cer-Iverak and committing mass massacres of the local population with the intention to set a "terrifying example" to the rest of the population of Serbia.

The commander of the German forces was the newly appointed military commander of the occupied territory Franz Böhme who brought the 342nd Infantry Division with 12,000 soldiers of younger age from France to western Serbia to support poorly equipped and undertrained soldiers of older age in the 718th Division and parts of the 704th Division.

The operation started on 24 September 1941 when 342nd Infantry Division crossed river Sava and attacked rebel forces besieging Šabac who retreated toward Cer-Iverak mountain. The German forces, supported by the Ustaše Militia, organized massive massacres of the civilian population and killed about 6,000 and imprisoned more than 21,000 civilians. The operation ended on 9 October 1941 with the failure of Axis forces to destroy rebels and their headquarters because the rebel forces were forced to retreat to the south after suffering casualties of 742 men. To complete the aim of this operation and prepare preconditions to suppress the uprising in the rest of Serbia, Böhme ordered another military operation (Cer-Iverak) and series of other operations that eventually crushed the Uprising in Serbia, with total number of about 4,000 rebels killed during the uprising and about 35,000 civilians killed in reprisals.

== Background ==
At the beginning of the Uprising in Serbia the Axis forces were unable to suppress the uprising because of the engagement of the Wehrmacht at Eastern Front. That is why the joint forces of the Yugoslav Army and the Yugoslav communist party managed to capture substantial territory in the Western part of the German-occupied Serbia.

On 16 September 1941, to secure the supply routes of his troops through Western Serbia, Hitler ordered Wilhelm List to suppress the uprising in Serbia reinforce the troops in Serbia. On the same day, Hitler appointed Franz Böhme, who at that time was a commander of the 18th Army Corps in Greece, on the position of the military commander of German-occupied Serbia. Böhme arrived to Serbia on 19 September 1941 and two days later, on 21 September 1941, he issued the order for the operation "Cleaning Up the Sava Crescent". This operation was one of many Axis offensive operations organized in Summer and Autumn 1941 against rebels in Serbia. The German commanders knew that it was impossible to suppress the uprising in all parts of Serbia at once. That is why they first decided to clean region of the Sava crescent, then western parts of Serbia and Šumadija. Only after successful cleansing of western Serbia, German command planned to organize cleansing of the region around Bor in eastern Serbia from rebel forces.

The aims of operation were:

- destruction of the rebel forces of communist led Partisans and Yugoslav Army in the Fatherland and capture of rebel leaders on mountain Cer
- capture of all male population of the targeted region and mass massacre of its population to set a "terrifying example" to whole country with intention to suppress the uprising and strengthen the influence of Nedić regime.

The operation "Cleaning Up the Sava Crescent" included capture of Šabac and its surroundings and operation "Mačva" (until 27 September) and operation "Cer—Iverak" (8 September – 9 October 1941) and was followed by the series of military operations that lasted until 4 December 1941.

== Forces ==
=== Axis forces ===
Before Operation Barbarossa the Wehrmacht had withdrawn its combat units from German-occupied Serbia. At the beginning of the uprising in Serbia, the German forces were limited to only four divisions of poorly equipped and untrained soldiers of older age who were at best able to perform as occupational forces, but not as combat forces against the prolonged rebel activities. At the beginning of the uprising in Serbia German Field Marshall Wilhelm List requested reinforcement of his troops with one combat division, but his request was refused because the German command did not want to weaken its forces during the operations on Eastern Front. On 13 September 1941 List again requested additional infantry and armored units as reinforcements to his forces in Serbia, and this time his request was accepted. The 342nd Infantry Division with 12,000 soldiers commanded by Walter Hinghoffer moved from France to Western Serbia to carry out the order of the new military commander Böhme to "clean the Sava crescent". It was composed of the 697th, 698th and 699th Infantry Regiments. The 125th Infantry Regiment arrived from Greece to Belgrade to participate in this operation. To clean the area between river Sava, river Drina and mountain Cer the Böhme also engaged the 718th Division that came from Bijeljina and parts of the 704th Division that came from Valjevo.

NDH General Slavko Kvaternik offered to put on disposal at least 12 battalions or more. Eventually, six battalions of the Ustaše Militia and Croatian Home Guard participated in this operation. At the beginning of September 1941 the representative of Germany Siegfried Kache, leader of German population in the NDH, Branimir Altagayer, župan of Vuka and other German and NDH representatives agreed to dispatch one company of Einsatzstaffel with 300 soldiers to participate in the operation against Partisan and Chetnik forces in Mačva waged between 24 September and 7 November 1941.

The Axis forces were supported by squadron of Junkers Ju 87 and Hungarian Danube river fleet of two River gunboats and one motorboat.

=== Rebel forces ===
When German forces started with the operation the rebel forces were concentrated around Šabac during their Attack on Šabac that started three days earlier.

The Chetnik Cer Detachment led by Dragoslav Račić was composed of the following companies:

- Cer company commanded by the Lieutenant Ratko Teodosijević
- Čokešina company
- Mačva company commanded by Lieutenant Nikola Sokić
- Machine gun company commanded by Lieutenant Voja Tufegdžić
- Prnjavor company
- Martinović-Zečević unit commanded by Vlada Zečević and Ratko Martinović

The communist forces were composed of the following Detachments: Podrinjski, Posavski and Valjevski and commanded by Nebojša Jerković.

== The operation ==
=== "Mačva" ===
Initially, Böhme planned to cross river Drina with 342nd division and to destroy rebels in the Mačva region attacking them from south toward north. He changed his mind because he was concerned that this tactic would expose flanks of the 342nd division to attacks of rebel forces from mountain Cer-Iverak. Based also on the proposal of Kvaternik, who pointed to the experience from the 1914 Battle of Cer when the majority of Austro-Hungarian troops attacked Serbia crossing the Drina only to be defeated by the Serbian army, Böhme adopted the plan to attack rebels with troops crossing river Sava. The final plan for the cleansing operation was simple: to preserve an element of surprise, the 342nd division would be unloaded in the NDH, cross Sava river, clean region of Mačva and then to advance into the rebel-controlled territory in direction north–south. The 342nd Infantry Division arrived to Srem in period between 19 and 21 September. The rebel Attack on Šabac that began on 21 September 1941 has hastened the military engagement of the 342nd Infantry Division.

The operation began on 24 September 1941, with the arrival of the 342nd Infantry Division which attacked rebel forces used during the attack on Šabac. According to some indications, the Partisans retreated from Šabac on 24 September 1941 while Račić and his Chetniks continued with the battle until 26 September 1941. Some authors like Miletić refer to the first three days of combat engagement of the 342nd Infantry Division as part of the Attack on Šabac, emphasizing that the operation Cleaning Up the Sava Crescent began on 28 September 1941, while other sources emphasize that the operation started on 24 September 1941.

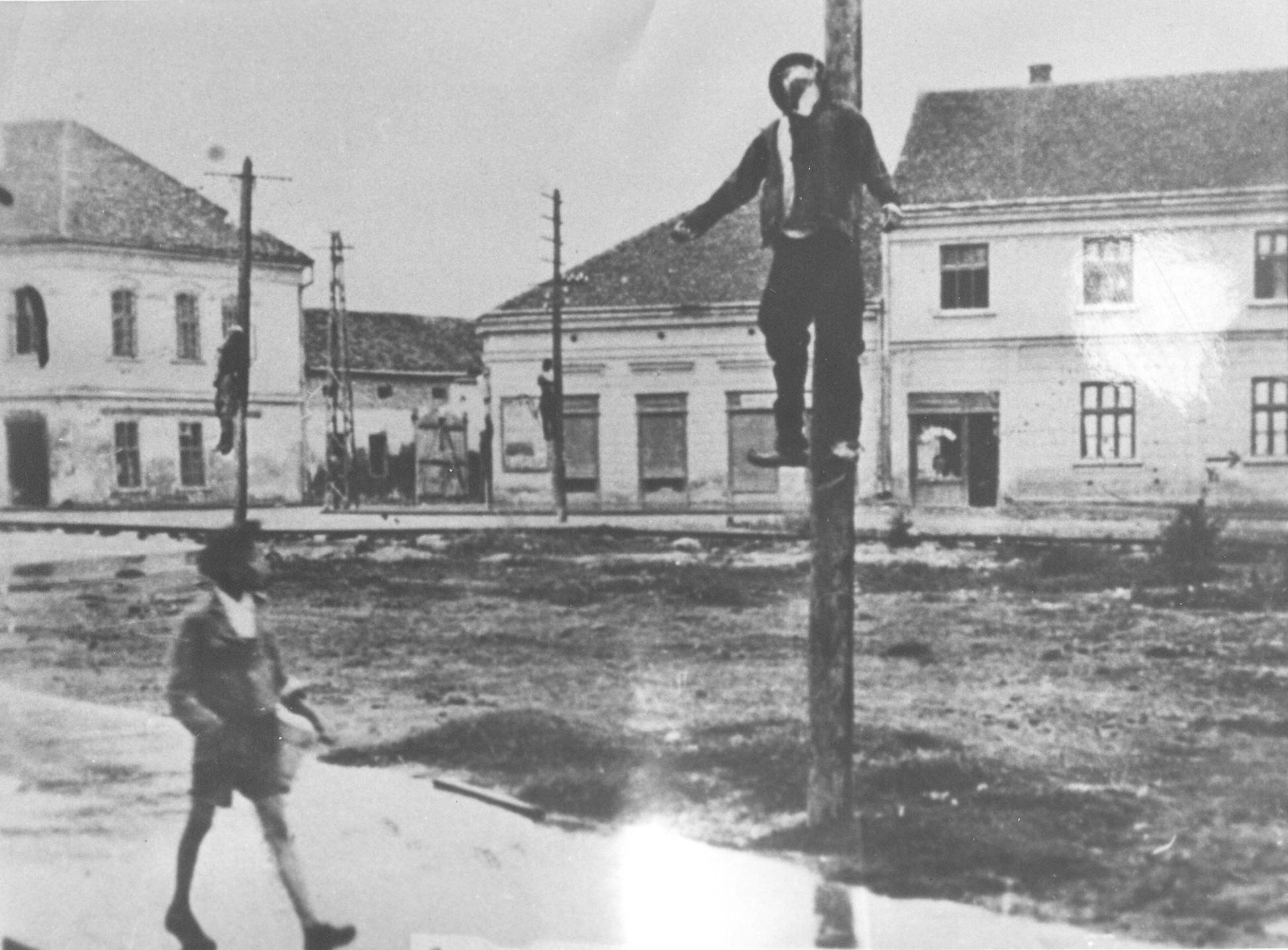
Hanged corpses of killed civilians in Šabac

The 342nd Infantry Division immediately targeted not only rebel armed units, but also civilian population. The 125th Infantry Regiment advanced from Belgrade through Obrenovac toward Ub and Valjevo. The 699th Infantry Regiment crossed Sava near Šabac during the night between 28 and 29 September while the 697th Infantry Regiment crossed Sava near Mačvanska Mitrovica. On 29 September the 699th and the 688th regiments advanced with broad frontline from Šabac toward Loznica while 697th regiment advanced from Mačvanska Mitrovica toward village Lipolist. Between Bogosavci and Dobrić the German forces were ambushed by group of Chetniks who retreated toward Dobrić when their commander was killed in this action and after the German forces received airplane support. On 30 September the Hungarian Danube river fleet destroyed villages Debrc and Novo Selo with artillery fire. When some rebel units tried to halt German advances near the cemetery in Majur "many Chetniks and Partisans died in battle with Germans".

The operation ended with failure. The main rebel forces and their headquarters retreated in front of German forces and avoided being captured or destroyed. On 7 October Böhme concluded that rebels escaped in front of the 342nd Infantry Division to Cer and south of it and issued an order to complete all preparations in the evening of 9 October to attack rebels on Cer and Iverak in dawn of 10 October 1941.

=== "Cer—Iverak" ===
On 10 October 1941 the Partisan pioneer unit retreated from Cer and arrived to Draginac and damaged the wooden bridge across river Jadar on 11 October. The rebel forces fortified on the hills near Draginac, the Pocerska company of the Podrinski Partisan detachment was positioned on the Sima's hill, while one company of the Cer Chetnik held positions on Mekote hill. One platoon of the Chetniks from Zavlaka held positions on Vis hill. On 11 October the German 342nd Infantry Division captured Tekeriš, Draginac, Loznica and Krst, burning monasteries Tronoša and Radovašnica later that day. On 12 October the rebels fortified their positions on the river Jadar, between iron bridge near Gajić's Rock and village Donja Batanja in Osečina. The additional supplies of arms and ammunition for rebel forces were produced in rebel-controlled Užice and delivered to Partisan and Račić's Chetnik units on the defensive line on the river Jadar. To reduce the pressure of German forces to Krupanj and Valjevo, the rebels attacked German positions on Zavlaka during the day and German camp in the village Draginac during the night. In Draginac there was a camp of the 698th Regiment of the 342nd Infantry Division, enforced with 10 tanks, artillery unit of 16 heavy guns, an engineering company and company for communications. According to Chetnik sources, Chetnik Captain Dragoslav Račić used German signal gun to give false signals to German artillery so they fired positions of German infantry units. The Chetnik sources emphasized that German forces suffered considerable loses from their own artillery before the confusion was resolved. The communist published sources also emphasize that rebel units composed of Partisans and Chetniks commanded by Račić defeated enemy attacking from direction of Draginac, Zavlaka and Tekeriš and forced them to retreat. On 15 October German units killed more than 3,000 civilians, including men, women and children. The German commander in Serbia reported on 16 October that 342nd Infantry Division regrouped its units south of mountain Cer, killed 635 people and arrested 1,043. The rebels received an order to destroy the wooden bridge on river Jadar, close to village Draginac in the night between 17 and 18 October 1941.

After heavy struggle, the German forces entered Krupanj on 20 October and Valjevo on 23 October 1941.

=== Casualties ===
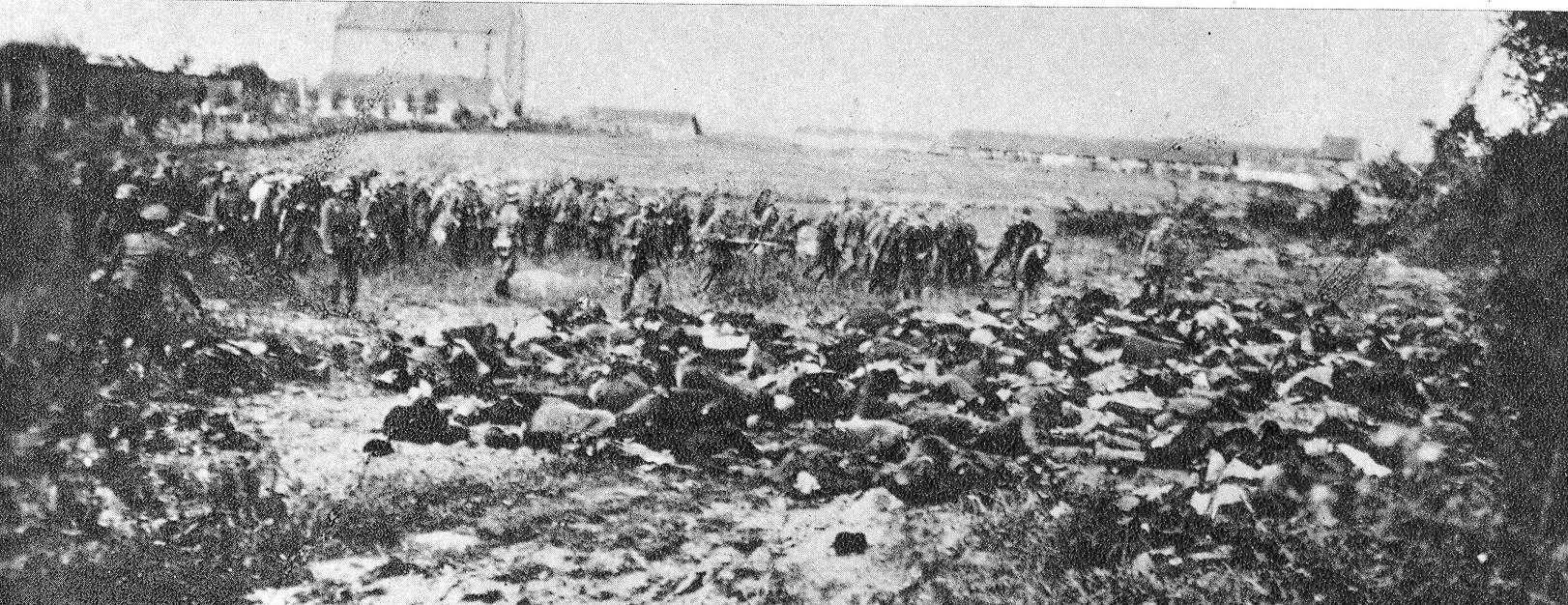
Mass murder of Serb civilians in Šabac 1941

According to German reports, 742 rebels were killed during the operation Cleaning Up the Sava Crescent. The total number of killed civilians in Mačva during this operation was about 6,000. Stanislav Krakov emphasized that German military reported that 342nd Infantry Division had 3 killed and 20 wounded during the release of Šabac and operation Cleaning Up the Sava Crescent.

== Aftermath ==
After operation "Cleaning up of Sava Crescent" the series of German military operations launched against the rebels included:

- "Krupanj – Jadar valley" in the period between 17 and 22 October 1941
- "Valjevo" in the period between 22 and 26 October 1941
- "Šabac and Tamnava" in the period between 3 and 9 November 1941
- "Zapadna Morava valley and region around Užice" in the period between 24 and 29 November 1941
- "Užice" until 4 December 1941

In Yugoslav post-war historiography the operation Cleaning Up the Sava Crescent was considered as the first phase of the First Enemy Offensive.

The operations of "Cleaning Up the Sava Crescent" had negative influence on the unifying rebels in Serbia with rebels in north-east Bosnia.

The uprising in Serbia failed to cause any serious casualties to Axis forces which had 200 killed and 400 wounded soldiers. The communist sources estimated that in the period between 24 September and 4 December 1941 the 342nd Infantry Division had 32 dead and about 130 wounded soldiers. The rebels had about 4,000 men killed during the fighting while 35,000 civilians were killed in Serbia as victims of German reprisals during 1941.

== Sources ==
- Pešić, Slavko (1989). Jugosloveni u nemačkim logorima u Grčkoj 1941–1944. ISI. ISBN 978-86-7403-024-0.
- Tito, Josip Broz (1961). Vojna djela: 1952-1961. Vojnoizdavački zavod JNA "Vojno delo,".
- Portmann, Michael (2008). Die kommunistische Revolution in der Vojvodina 1944–1952: Politik, Gesellschaft, Wirtschaft, Kultur. Verlag der Österreichischen Akademie der Wissenschaften. ISBN 978-3-7001-6503-3.
- Weiner, Hana; Ofer, Dalia (1996). Dead-end Journey: The Tragic Story of the Kladovo-Šabac Group. University Press of America. ISBN 978-0-7618-0199-3.
- Karchmar, Lucien (1973). Draz̆a Mihailović and the Rise of the C̆etnik Movement, 1941-1942. Department of History, Stanford University.
- Manoschek, Walter (2007). Holokaust u Srbiji: voijna okupaciona politika i uništavanje Jevreja, 1941–1942. Službeni list SRJ.
- Минић, Милош (1993). Ослободилачки или Грађански рат у Југославији 1941–1945. Агенција "Мир". ISBN 9788682295013.
- Morača, Pero (1971). Jugoslavija 1941. Institut za savremenu istoriju.
- Borković, Milan (1979). Kontrarevolucija u Srbiji: 1941–1942. Sloboda.
- Parmaković, Dragoslav (1973). Mačvanski (Podrinski) narodnooslobodilački partizanski odred, 1941–1944. Fond narodnooslobodilačke borbe Podrinja.
- Đurović, Milinko (1964). Ustanak naroda Jugolavije, 1941: zbornik. Pišu učesnici. Vojno delo.
- Marjanović, Jovan (1963). Ustanak i narodnocslobodilački pokret u Srbiji 1941.
- Pantelić, Milojica; Marinković, Radovan M.; Nikšić, Vladimir (1982). Čačanski narodnooslobodilački partizanski odred "Dr. Dragiša Mišović". Čačanski glas.
- Terzić, Velimir (1957). Oslobodilacki rat naroda Jugoslavije 1941–1945. Vojni istoriski Institut Jugoslovenske narodne armije.
- Latas, Branko; Dželebdžić, Milovan (1979). Četnički pokret Draže Mihailovića 1941–1945. Beogradski izdavačko-grafički zavod.
- Trbojević, Dušan (1998). Cersko-Majevička grupa korpusa, 1941–1945: pod komandom pukovnika Dragoslava S. Račića. D. Trbojević. ISBN 9780966856507.
- Miletić, Antun (1973). Užička republika. Eksport-pres.
- Jevtić, Aleksandar (1973). "BORBE VALJEVSKOG PARTIZANSKOG ODREDA U VREME UŽIČKE REPUBLIKE". Užička republika (in Serbian). Vol. 2. Eksport-pres.
- Marjanović, Jovan (1963b). Rising and the national liberation movement in Serbia in 1941. Verlag nicht ermittelbar.
- Krakov, Stanislav (1963). General Milan Nedić. Iskra.
- Цвејић, Небојша (2006). "КОД 21ЧАСОПИС ЗА КУЛТУРУ И УМЕТНОСТ". Kod 21: Časopis za Kulturu i Umetnost. Шабачко позориште. ISSN 2466-3212.
- Morača, Pero (1957). Prelomna godina Narodnooslobodilačkog rata: Narodnooslobodilački pokret krajem 1941 i početkom 1942, pohod proleterskih brigada u Zapadnu Bosnu, Bihaćka operacija, stvaranje NOVJ i I zasjedanje AVNOJ-a. Vojnoizdavački zavod JNA.
