= Franjo Šimić =

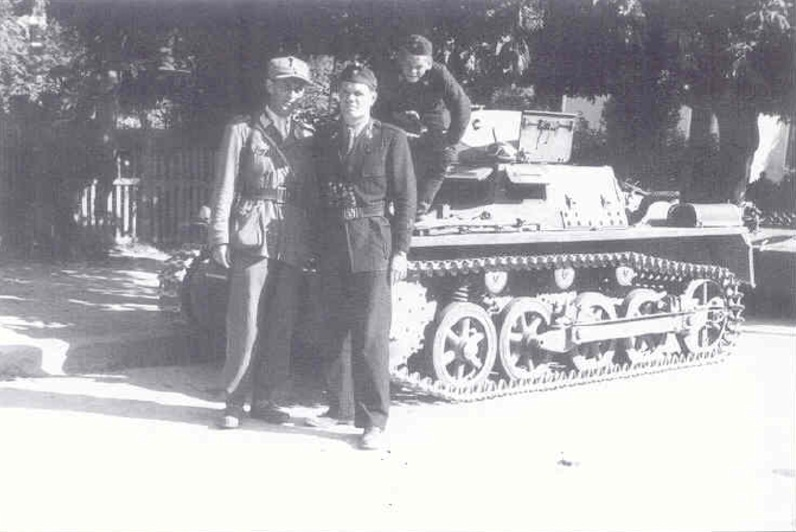
- Colonel Šimić and Major Rafael Boban during the Battle of Kupres.
- Born: 25 May 1900; Gospić, Austria-Hungary
- Died: 9 August 1944 (aged 44); Mostar, Independent State of Croatia
- Education: Military Academy in Belgrade
- Military career
- Allegiance: Yugoslavia (1920–1941); Independent State of Croatia (1941–1944)
- Branch: Croatian Home Guard
- Rank: General
- Conflicts: World War II †; Eastern Herzegovina Uprising; Battle of Kupres

Franjo Šimić (25 May 1900 – 9 August 1944) was a Croatian colonel, and later general, in the Croatian Home Guard.

== Education and early career ==
Franjo Šimić was born on 25 May 1900 in Gospić, a town in Kingdom of Croatia-Slavonia, a part of the Austro-Hungarian Empire. He finished compulsory education in his hometown, after which he enrolled in a lower military Realschule in Strass and after that in a higher military Realschule in Maribor. He completed a year in the Military Academy of Wiener Neustadt and another year in a military academy in Karlovac. After the dissolution of Austria-Hungary, he enrolled in the Military Academy of Belgrade in the newly-formed Yugoslavia. He completed it in the May 1920 and gained the rank of a podporučnik. (Note: Equivalent to a U.S. Army second lieutenant.)

Šimić commanded a platoon in the 19th Infantry Regiment stationed in Kragujevac from 3 March to 24 December. After that, until 5 April 1924, he commanded a platoon in an infantry regiment of the King's Guard. He was promoted to poručnik (Note: Equivalent to a U.S. Army first lieutenant.) on 17 December 1922. From April to November 1924, he attended an infantry officer school in Kalinovik near Sarajevo. Šimić returned to the infantry regiment of King's Guard, this time serving as a commander of a company until 18 March 1930 and while in that position he rose to the rank of kapetan. (Note: Equivalent to a U.S. Army captain.) Between 1930 and 1932, he served in the Royal Palace as a Queen Maria of Yugoslavia's adjutant. Afterwards, he enrolled in a higher school of the Military Academy, which he completed in 1924, and during this education, he was promoted to the rank of major. He commanded several different battalions in 1938 and 1939 and in 1940 he was promoted to pukovnik. (Note: Equivalent to a U.S. Army colonel.)

== World War II ==
=== April war and counterinsurgency in Herzegovina ===
On 6 April 1941, Axis powers invaded Yugoslavia, at that time Šimić was commander of a VI subsection of the border troops. A day later, he was assigned commander of the 333rd Reserve Infantry Regiment. On 18 April, Yugoslavia surrendered and it was occupied and dismembered Yugoslavia, with several nations annexing parts of its territory and a puppet state called the Independent State of Croatia (Nezavisna Država Hrvatska, NDH) being established. Šimić joined Home Guard branch of the armed forces of the NDH on 14 May 1941.

On 5 July 1941, Šimić was assigned a force consisting of the 6th, 11th, 15th, and 17th Battalions, a company of the 18th Battalion and a troop of artillery to put down an uprising in the eastern Herzegovina. The force numbered 62 officers and 2,062 men, with heavy weapons including four 100 mm Skoda houfnice vz 14 mountain howitzers, six heavy machine guns and twenty-seven light machine guns. Šimić seized the crossroads near Kifino Selo and Plužine, securing it with one company of the 11th Battalion, then sent the 15th Battalion to Gacko and the 17th Battalion to Berkovići. On 6 July, Šimić issued an order in which he established rules of behavior and "most strongly forbid terror, violence, pillaging and any mess". He also ordered the armed forces to prevent terror by the locals. Operations by Šimić's force proceeded without significant fighting and by 7 July, NDH forces had full control of eastern Herzegovina.

Šimić became a commander of the Home Guard Nevesinje Brigade which conducted counterinsurgency operations in eastern Herzegovina against a new uprising that begun in mid-August 1941. On 19 November 1941, he was appointed commander of 9th Infantry Regiment, which also operated in Herzegovina. On 23 March 1942, Šimić was appointed commander of the newly-formed 2nd Mountain Brigade, stationed in Bjelovar. Poglavnik of the NDH Ante Pavelić appointed Šimić an operational commander of all armed units of the NDH in great parishes of Pliva-Rama and Lašva-Glaž on 27 May 1942, as rebel activity had increased following Italian withdrawal from these areas earlier that month.

=== Battles during the Partisan Long March ===
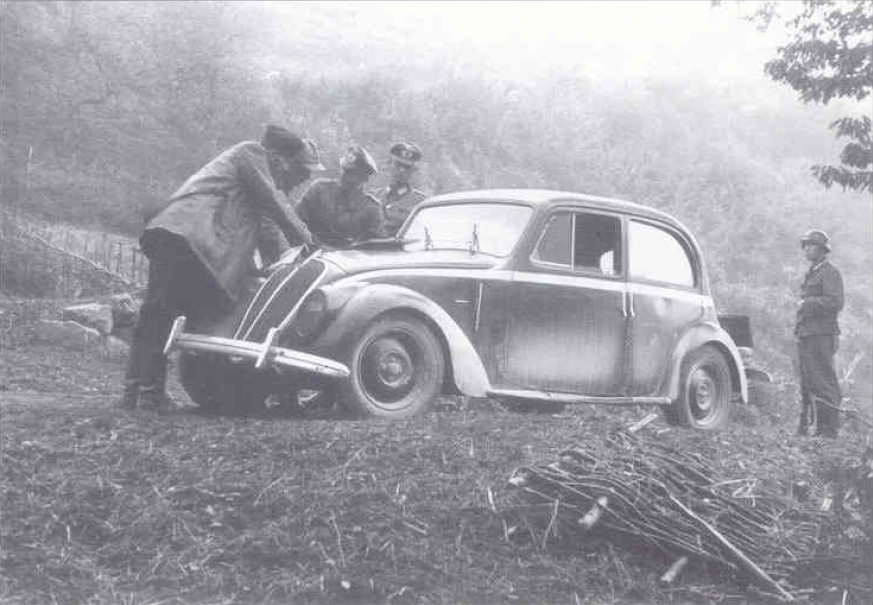
Jure Francetić, Franjo Šimić, and German officers inspecting a map during July 1942

In early July 1942, Šimić arrived in Bugojno to organize defences in that area where an attack by Yugoslav Partisans was expected. A partisan 2nd Proletarian Brigade was spotted from Bugojno in the morning of 13 July and the Šimić's forces opened artillery fire on the brigade, killing one partisan. Šimić ordered a company to pursue the Partisans, the company was unsuccessful but it captured a Partisan runner who gave information about the strength of the brigade. In the following days, Šimić threatened the county prefect in Prozor, saying that he will be executed "for spreading alarming news". After that, Šimić ordered arrests of the county prefect in Bugojno and several civilians because of suspicion that they collaborated with the Partisans. He also threatened civilian officials in Kupres and Donji Vakuf.

At around 22:00 on 16 July, the Partisans attacked Bugojno. Both sides suffered heavy losses during the battle and the Partisans retreated on the next day. On 20 July, Šimić together with Colonel Jure Francetić re-captured Bugojno-Donji Vakuf road from the Partisans. During the night of 20/21 July, the Partisans attacked Bugojno for the second time and again failed to capture it. In next several days, Šimić led a successful anti-partisan operation in the valley of Vrbas river near Bugojno.

Šimić retook Šuica and Tomislavgrad in August 1942. He was awarded the Military Order of the Iron Trefoil III Class in late 1942 for his role in the defense of Kupres and Bugojno. He was allegedly assassinated in Mostar in 1944 and posthumously awarded the Military Order of the Iron Trefoil II with Wreath, which gave him the title of vitez (knight).
