= Battle of Kupres (1942) =

1942 battle during World War II

- Part of World War II in Yugoslavia
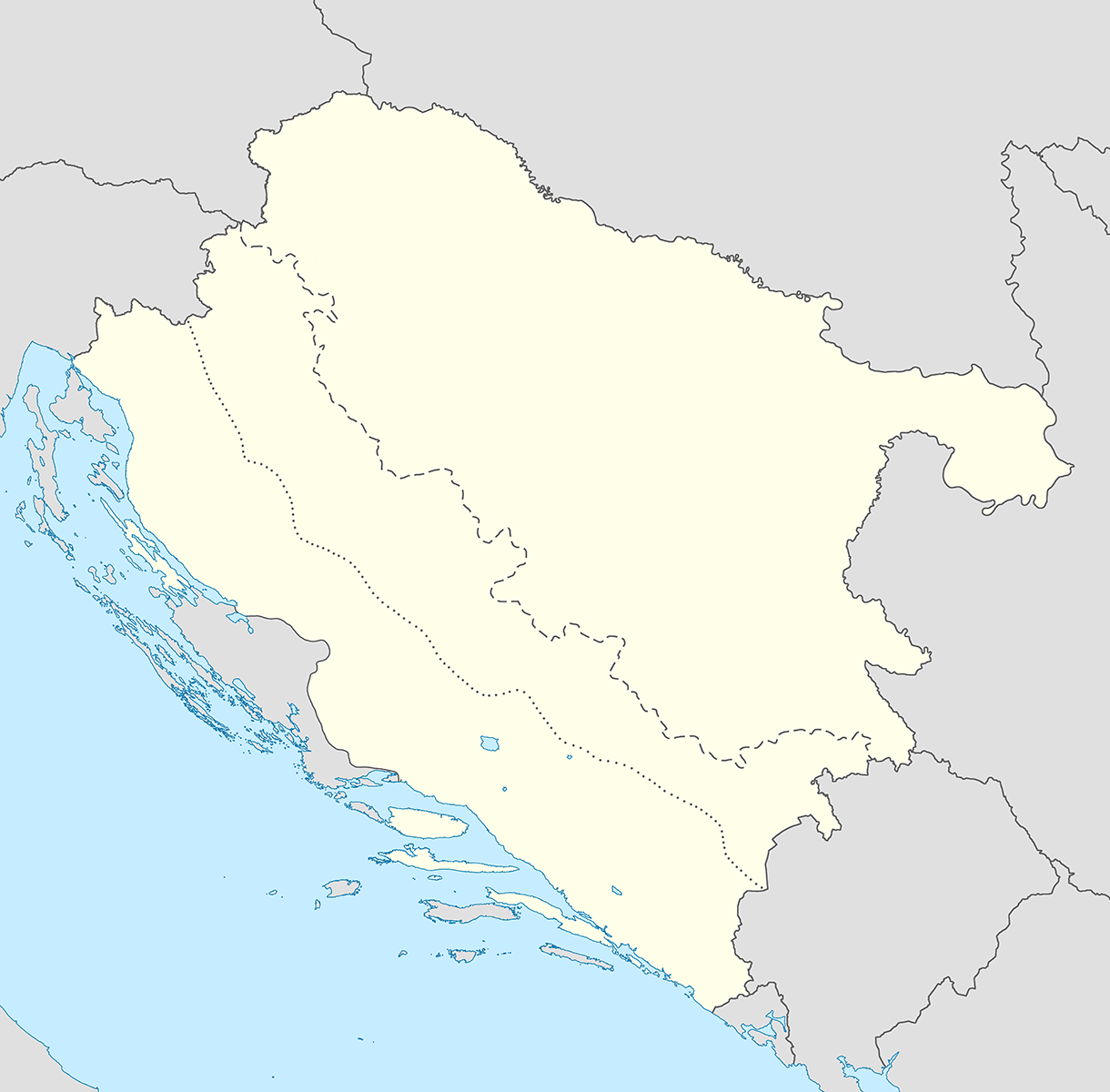
- Kupres (NDH) Kupres (Bosnia and Herzegovina)
Date	28 July – 19 August 1942
Location	Kupres, Independent State of Croatia (modern-day Bosnia and Herzegovina)
Result	Independent State of Croatia victory: Partisan failure to capture the town

Belligerents
Axis: Independent State of Croatia	Allies: (Democratic Federal Yugoslavia) Partisans

Commanders and leaders
(Independent State of Croatia) Franjo Šimić (Independent State of Croatia) Rafael Boban	(Democratic Federal Yugoslavia) Sreten Žujović

Units involved
Ustaše Militia: Black Legion (c. 600 men); Croatian Home Guard; Kupres Militia	2nd Proletarian brigade 3rd Proletarian; 4th Proletarian brigade 10th Herzegovinian Brigade; 1st Krajina Brigade; 3rd Krajina NOP Detachment

Strength
1,400–1,500	2,100–3,000

The Battle of Kupres (Croatian: Bitka za Kupres) was fought in 1942 during World War II in the Independent State of Croatia, between the forces of the Independent State of Croatia and the Yugoslav Partisans, in and around the town of Kupres in western Bosnia. The Partisans launched three concentrated attacks against the garrison of 1,500 men during the nights of 11/12 August, 14 August, and 19 August. Although outnumbered, the Black Legion, Croatian Home Guard, and local militia units successfully defended the town against several Partisan brigades.

== Background ==
In July 1942, the 2nd Proletarian Brigade moved on Kupres and, with the assistance of local Partisans, seized control over several villages in the vicinity. During the night of 4 August 1942 the Partisans attacked the town of Livno and captured it in the following days. The plan of the National Liberation Army Supreme Command, following the seizure of Livno, was to move the Proletarian Assault Brigades to Kupres, whose capture was vital for further actions in the valley of River Vrbas.

== The battle ==
(Democratic Federal Yugoslavia) Yugoslav Partisans 11/12 August 1942, 13 battalions with around 2,100 men

- 2nd Proletarian Brigade
- 3rd Proletarian (Sandžak) Brigade
- 4th Proletarian (Montenegrin) Brigade
- 10th Herzegovinian Brigade
- 3rd Krajina NOP Detachment

14 August 1942, 16 battalions with around 2,400 - 3,000 men

- 2nd Proletarian Brigade
- 3rd Proletarian (Sandžak) Brigade
- 4th Proletarian (Montenegrin) Brigade
- 10th Herzegovinian Brigade
- 1st Krajina Brigade
- 3rd Krajina NOP Detachment

Independent State of Croatia 11/12 August 1942, in total around 1,400 men

- Black Legion
- Kupres Militia
- XVII Ustaša Battalion
- 9th Artillery Battalion
- 9th Infantry Regiment
- 5th Gendarmerie Regiment

14 August 1942, around 1,500 armed men

- Black Legion
- Kupres Militia
- XVII Ustaša Battalion
- 9th Artillery Battalion
- 9th Infantry Regiment
- 5th Gendarmerie Regiment
- 14th Infantry Regiment
