= Attack on Šabac =

- Part of the Uprising in Serbia during World War II in Yugoslavia
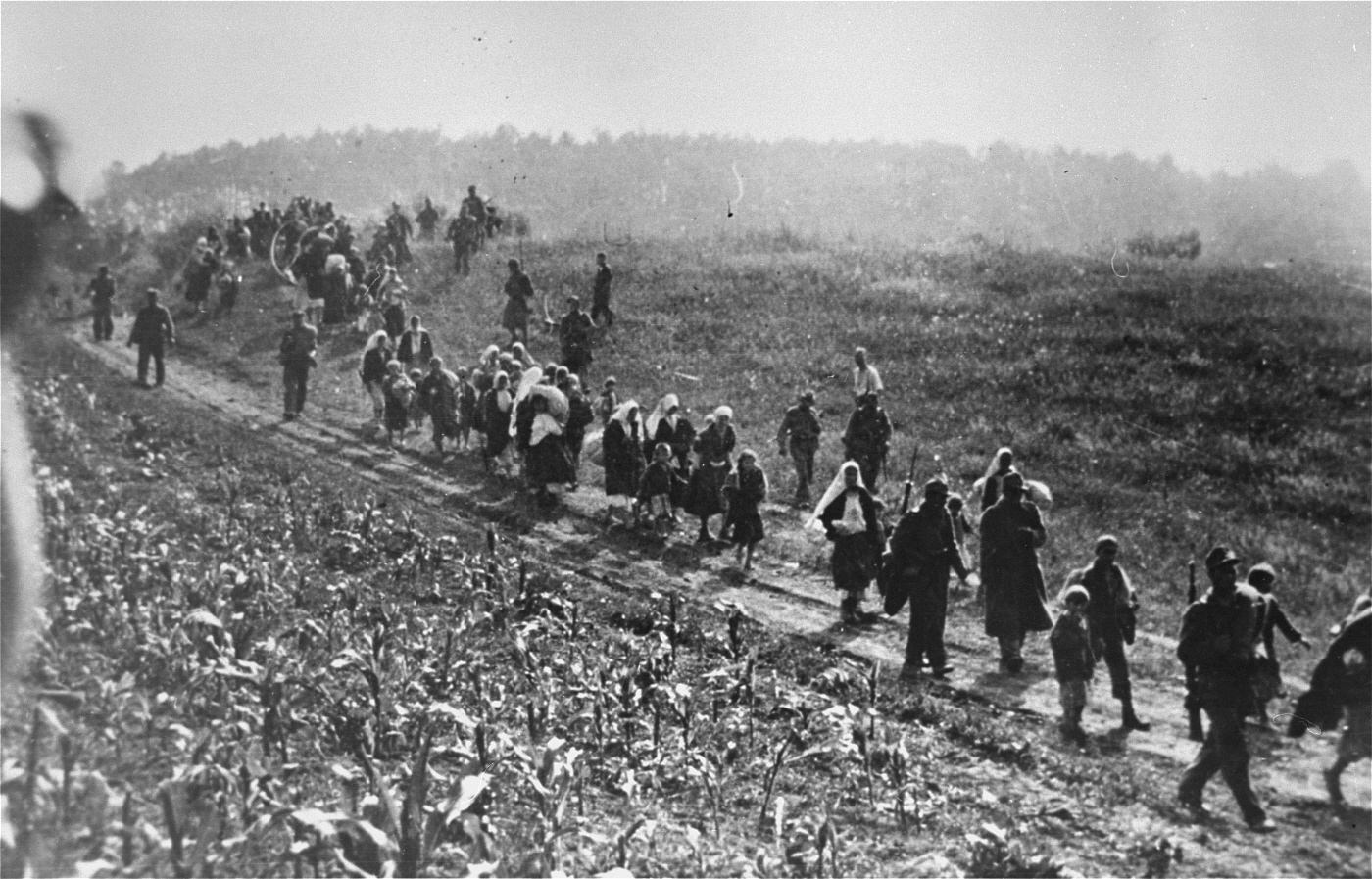
- German soldiers, aided by Ustaše lead a column of Serb civilians to the Šabac internment camp
Date	21–26 September 1941
Location	Šabac, Territory of the Military Commander in Serbia (now in Serbia)
Result	Defeat of rebel forces, massive reprisals against civilians

Belligerents
Chetniks Communist Party of Yugoslavia	(Nazi Germany) Germany; Independent State of Croatia

Commanders and leaders
(Chetniks) Dragoslav Račić; Bogdan Ilić – Cerski; Nebojša Jerković	(Nazi Germany) Franz Böhme (Nazi Germany) Walter Hinghofer (Independent State of Croatia) Unknown

Units involved
(Chetniks) Chetniks Cer Detachment companies: (Chetniks) Čokešina; (Chetniks) Mačva; (Chetniks) Machine gun; (Chetniks) Prnjavor; (Chetniks) Martinović-Zečević unit; Pećanac Chetniks: Partisans Detachments; Mačvanski or Podrinski NOP Detachment; Posavski; Valjevski	(Nazi Germany) Wehrmacht; 704th Division; 3rd battalion of the 724th Infantry regiment; 718th Division; 5th company of 750th regiment; 342nd Infantry Division; (Independent State of Croatia) Ustaše unidentified unit

Strength
1,500 Military Chetniks; 500 Chetniks of Kosta Pećanac; 1,100 Partisans	Unknown

Casualties and losses
Unknown heavy casualties of rebels; Civilians: 1,130 executed; 21,500 imprisoned; most of the populated places in Mačva completely burned	Unknown small casualties

The attack on Šabac was attack of the united rebel forces of the Chetniks, forces of the Communist Party of Yugoslavia and Pećanac Chetniks against German forces garrisoned in Šabac in Axis-occupied Yugoslavia (modern-day Serbia) in period between 21 and 26 September 1941, during the Uprising in Serbia.

The commander of all forces was Chetnik Captain Dragoslav Račić, commander of the Chetnik Cer Detachment composed of five companies with about 1,500 soldiers. Račić participated in the battle contrary to instructions of his superior commander Draža Mihailović who refused to allow Chetniks to attack much stronger and well prepared German garrison in Šabac. The Partisan forces of the communist party composed of three detachments with about 1,100 soldiers were commanded by Nebojša Jerković while forces of 500 Pećanac Chetniks were commanded by Bogdan Ilić – Cerski.

The Axis forces were under supreme command of General Franz Böhme. The Šabac garrison initially had one battalion and one company from 704th and 718th Division reinforced by the 342nd Infantry Division and unidentified unit of Croatian Ustaše. The Axis garrison in Šabac was aware of rebel plans for attack and was well prepared for defence.

The attack began during the night on 22 September and lasted until 26 September, with rebels repeated attacks during the night and retreating in the dawn without being able to defeat the German garrison. There are indications that Partisans retreated on 24 September. The rebels failed to capture Šabac and retreated from the region of Mačva until the end of September in front of advancing Axis forces. The casualties of the rebels are unknown, but the German and Croatian retributions were devastating, with 1,130 executed civilians, 21,500 imprisoned and most of the populated places in Mačva completely burned down. Eventually, at the end of World War II in Yugoslavia, the communist led Partisan forces captured Šabac in autumn 1944, killed at least 177 people from Šabac in communist purges and established the communist regime which lasted for almost fifty years.

== Background ==
=== Emergence of two resistance movements ===
During the Axis invasion of Yugoslavia the German forces occupied Šabac on 13 April 1941. Draža Mihailović and group of Yugoslav officers gathered on Ravna Gora in May 1941 and marked the beginning of the establishment of Chetnik detachments of Yugoslav Army as the earliest organized resistance movement in Axis occupied Yugoslavia. The Yugoslav Communists decided to start with armed resistance on 4 July 1941, three days after they received an order from the Comintern and a day after Stalin issued his order on 3 July 1941.

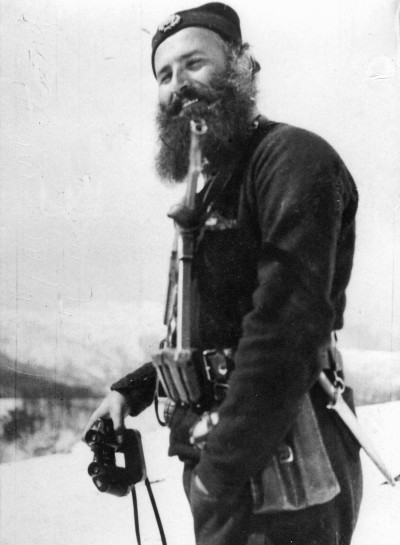
Dragoslav Račić, the commander of all rebel units during the attack on Šabac

=== Preparations for joint attack of both resistance units ===
On 25 August Račić and Jerković composed and sent a letter to Draža Mihailović asking for his approval for joint action of Chetniks and Partisans against the Axis forces, emphasizing that there is atmosphere of population of the region for united struggle against the occupiers. Mihailović did not approve the attack on Šabac since rebel forces were still weak and because the German garrison was well prepared for the attack, emphasizing that it is irrational to capture Šabac without being able to capture the territory on the left bank of river Sava. Nevertheless, on 28 August Račić and Jerković agreed to attack Šabac together with Račić being the main commander of all units. On 1 September the Chetnik Cer Detachment and Partisan Podrinje Detachment issued a joint proclamation emphasizing their intention to struggle against the occupying forces together.

== Forces ==
=== Rebel forces ===
The rebel forces were composed of three different factions:

- Yugoslav Army in the Fatherland forces
- Communist controlled Partisan forces
- Chetniks of Kosta Pećanac

Račić was commander of all forces attacking Šabac, the Chetniks, the Partisans and detachment of Pećanac Chetniks commanded by Budimir Ilić – Cerski. The deputy commander was Nebojša Jerković while political commessair was Danilo Lekić Španac. The Chetnik forces had about 1,500 soldiers while the communist Partisan forces had about 1,000 soldiers, while Pećanac Chetniks commanded by Cerski had about 500 men. Two units of the Serbian State Guard were dispatched by General Milan Nedić to break the siege of Šabac but Račić and Jerković convinced them to join the rebels.

The forces of the Yugoslav Army in the Fatherland consisted of Cer Detachment commanded by Račić, and composed of the following companies:

- Cer company commanded by the Lieutenant Ratko Teodosijević
- Čokešina company
- Mačva company commanded by Lieutenant Nikola Sokić
- Machine gun company commanded by Lieutenant Voja Tufegdžić
- Prnjavor company
- Martinović-Zečević unit commanded by Vlada Zečević and Ratko Martinović

The communist forces were composed of the following NOP Detachments: Podrinjski (or Mačvanski), Posavski and Valjevski.

=== Axis forces ===
The Axis forces in Šabac had 3rd battalion of the 724th Infantry regiment of 704th Division and 5th company of 750th regiment of 718th Division.

== Battle ==
=== Besieging Šabac ===
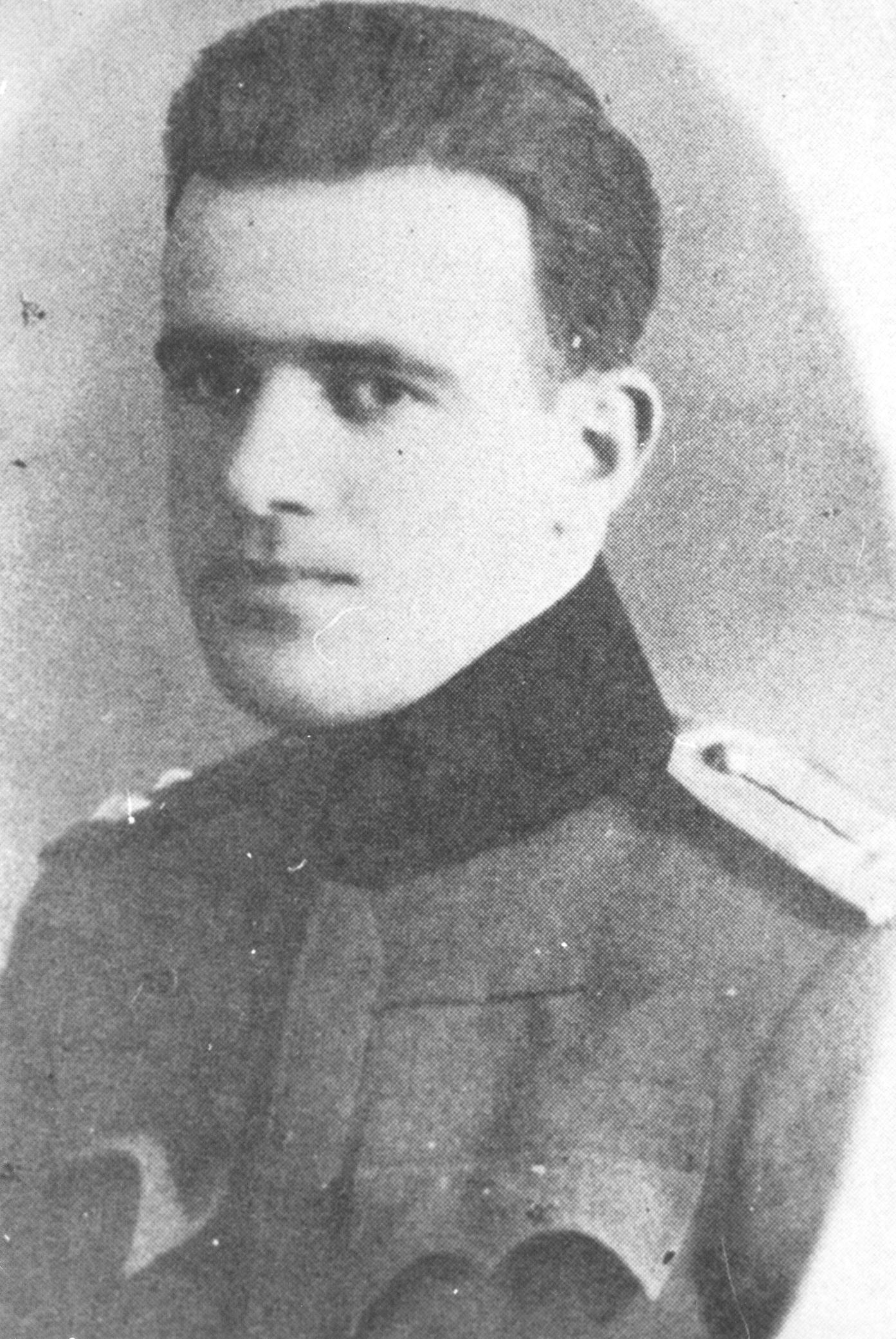
Veselin Misita, commander of Chetnik Jadar Detachment who led the capture of Loznica on 31 August 1941

The joint Chetnik and Partisan forces in other parts of the region of Mačva started their cooperation and scored several important victories against the Axis forces. In the Battle of Loznica waged on 30 August 1941, the rebels commanded by Chetnik commander Veselin Misita captured Loznica from Axis forces. On 3 September 1941 the rebels captured Bogatić from Axis occupying forces with both resistance groups claiming credits for this capture. After the Capture of Banja Koviljača by the rebel forces on 6 September 1941, most of the region around Šabac was under rebel control and the town was almost completely blocked by the rebel forces.

=== Preparation of German forces ===
To avoid surrender, the German garrisons in Užice and Požega were retreated from these towns swiftly captured by Chetniks right after the German retreat.

On the other hand, already besieged German garrison in Šabac organized extensive preparations for rebel attack, including cutting all corn fields and woods around the town, securing their command buildings, preparation of the shelters made of bags with sand, erecting barbwire barricades and securing the entrances to the city. The German forces even destroyed some houses which they thought could serve as barricade for attacking rebels.

=== Attack on Šabac ===
The exact date for rebel attack on Šabac was delayed two times, it was first set for 10 September and then for 17 September, and the rebel leaders agreed on their meeting in Štitar held on 19 September 1941 to set the final date for attack on Šabac to be 21 September. That was the same day when the popular Šabac Fair was traditionally organized on the day of Orthodox religious holiday of the Nativity of Mary.

On 21 September 1941 the rebels commanded by Dragoslav Račić attacked Šabac. The artillery fire from Beća's hill in 11pm signaled the beginning of the rebel attack. The rebels planned to cut the German garrison from their retreat route across the bridge on river Sava and capture them all in Šabac.

During the night the fighting took place on the periferry of the Šabac, while only small group of rebels managed to enter the city center, but could not hold it and retreated early in the morning of 22 September together with all other rebel units. The rebels did not repeat their attacks during the day on 22 September. During the night, on 22 September the rebels again attacked Šabac, again in 11pm, almost exactly the same way like the night before. The Partisans attacked toward central part of the town known as Kamičak, while Chetniks attacked from army barracks and cemetery near bridge. Although significant parts of the town was captured by the rebels, they failed to defeat German garrison until the dawn when they again retreated, again without repeating the attack during the day on 23 September. Further plans for attack were halted after the arrival of the German 342nd Infantry Division when joint command decided to cancel further attacks and prepare for the defence in their positions. The 342nd Infantry Division, under command of Generalleutnant (Major General) Dr. Walter Hinghofer, entered Šabac on 23 September. According to some indications, the Partisans retreated from Šabac on 24 September 1941 while Račić and his Chetniks continued with the battle until 26 September 1941.

== Retribution and Axis recapture of Mačva ==
In the night between 23 and 24 September General Franz Böhme ordered capture of all male population of Šabac of age between 14 and 70 to be imprisoned in the concentration camp north of river Sava. On the same night the units of German army and smaller number of Ustaše forces arrived to Šabac to help to execute this order and to clean the region of Mačva from rebel forces. Until the end of September all territory of Mačva was again captured by Axis forces with final balance of 1,130 executed and 21,500 imprisoned civilians, while most of populated places were burned.

On 4 October 1941 there was the first "peaceful contact" between rebels in Serbia and German occupying forces when Captain Račić sent a letter to the commander of the Company of German Infantry Regiment in Šabac.

== Aftermath ==
At the end of September and beginning of October, the significant part of the territory of Serbia was under rebel control. It encompassed almost all territory of Western Serbia except German garrisons in Šabac, Valjevo and Kraljevo. About one million people lived on the rebel-controlled territory where both resistance movements organized a separate mobilization of the armed units. The German command in Serbia under Franz Böhme employed additional forces and organized Operation "Cleansing of the Sava region" which started on 24 September 1941. Until the end of October recaptured all major populated places in this region were reoccupied by the German forces. Because the communist forces began with the second phase of the communist revolution on the territories they controlled (so-called Leftist errors), they antagonized both Chetniks and the local population as well, and were forced to almost completely leave Serbia until the end of 1941. When the conflict between Chetniks and communist-led Partisans began, Vlada Zečević and Ratko Martinović with most of their Chetniks defected to Partisans.

At the end of World War II, the German army strategically retreated in front of the advancing Soviet Red Army which allowed Yugoslav communist forces to take control over Axis occupied Serbia, including Šabac in Autumn 1944. The Yugoslav communist established their regime in Šabac and the rest of Yugoslavia which lasted for almost fifty years. After the regime of communists in Serbia ended, the Government of Serbia and its Ministry of Justice established the commission to research atrocities that were committed by members of the Yugoslav Partisan Movement after they gained control over Serbia in Autumn 1944. According to the report of this commission, out of 55,554 registered victims of communist purges in Serbia, the new communist regime in Šabac killed 177 people while 8 people are missing.

== Legacy ==
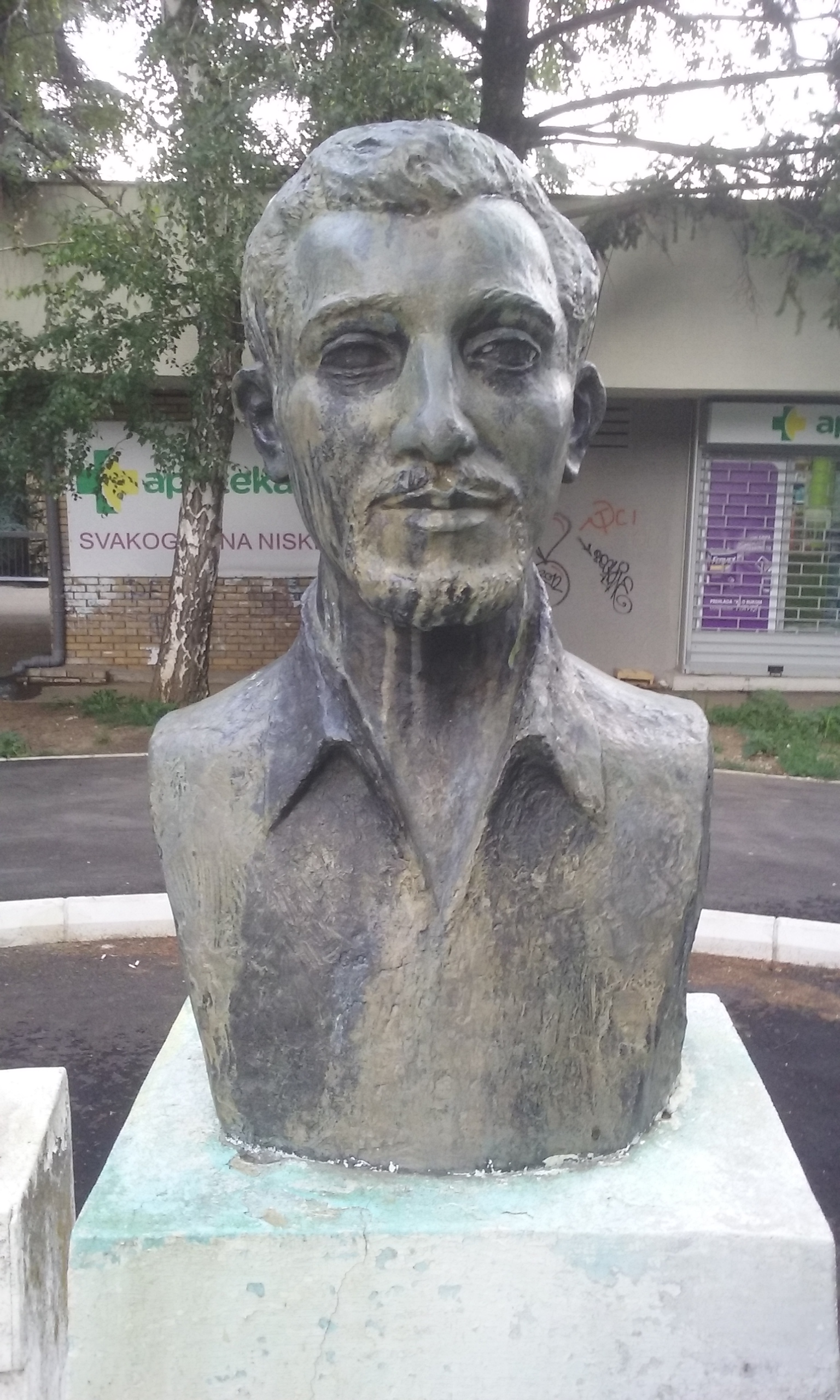
Monument to Nebojša Jerković in Belgrade

The post-war communist regime emphasized the role of the communist forces, ignoring the resistance actions of Chetniks during the battle for Šabac. The monument to Nebojša Jerković was erected in Belgrade while the whole part of the city was named against Nebojša and his brother Dušan (urban neighborhood Braće Jerković) who both died in battle against Axis in 1941, Nebojša in December 1941 near Šabac and Dušan in November 1941 near Užice.

== Sources ==
- Banac, Ivo (1988). With Stalin Against Tito: Cominformist Splits in Yugoslav Communism. Cornell University Press. ISBN 0-8014-2186-1.
- Jončić, Koča (1985). Narodni ustanak i borbe za Kraljevo 1941. godine: zbornik radova naučnog skupa. Narodna knj. ISBN 9788633100014.
- Kazimirović, Vasa (1995). Srbija i Jugoslavija: 1914–1945. Prizma. ISBN 9788670840010.
- Dedijer, Vladimir (1990). From April 6, 1941, to November 27, 1942. University of Michigan Press. ISBN 978-0-472-10091-0.
- Dimitrijević, Bojan (2014). Vojska Nedićeve Srbije: oružan snage Srpske vlade 1941–1945. Službeni glasnik.
- Цвејић, Небојша (2006). "КОД 21ЧАСОПИС ЗА КУЛТУРУ И УМЕТНОСТ". Kod 21: Časopis za Kulturu i Umetnost. Шабачко позориште. ISSN 2466-3212.
- Karchmar, Lucien (1973). Draz̆a Mihailović and the Rise of the C̆etnik Movement, 1941–1942. Department of History, Stanford University.
- Marjanović, Jovan (1963). Ustanak i narodnocslobodilački pokret u Srbiji 1941. Institut društvenih nauka. Odeljenje za istoriske nauke.
- Browning, Christopher R. (1 May 2007). The Origins of the Final Solution: The Evolution of Nazi Jewish Policy, September 1939-March 1942. U of Nebraska Press. ISBN 978-0-8032-0392-1.
