= Branimir Altgayer =

SS officer during World War II (1897-1950)

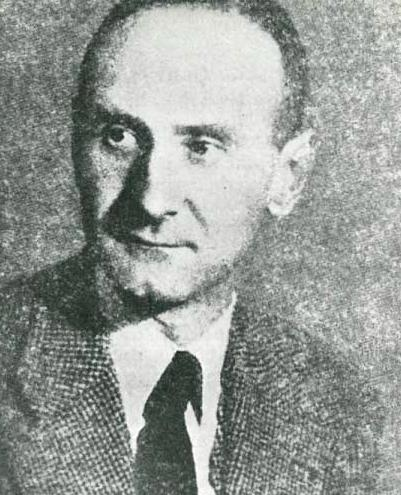
Branimir Altgayer

Branimir Altgayer (born either 8 November 1897 in Przekopane, Galicia; or 8 December 1897 in Kutjevo, Slavonia – died 15 May 1950 (or 15 May 1951) in Zagreb) was a German minority leader in the Kingdom of Yugoslavia and the Independent State of Croatia, and an SS officer in World War II.

== Life ==
According to postwar interrogations Altgayer was born in Galicia, where his father, a native of Osijek, served as an Austro-Hungarian army cavalry officer. Altgayer grew up in various garrison towns, including Pardubice, Čakovec and Sarajevo. In 1904 his family moved to Kutjevo in Slavonia, where he attended school. He then attended schools in Osijek and Zemun, where he obtained his high school diploma.

He attended the Cavalry Cadet School in Moravia between 1912 and 1915, and then fought during World War I as an officer in the Austro-Hungarian army in Russia, Romania and Italy. On 24 August 1915 he was appointed as a Leutnant (lieutenant) and on 17 August 1917 promoted to Oberleutnant (senior lieutenant). Between 16 December 1918 and 28 January 1927, Altgayer served in the army of the Kingdom of Serbs, Croats and Slovenes, where he reached the rank of Captain First Class. After leaving the army he worked as a bookkeeper, bank clerk, representative and head of an agricultural cooperative. After 1937 he became involved in Volksdeutsche (ethnic German minority) communal politics.

Branimir Altgayer took a lead in the Schwäbisch-Deutschen Kulturbund Jugoslawiens (Swabian-German Cultural Association of Yugoslavia). In 1936 he founded in Osijek the Kultur- und Wohlfahrtsvereinigung der Deutschen (KWVD/Cultural and Welfare Association of Germans). After the pro-Nazi takeover of the German minority political realm in 1939, he was appointed regional head of Slavonia.

After the founding of the Ustaše-led Independent State of Croatia (NDH) Altgayer was not initially selected by the Nazis to lead the German minority in the NDH. Rather, power went to Josef Meier who followed guidance from the Volksdeutsche Mittelstelle (VoMi) in Berlin more closely. Altgayer quickly "became a chronic source of trouble for VoMi. Due to his popularity with the NDH authorities as well as his German constituents, Altgayer increasingly disregarded VoMi's instructions, especially when he believed that Reich demands conflicted with the best interests of his Volksdeutsche."

On 6 November 1941 Heinrich Himmler appointed Altagayer an SS-Hauptsturmführer and on 9 November 1943 he was promoted to SS-Sturmbannführer. In 1942, Altgayer was selected as one of two representatives of the German minority in Sabor. In 1943 he was named as secretary to the Ustaše government and responsible for the internal affairs of the German minority. The leader of the NDH, Ante Pavelić, also appointed Altgayer as a reserve colonel in the Ustaše Militia and he was also bestowed with the title "Knight" (vitez). He served briefly on the German Eastern Front.

== Postwar ==
After World War II, Altgayer escaped to Austria but was delivered by the British occupying power with others, against an extradition request, from Wolfsberg internment camp to Communist Yugoslavia. He was sentenced in the district court of Zagreb on 21 January 1950 for "crimes against the people and state" sentenced to death. He filed a petition for mercy in vain and, officially at least, he was executed by firing squad on 15 May, either 1950 or 1951, aged either 52 or 53.

== See also ==
- Einsatzstaffel (Independent State of Croatia)

== Literature ==
- Vladimir Geiger, Saslušanje Branimira Altgayera vođe Njemacke narodne skupine u Nezavisnoj Državi Hrvatskoj u Upravi državne bezbjednosti za Narodnu Republiku Hrvatsku 1949. godine [Die Vernehmung von Branimir Altgayer, dem Führer der Deutschen Volksgruppe im NDH im Staatssicherheitsdienst der Volksrepublik Kroatien 1949]. Časopis za suvremenu povijest, (Zagreb, 1999) 31, pp. 575-638.
- Mads Ole Balling, Von Reval bis Bukarest - Statistisch-Biographisches Handbuch der Parlamentarier der deutschen Minderheiten in Ostmittel und Südosteuropa 1919-1945, Band 2, 2. Auflage. (Kopenhagen 1991), ISBN 87-983829-5-0, pp. 687-688.
- Anton Scherer, Suevia-Pannonica, (Graz 2009)
- Valdis O. Lumans, Himmler's Auxiliaries, The Volksdeutsche Mittelstelle and the German Minorities of Europe, 1939-1945 (1993)
