= Black Legion (Ustaše militia) =

1st Standing Active Brigade
- Prvi stajaći djelatni sdrug (Croatian)
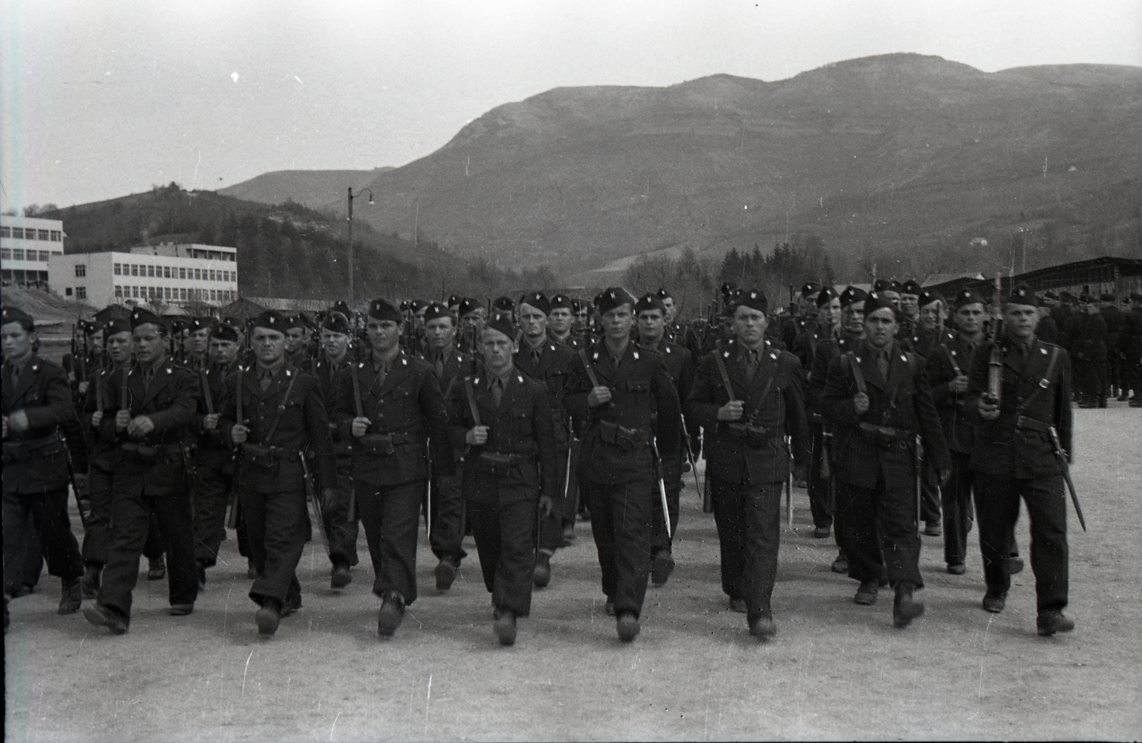
- Soldiers of the Black Legion in Sarajevo (April 7, 1942)
- Active: 3 September 1941 – 8 May 1945
- Disbanded: 8 May 1945
- Country: Croatia
- Allegiance: (Nazi Germany) Germany (Fascist Italy) Italy
- Branch: Ustaše Militia
- Type: Mechanized infantry
- Role: Anti-partisan and Anti-chetnik operations
- Size: Regiment
- Nickname: Blacks (Crnci)
- Mottos: Za poglavnika i za dom spremni! (Ready for Poglavnik and homeland)
- Colors: Black
- March: Evo zore, evo dana
- Engagements: World War II: Operation Ozren; Operation Trio; Battle of Kozara; Battle of Kupres; Operation Vlasenica; Operation Dinara; Operation Kugelblitz

Commanders
- Notable commanders: Jure Francetić; Rafael Boban

Insignia
- Identification symbol: Black uniform

The Black Legion (Croatian: Crna Legija), officially the 1st Standing Active Brigade (Prvi stajaći djelatni sdrug), was a Ustaše Militia infantry unit active during World War II in the Independent State of Croatia, an Axis-aligned puppet state. The legion was formed in September 1941 as the 1st Ustaša Regiment. It consisted largely of Bosnian Muslim and Croat fascists from eastern Bosnia, where they carried out large-scale massacres of Serb civilians. The legion's commanders were Colonel Jure Francetić and Major Rafael Boban. It consisted of between 1,000 and 1,500 trained mechanized infantrymen.

== History ==
The Black Legion was formed in Sarajevo in April 1941 with 12 founding members, of whom 11 were Croats and one was a Bosnian Muslim. The force grew to be predominantly Muslim in response to the atrocities carried out against Bosnian Muslims.

After the battle of Kupres, the Legion's 1st and 2nd battalion were used to form the cadre for the newly formed 5th Standing Active Brigade which was put under the command of Rafael Boban and incorporated into the 5th division of the Croatian Armed Forces in December 1944.

In August 1942, Francetić was appointed the supreme commander of all standing active brigades of the Ustaše Army and the Legion's new commander became Colonel Ivo Stipković. Under Stipković's command the Legion lost even more men when the 23rd and 28th battalions (composed mainly of Bosnian Muslims) were disbanded and their soldiers transferred to the 13th Waffen Mountain Division of the SS Handschar. After the death of Colonel Stipković in September 1943 the Legion's commander became Major Milan Šulentić but just eight days later he was replaced by Major Franjo Sudar. Near the end of 1944 the Legion was incorporated into the 1st division of the Croatian Armed Forces under the command of General Roman Domanik. Soldiers of the Black Legion continued to wear the black uniform right up to the end of the war, probably as a sort of honorary mark of distinction. Lastly, at least 120 former Black Legion men were executed by the Partisans at Sisak in May 1945. When the war ended, many soldiers of the Black Legion refused to surrender and joined the Crusaders.
