= Einsatzstaffel (Independent State of Croatia) =

Einsatzstaffel der Deutschen Mannschaft
- Ajnzacštafel; Vojnica njemačke narodne skupine
- Stahlhelm decal of the Einsatzstaffel
- Active: 31 July 1941 — 1 May 1943
- Disbanded: 1 May 1943
- Country: Independent State of Croatia
- Branch: Ustaše Militia
- Engagements: World War II in Yugoslavia: Anti-partisan operations; Mačva operation

The Einsatzstaffel der Deutschen Mannschaft (EDM) (lit. 'Action squad of the German team') was a military unit of the Axis puppet state the Independent State of Croatia (NDH), whose members were ethnic Germans (Volksdeutsche) who lived in Slavonia and Syrmia (in modern-day Croatia and Serbia). The EDM was part of the Ustaše Militia.

== Establishment and organization ==
The establishment of the Einsatzstaffel der Deutschen Mannschaft was proposed to Ante Pavelić by Branimir Altgayer, leader of the German population in the NDH. The EDM was established based on the legislative provisions about establishment of the political army of members of German population (Croatian: Zakonska odredba o postrojenju vojnice „Njemačke narodne skupine“) adopted on 31 July 1941. The EDM was part of the "Deutsche Mannschaft" organization composed of members of the Volksdeutsche community selected from men of age between 18 and 45 who were supporters of Nazism. The "Deutsche Mannschaft" had two main bodies, general part and military formation - Einsatzstaffel. Initially, their name was Waffenabteilung der Deutschen Mannschaft which was renamed to Einsatzstaffel der Deutschen Mannschaft. The EDM was part of the Ustaše Militia, which was nominally under the command of the Ministry of the Croatian Home Guard. The soldiers of the EDM took an oath of allegiance to both Ante Pavelić and Hitler.

Altgayer, who had a title of Folksgruppenfuhrer, set initial organization of the EDM on 15 October 1941 when he issued military directives of organization and use of the EDM. The organization of the EDM included:

- the General Staff (Headquarters)
- two active companies
- four reserve companies
- staff guard

The first volunteer units were organized as battalion in October 1941 with three companies.The directives issues by Altgayer were cancelled on 12 January 1942 and replaced with temporary directives of organization and use of the EDM. At the beginning of 1943 the EDM consisted of four battalions. The first battalion they established was named Prinz Eugen, followed by Ludwig von Baden, General Laudon and Max Emanuel von Bayern. In the first half of 1943 in Osijek the Supplementary Battalion (German: Ersatzbatalion der Einsatzstaffel) of the EDM was established consisting of two companies with 277 soldiers and 3 officers. In the same period the Motorized Battalion (German: Motorisierte Abteilung) of the EDM was also established. Eventually, the EDM reached regimental size.

The members of the EDM used grey uniforms similar to those worn by the Waffen SS, with SS badges of rank. Germans who enlisted into the EDM were able to serve an army together with members of their community, close to their homes. The SS was not satisfied with this arrangement because they needed new German recruits for the Eastern Front, so the NDH agreed to make 10% of all eligible members of Volksdeutsche available to be recruited into the Waffen SS. In September 1942, the reorganization of the EDM began with the goal of incorporating them into the Waffen SS and the German police. By 1 May 1943, the EDM was disbanded and its members mostly joined the SS. Of the 10,270 Germans enlisted in the SS and other German units at that time, the vast majority previously served in the EDM.

== Engagements ==
In the period between 27 June and 3 July 1941 about 1,500 EDM troops commanded by Jakob Lichtenberger participated in the operations against resistance members in eastern Syrmia (modern-day Serbia) east of the line Beočin - Voganj - Šimanovci - Progar.

The EDM was in charge of the Lobor concentration camp and provided the commander of the camp, the staff and its guards. They were also in charge of the Tenja concentration camp.

At the beginning of September 1941 the representative of Germany, Siegfried Kache, leader of the German population of the NDH, Branimir Altagayer, the župan of Vuka, and other German and NDH representatives agreed to dispatch one company of the EDM with 300 soldiers to participate in the Mačva operation against Partisan and Chetnik forces in Serbian region of Mačva between 24 September and 7 November 1941.

According to a 1944 list compiled by local German organizations, from May 1941 to mid-October 1943, a total of 441 members of the military unit were killed in action while fighting the Yugoslav Partisans.

== Ranks ==
Collar Insignia	Shoulder Insignia	Rank	Translation
		ES-General	General
		ES-Oberst	Colonel
		ES-Oberstleutnant	Lieutenant Colonel
		ES-Major	Major
		ES-Hauptmann	Captain
		ES-Oberleutnant	Senior Lieutenant
		ES-Leutnant	Lieutenant
		ES-Fähnrich	Officer cadet
		ES-Stabsfeldwebel	Regimental sergeant major
		ES-Oberfeldwebel	Sergeant Major
		ES-Feldwebel	Staff sergeant
		ES-Unteroffizier	Corporal
		ES-Obergefreiter	Lance corporal
		ES-Gefreiter	Senior Private
		ES-Schütze	Private

== Sources ==
- Boban, Ljubo (1976). Sjeverozapadna Hrvatska u NOB-u i socijalističkoj revoluciji: zbornik. Zajednica općina memorijalnog područja Kalnik.
- Jareb, Mario (2007). "The German Ethnic Group in the Independent State of Croatia [Deutsche Volksgrupe in Kroatien] from 1941 to 1945". Review of Croatian History. 3 (1). Croatian Institute of History: 201–217.
- Krnić, Zdravko (1966). "O iseljavanju pripadnika Njemačke narodne skupine (Volksdeutschera) iz NDH za vrijeme II svjetskog rata". Zbornik (in Croatian). 4. Croatia: Historijski institut Slavonije i Baranje.
- Littlejohn, David (1994). Foreign Legions of the Third Reich. Volume 3. United States of America: R. James Publishing. ISBN 9780912138299.
- Lumans, Valdis O. (9 November 2000). Himmler's Auxiliaries: The Volksdeutsche Mittelstelle and the German National Minorities of Europe, 1933-1945. Univ of North Carolina Press. ISBN 978-0-8078-6311-4.
- Lumsden, Robin (2009). Himmler's SS: Loyal to the Death's Head. History Press. ISBN 978-0-7524-5026-1.
- Mikulan, Krunoslav; Pogačić, Siniša (1999). Hrvatske Oružane Snage 1941-1945 (in Croatian). Zagreb: Krila. ISBN 9789539756428.
- Mollo, Andrew (1976). German Uniforms of World War 2. Hippocrene Books. ISBN 978-0-88254-402-1.
- Obhođaš, Amir; Werhas, Mario; Dimitrijević, Bojan; Despot, Zvonimir (2013). Ustaška vojnica 1 [Ustaše Militia 1] (in Croatian). Zagreb: Despot Infinitus. ISBN 9789537892104.
- Obhođaš, Amir; Werhas, Mario; Dimitrijević, Bojan; Despot, Zvonimir (2013b). Ustaška vojnica 2 [Ustaše Militia 2] (in Croatian). Zagreb: Despot Infinitus. ISBN 978-953-7892-17-3.
- Savić, Sreta (1967). Borbe u Sremu 1941-1944. Savez udruženja boraca NOR Srbije za Vojvodinu, "Dnevnik,".
- Stuparić, Darko (1997). Tko je tko u NDH: Hrvatska 1941.-1945. Minerva. ISBN 978-953-6377-03-9.
- Terzić, Velimir (1982). Slom Kraljevine Jugoslavije 1941: uzroci i posledice poraza. Narodna knjiga.
- Unknown (1974). "Title needed". Zbornik (in Croatian). 11. Croatia: Historijski institut Slavonije i Baranje.
