= Heinrich Nickel =

German general

Heinrich Georg Nickel
- Born: 5 December 1894
- Died: 2 January 1979 (aged 84)
- Military career
- Allegiance: Nazi Germany
- Branch: Army (Wehrmacht)
- Rank: Generalleutnant
- Commands: 342nd Infantry Division
- Conflicts: World War II
- Awards: Knight's Cross of the Iron Cross with Oak Leaves

Heinrich Georg Nickel (5 December 1894 – 2 January 1979) was a German general in the Wehrmacht of Nazi Germany who commanded the 342nd Infantry Division. He was a recipient of the Knight's Cross of the Iron Cross with Oak Leaves.

== Awards and decorations ==
- Iron Cross (1914) 2nd Class (29 July 1916) 1st Class (18 August 1918)
- Clasp to the Iron Cross (1939) 2nd Class (19 September 1939) & 1st Class (13 November 1939)
- German Cross in Gold on 29 March 1943 as Oberst in Grenadier-Regiment 502
- Knight's Cross of the Iron Cross with Oak Leaves
  - Knight's Cross on 16 June 1940 as Oberst and commander of III./Infanterie-Regiment 26
  - 543rd Oak Leaves on 8 August 1944 as Generalleutnant and commander of 342. Infanterie-Division

Military offices
Preceded by Generalleutnant Albrecht Baier	Commander of 342nd Infantry Division; 25 September 1943 - 8 May 1945	Succeeded by None
