= Draginac (Loznica) =

Draginac Драгинац (Serbian)
- Village (Selo)
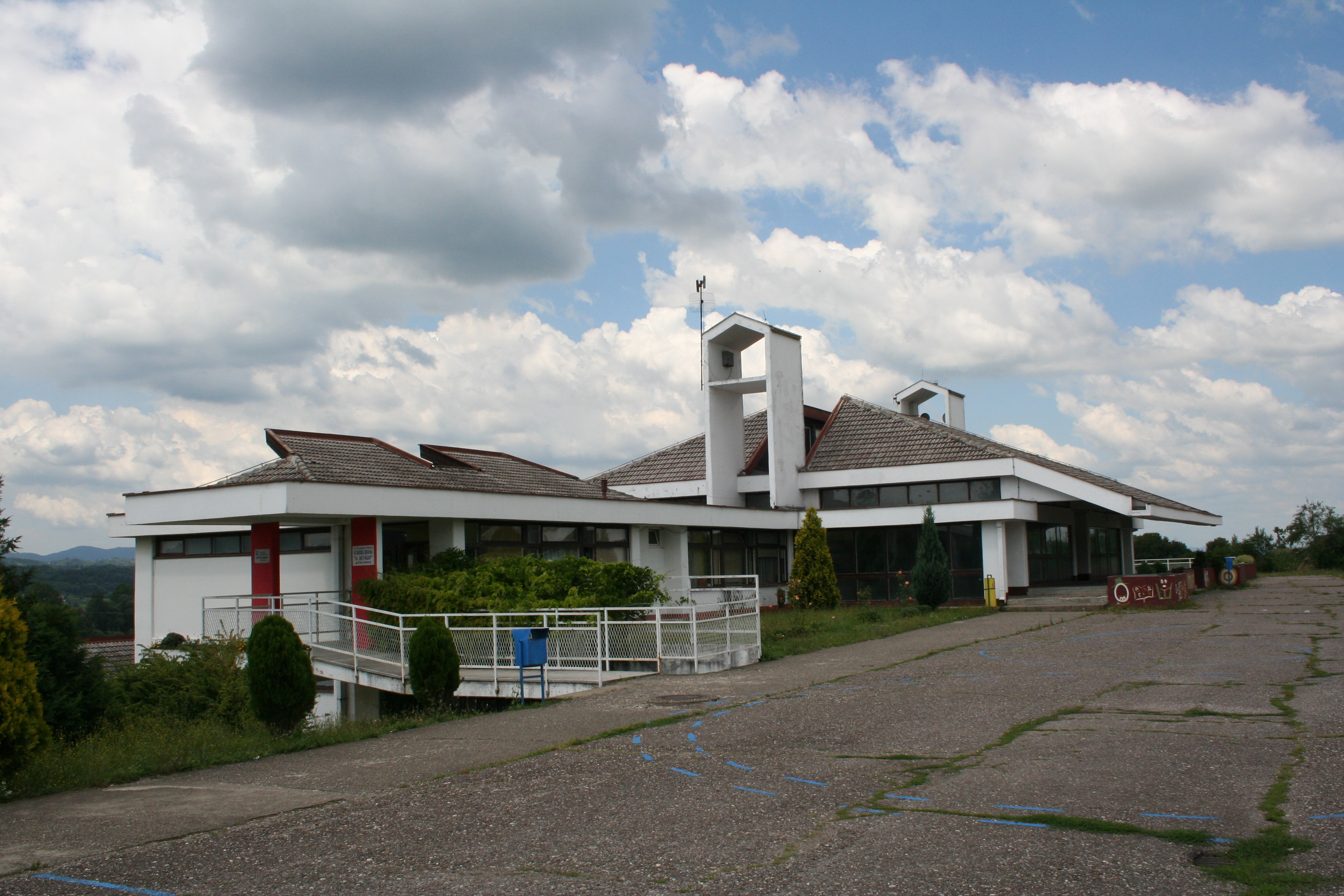
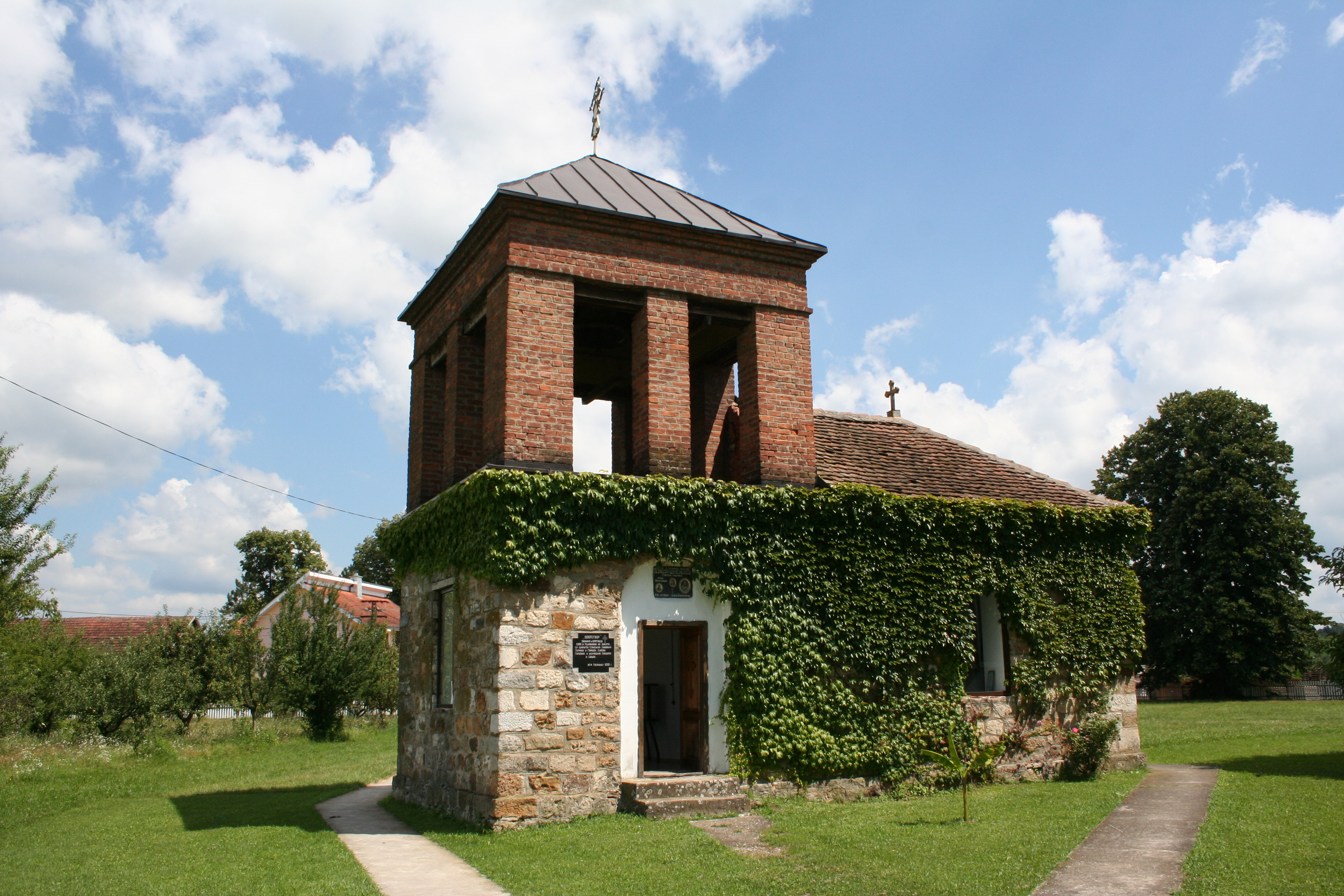
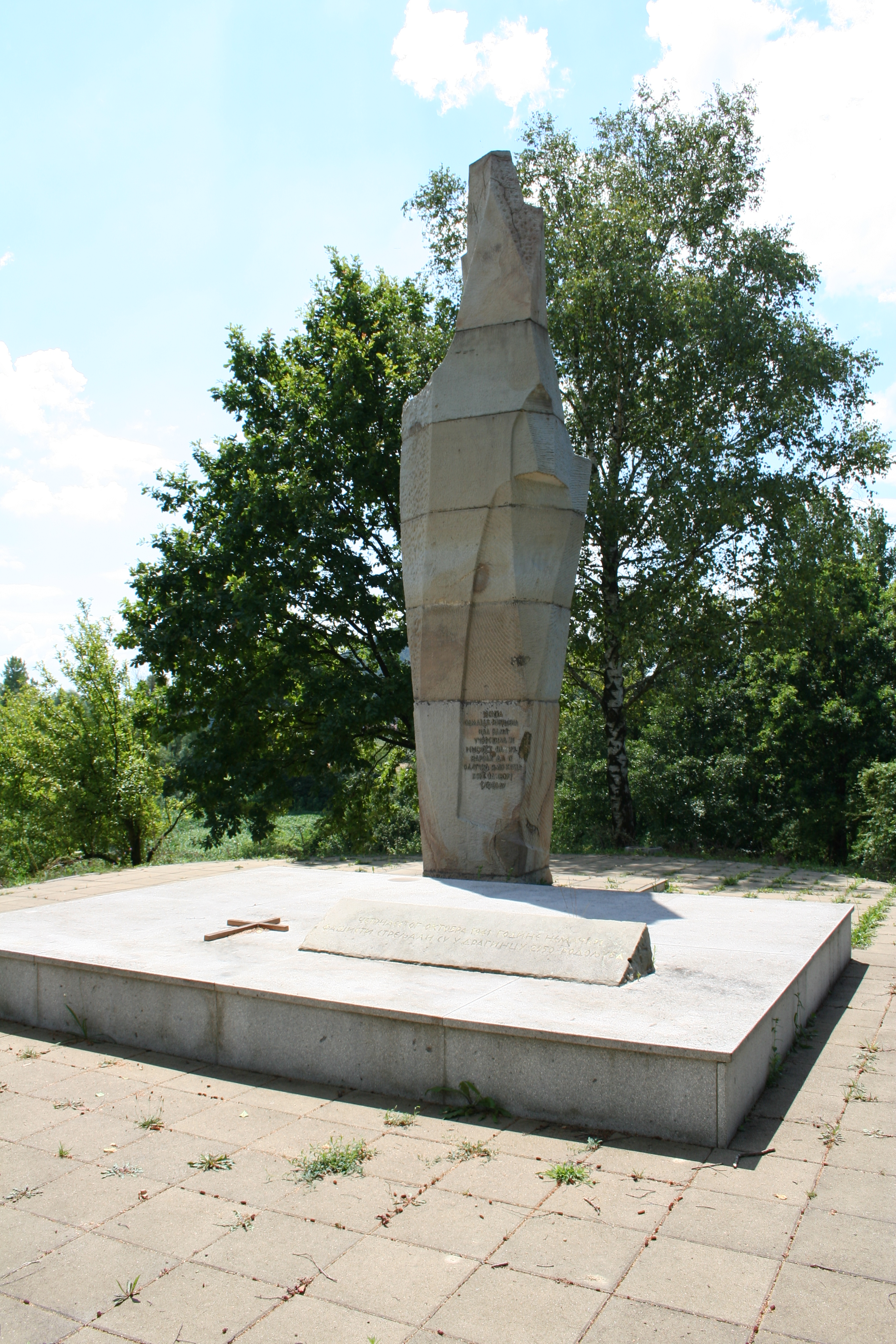
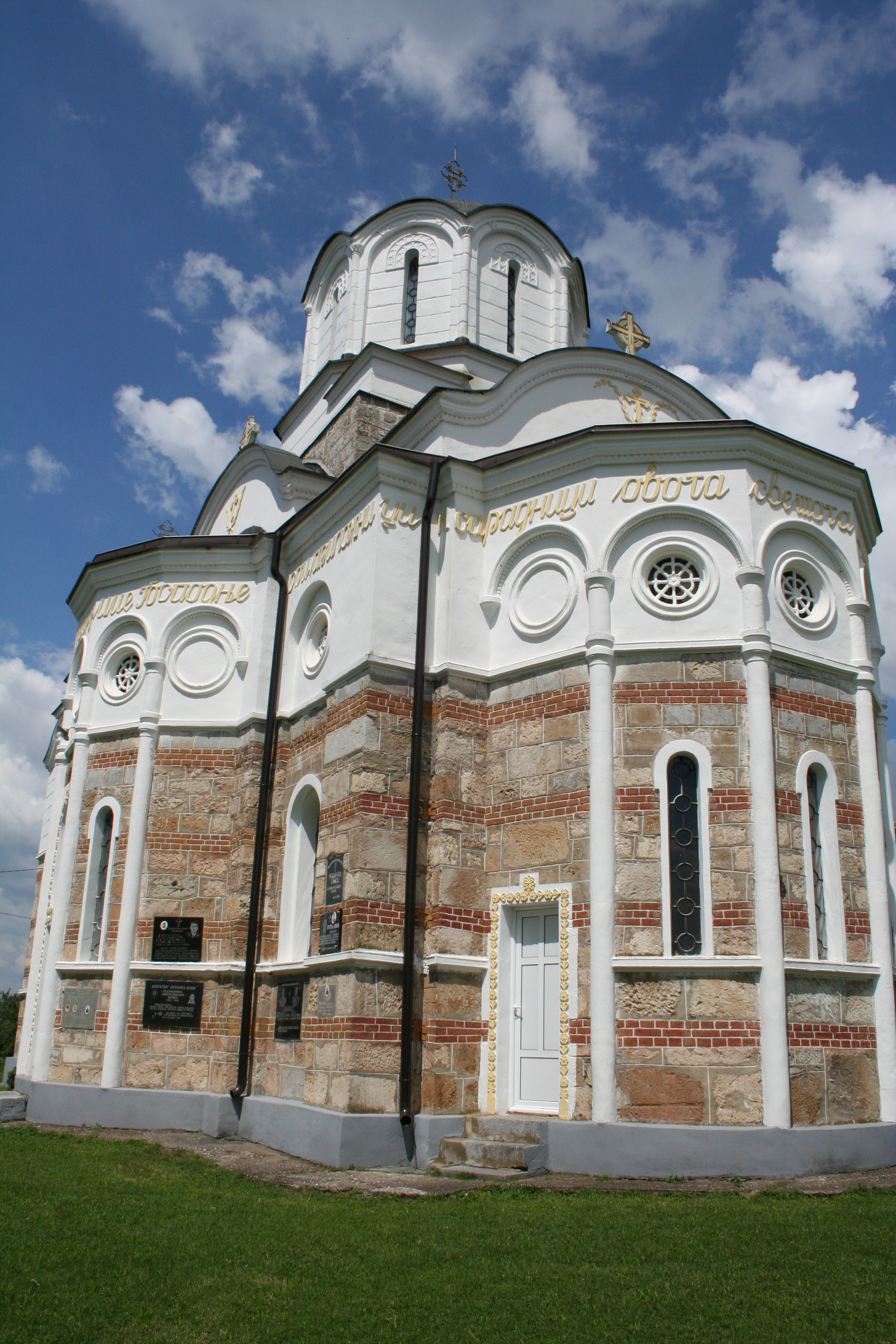

- Location within Serbia
- Coordinates: 44°30′42″N 19°25′53″E
- Country: Serbia
- District: Mačva District
- Municipality: Loznica

Population (2002)
  - Total: 324
- Time zone: UTC+1 (CET)
  - Summer (DST): UTC+2 (CEST)

Draginac is a village in the municipality of Loznica, Serbia. According to the 2002 census, the village has a population of 324 people.

== History ==
In October 1941, during the Mačva operation, approximately 3000 people were massacred by Nazis. The victims are suspected Serb partisan sympathizers, Roma and Jewish civilians.
