= Rafael Boban =

Croatian Ustaše military commander

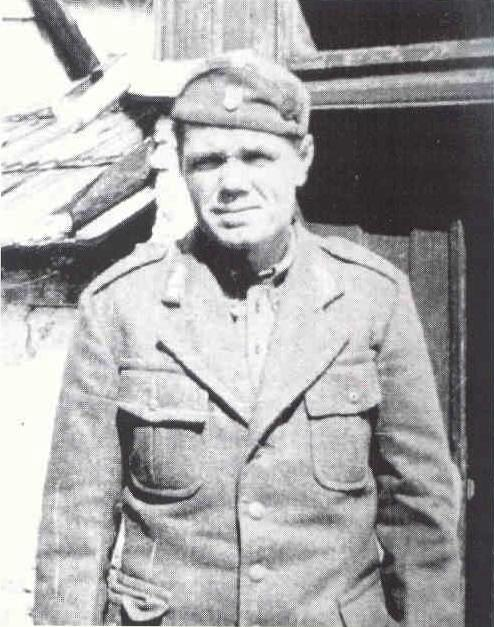
- Rafael Boban in the 1940s
- Born: Rafael Boban; 22 December 1907; Sovići, Condominium of Bosnia and Herzegovina, Austria-Hungary
- Disappeared: May 1945 (aged 37); Bleiburg, Allied-occupied Austria
- Military career
- Allegiance: (Kingdom of Yugoslavia) Yugoslavia (?–1932); Ustaše (1932–1945) (Kingdom of Italy) Italy (1935-1941); Independent State of Croatia (1941–1945); Crusaders (1945-1947); Croatian government in exile (1951-?); United States (allegedly during Korean War )
- Branch: Royal Yugoslav Army (?-1932); Ustaše Militia (1932-1945); Royal Italian Army (1935-1941); Croatian Armed Forces (1944-1945)
- Rank: General (Croatian Armed Forces); Colonel (Ustaše Militia); Minister of Defence in-exile (Croatian government in exile)
- Nickname: Ranko
- Commands: Black Legion
- Conflicts: Velebit uprising; World War II; Eastern Herzegovina Uprising; Crusader Rebellion (rumored to have been killed); Korean War (rumored to have fought)

Rafael "Ranko" Boban (22 December 1907 – disappearance in May 1945) was a Croatian military commander who served in the Ustaše Militia and Croatian Armed Forces during World War II. Having participated in the Velebit uprising in 1932, he joined the Royal Italian Army and returned to Croatia following the Axis invasion of Yugoslavia in April 1941. He fought with the Ustaše until the end of the war, when he is reported to have evaded the Yugoslav Partisans and reached the Austrian town of Bleiburg. Nothing is known of what happened to him afterwards, and it was rumoured that he was either killed in Podravina in 1945, died fighting with the Crusaders in Herzegovina in 1947, or, less likely, emigrated to the United States via Argentina, joined the United States Army and fought Communist forces in the Korean War. In 1951, he was named the Croatian Minister of Defence in-exile by Ustaše leader Ante Pavelić.

== Early life ==
Rafael Boban was born on 22 December 1907 in the village of Sovići, near the town of Grude, Austria-Hungary. He was a Roman Catholic Herzegovinian Croat. He served as an officer in the Royal Yugoslav Army prior to joining Ustaše units based in Fascist Italy in the summer of 1932. In September 1932, he returned to Yugoslavia and participated in the Ustaše-led Velebit uprising against Yugoslav rule. Afterwards, he traveled to Italian-controlled Zadar to request Italian citizenship and protection. In May 1934, Ustaše leader Ante Pavelić promoted Boban to the rank of sergeant in the Ustaše and he became a member of Pavelić's inner circle. The following year, Boban became a deputy commander of a Royal Italian Army company based in Lipari before being transferred to Calabria. At the beginning of December 1937, Italian authorities arrested him and other members of the Ustaše on suspicion that they were planning to assassinate Yugoslav Prime Minister Milan Stojadinović. They were all quickly released.

== World War II ==
With the creation of the Independent State of Croatia (Croatian: Nezavisna Država Hrvatska, NDH) in April 1941, Boban returned to Croatia and joined the Ustaše Militia. He went to Kupres with 250 Ustaše under his command and organized mass murder of local Serbs.

During the June 1941 uprising in eastern Herzegovina Boban was member of group of Ustaše officers led by Mijo Babić which reinforced Ustaše troops attacking the Serb rebels. Their aim was to suppress the uprising and completely destroy Serb population. On 3 July 1941 Boban commanded one of three main groups of Ustaše forces that attacked the rebels along the line: Vranjkuk - Rupari - Trusina - Šušnjatica. On 24 July 1941 Boban commanded a group of Ustaše from Međugorje and Čitluk that imprisoned 20 Serb villagers from village Baćevići and killed them in Međugorje, disposing their bodies in a nearby pit.

He was promoted to the rank of captain in November and later became commander of the Black Legion alongside Jure Francetić. Boban assumed full command of the legion following Francetić's death in December 1942. Ustaše propaganda declared him Francetić's natural successor. The legion operated in various parts of the NDH under his command.

Boban was promoted to the rank of general in December 1944 and became the head of the Podravina-based Fifth Ustaše Active Brigade of the Croatian Armed Forces that month. That autumn, he was responsible for guarding the imprisoned politicians Mladen Lorković and Ante Vokić in the town of Koprivnica. He held the rank of colonel within the Ustaše Militia by April 1945. In May, he withdrew with the Ustaše towards Austria and is reported to have successfully reached the town of Bleiburg, alongside Pavelić and Vjekoslav Luburić.

Many theories exist about what happened to him. One theory states that he was killed in Podravina in 1945, while another states that he either died fighting with the Crusaders in Herzegovina in 1947 or that he emigrated to the United States via Argentina, joined the United States Army and fought Communist forces in the Korean War.

== Legacy ==
In 1951, Boban was named the Croatian Minister of Defence in-exile by Pavelić. During the Bosnian War, a brigade of the Croatian Defence Council (HVO) was named after him. The Roman Catholic church in the Herzegovinian village of Bobani is decorated with his pictures. In July 2022, twenty-five of the Mostar city council's thirty-five members voted to remove street names named after figures linked to the World War II fascist and genocidal Ustaše movement, among them Boban, Mile Budak, Mladen Lorković, Ante Vokić, Đuro Spužević, Jure Francetić and Ivo Zelenek. This decision was welcomed by the United States Embassy in Sarajevo and Christian Schmidt, then High Representative for Bosnia and Herzegovina.
