= 342nd Infantry Division =

- German: 342. Infanterie-Division
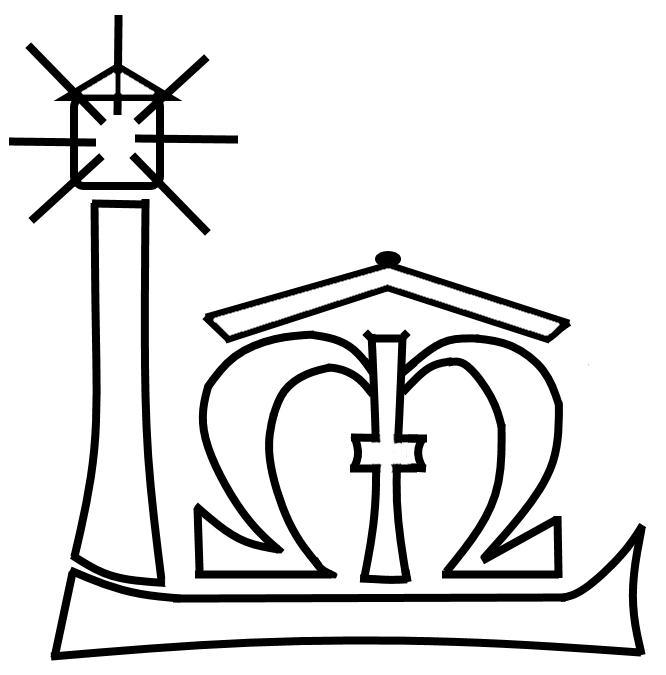
- 342. Infanterie Division Vehicle Insignia
- Active: 19 November 1940 – April 1945
- Country: Nazi Germany
- Branch: Heer (Wehrmacht)
- Type: Infantry
- Size: Division
- Engagements: World War II in Yugoslavia (1941–1942); Battles of Rzhev; Operation Bagration; Vistula–Oder Offensive; Battle of Halbe

Commanders
- Notable commanders: Walter Hinghofer; Paul Hoffman; Heinrich Nickel

The 342nd Infantry Division (German: 342. Infanterie-Division) was a formation of the German Wehrmacht during World War II. Established on 19 November 1940, it was formed from elements of two existing divisions. It first served as part of the occupation forces in France between June and September 1941 and was then largely responsible for the brutal repression of resistance in eastern parts of Axis-occupied Yugoslavia between September 1941 and February 1942.

The division was then transferred to Army Group Centre on the Eastern Front where it distinguished itself in the fighting throughout 1942–1944. After heavy losses, it underwent a brief period of re-organisation in April 1944 and returned to the front in May 1944 to fight throughout the retreat to Germany. It was almost destroyed in the fighting on the Vistula, and was encircled in the Halbe pocket at the end of the war, but some elements of the division managed to surrender to the United States Army at Travemünde. Nineteen officers and men of the division were awarded the Knight's Cross of the Iron Cross while serving with the division, and its last commander, Generalleutnant Heinrich Nickel was awarded the Oak Leaves to his Knight's Cross while commanding the division.

== History ==
=== Formation ===
The division was formed on 19 November 1940 in Wehrkreis XII (Military District XII) with its home station at Landstuhl. One third of the original strength was transferred from the 72nd Infantry Division and one third from the 79th Infantry Division. This meant that part of the divisional strength originated from around Koblenz in the Rhineland, and part from around Linz in Austria. It was a Category 14 division, which were established with the usual three infantry regiments, but with only 12 companies per regiment instead of the usual 14. It included an artillery regiment, but had a reduced complement of equipment in all areas, and its soldiers were between 27 and 32 years of age. Its commander from formation was Generalmajor (Brigadier) Rudolf Wagner. Following its formation it was first deployed as part of the occupation forces in France between June and September 1941. On 2 July 1941, Wagner was replaced by Generalleutnant (Major General) Dr. Walter Hinghofer, an Austrian-born career officer who had served the whole of World War I fighting the Russians on the Eastern Front. On 14 September 1941, the division was ordered to deploy to Belgrade in the Territory of the Military Commander in Serbia where it was to come under the command of LXV Corps. This was the result of repeated requests for reinforcements from the Wehrmacht Commander Southeast, Generalfeldmarschall Wilhelm List due to a growing insurgency in the eastern parts of the partitioned Kingdom of Yugoslavia.

=== Yugoslavia ===
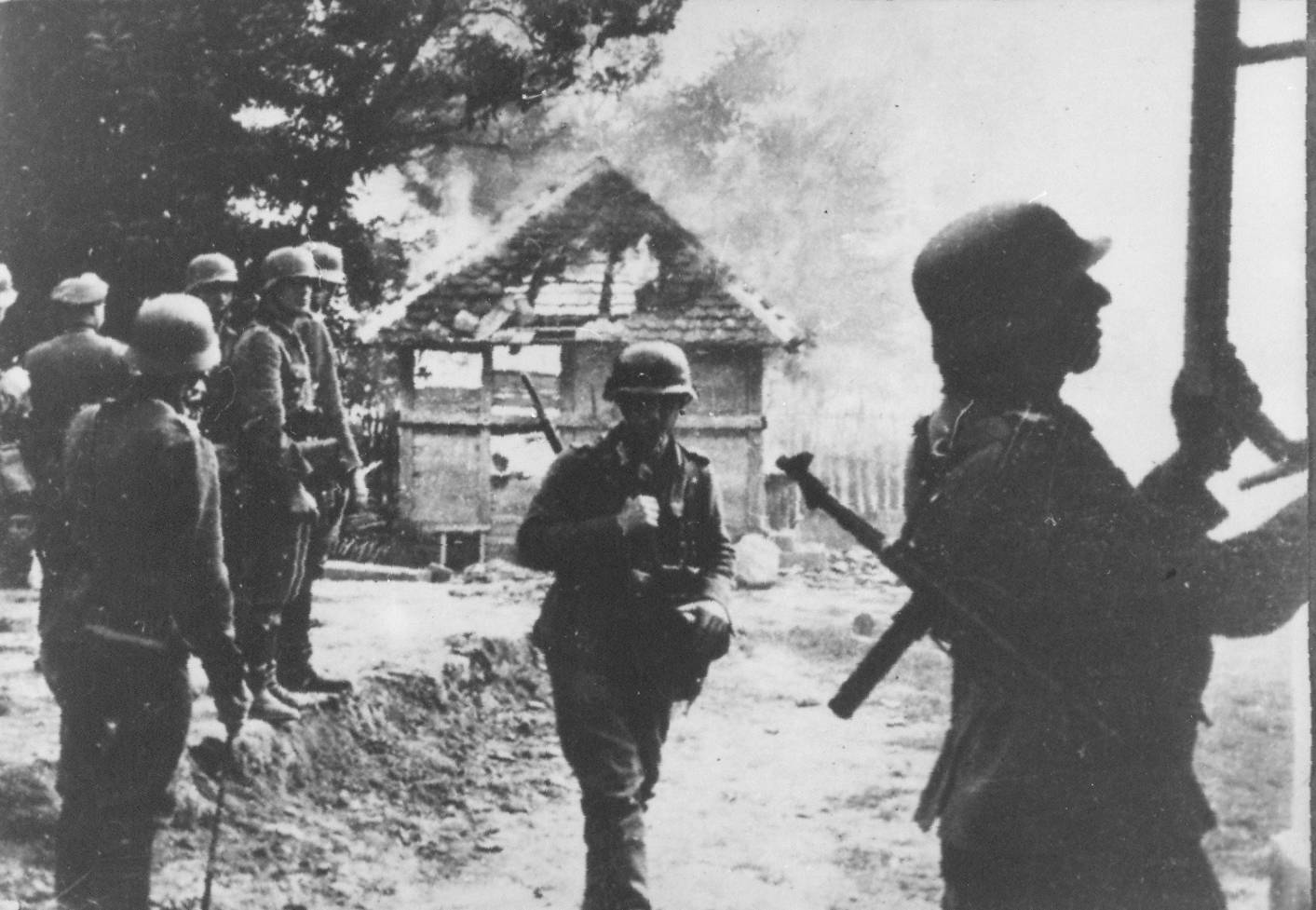
Members of the 342nd Infantry Division burning villages in the German-occupied territory of Serbia in 1941

The division began arriving from France on 20 September 1941, and was quickly committed to counter-insurgency operations in the northwestern part of the German-occupied territory of Serbia. Between 24 September and 9 October it conducted its first operation, which was aimed at clearing the Mačva region, which consisted of around 600 square kilometres (230 sq mi) west of the town of Šabac between the Drina and Sava rivers. It was reinforced by a battalion from the 718th Infantry Division and a police company, and advanced into the region from the Syrmia region to the north. The Germans estimated the numbers of Partisans and Chetniks in the area at between 2,000 and 10,000. The division rounded up large numbers of males between the ages of 14 and 70 in the towns and villages, razed many houses, and exceeded the mandated reprisal ratios of the numbers of prisoners executed per German soldier killed or wounded, shooting 830 of the 8,400 prisoners it took between 21 and 30 September, the great majority of which were unarmed civilians. However, the division had decisively engaged the main insurgent forces which withdrew into the Cer mountains.

This was closely followed by two more operations, one in the Cer mountains between 10–15 October, and one towards Krupanj on 19 and 20 October. The Cer operation targeted around 2,500 well-armed Chetniks and 4,000 poorly-equipped Partisans, and the division burned many villages and shot over 3,000 more people despite capturing few weapons and taking few prisoners. They destroyed insurgent strongholds in the Radovasnica and Mount Tronosa monasteries, but despite completing their encirclement of the area most of the targeted insurgents escaped to the west. The Krupanj operation was essentially treated as revenge for two companies of the 704th Infantry Division that had been overrun in the town a few weeks earlier, but again failed to decisively engage the insurgents. During the period from 10 to 19 October the 342nd suffered six men killed with another 24 wounded, but reported that it had killed 546 insurgents and executed another 1,081 after capture, from whom it captured a total of four guns. On 12-13 October, soldiers of the 342nd Division took all the Jewish men of the mostly Austrian "Kladovo group" of refugees who had been imprisoned in the Sabac concentration camp, as well as 160 Roma and some Serbs, to Zasavica (~40 km from the Šabac concentration camp) where all of them (over 800 men) were executed in a farmer's field.

It played a key role in Operation Uzice and Operation Mihailovic, which targeted the Yugoslav Partisans and Chetniks respectively. In early January 1942, after being relieved by Bulgarian forces, the division was transferred to the Independent State of Croatia where it took part in Operation Southeast Croatia, after which a regiment of the division took part in Operation Ozren under the command of the 718th Infantry Division. During its service in Yugoslavia the division earned a reputation for ruthless and ferocious brutality against insurgents and the populace alike.

=== Eastern Front ===
In February 1942 it was sent to Army Group Centre on the Eastern Front where it fought in the Battles of Rzhev and the retreat after the Battle of Kursk.

It was withdrawn briefly in April 1944 to refit and re-organise in East Prussia, but returned to the front in May and distinguished itself twice against the Russians that summer. It fought at Kovel, during the withdrawal across eastern Poland and at the Baranov bridgehead on the Vistula.

On 1 January 1945, the division, then under command of the 4th Panzer Army of Army Group A, had a strength of 10,124 men.

When the Russians broke out of the bridgehead in January 1945, the division was almost completely destroyed during the Vistula–Oder Offensive, but it fought on as a kampfgruppe until it was encircled in the Halbe pocket during the Battle for Berlin. Some members of the division managed to escape westwards to surrender to the United States Army at Travemünde near Lübeck on the Baltic Sea.

== Order of battle ==
The major units of the division were:

- 697th Infantry Regiment
- 698th Infantry Regiment
- 699th Infantry Regiment
- 342nd Artillery Regiment
- 342nd Fusilier Battalion
- 342nd Panzerjäger (Anti-tank) Battalion
- 342nd Pioneer Battalion

== Commanders ==
The division was commanded by the following officers:

- Generalmajor (Brigadier) Rudolf Wagner (November 1940 – 1 July 1941)
- Generalleutnant (Major General) Dr. Walter Hinghofer (2 July – 31 October 1941)
- Oberst (Colonel) Paul Hoffman (1–30 November 1941)
- Oberst Hans Roth (December 1941)
- Oberst then Generalmajor Paul Hoffman (January – 9 May 1942)
- Generalmajor Baron Albrecht von Digeon von Monteton (10 May – 8 July 1942)
- Generalmajor Paul Hoffman (9–31 July 1942)
- Generalmajor then Generalleutnant Albrecht Baier (1 August 1942 – 24 September 1943)
- Oberst then Generalmajor then Generalleutnant Heinrich Nickel (25 September 1943 to the end of the war)

Hoffman was promoted to generalmajor on 1 June 1942, Baier was promoted to generalleutnant on 1 January 1943, and Nickel was promoted to generalmajor on 1 January 1944 then generalleutnant on 1 July 1944.

== Awards ==
A total of 19 officers and men were awarded the Knight's Cross of the Iron Cross while serving with the division, and its last commander, Generalleutnant Heinrich Nickel was awarded the Oak Leaves to his Knight's Cross while commanding the division.

== Bibliography ==
- Shepherd, Ben (2012). "Settling Accounts in Blood: The 342d Infantry Division in Serbia". Terror in the Balkans: German Armies and Partisan Warfare. Harvard University Press. pp. 119–147. ISBN 9780674048911.
