= Jure Francetić =

Croatian Ustaše military commander

- Born: 3 July 1912; Otočac, Croatia-Slavonia, Austria-Hungary
- Died: 27/28 December 1942 (aged 30); Močile, near Slunj, Independent State of Croatia
- Military career
- Allegiance: Independent State of Croatia
- Branch: Ustaše militia
- Service years: 1941–1942
- Rank: Colonel
- Commands: Black Legion
- Conflicts: World War II; Operation Southeast Croatia; Operation Ozren; Operation Trio; Operation Beta
- Awards: Military Order of the Iron Trefoil (3rd Class); Medal of Poglavnik Ante Pavelić for Bravery

Jure Francetić (3 July 1912 – 27/28 December 1942) was a Croatian Ustaša Commissioner for the Bosnia and Herzegovina regions of the Independent State of Croatia (NDH) during World War II, and commander of the 1st Ustaše Regiment of the Ustaše Militia, later known as the Black Legion. In both roles he was responsible for the massacre of Bosnian Serbs and Jews. A member of Ante Pavelić's inner circle, he was considered by many Ustaše as a possible successor to Pavelić as Poglavnik (leader) of the NDH. He died of wounds inflicted when he was captured by Partisans near Slunj in the Kordun region when his aircraft crash-landed there in late December 1942.

== Early life prior to formation of NDH ==
Francetić was born in Otočac in the mountainous Lika region of modern-day central Croatia on 3 July 1912. After high school where he was influenced by nationalist teachers, he went to study law at the University of Zagreb, where he joined the Ustaša movement and abandoned his studies. Soon after, he was exiled from Zagreb for five years as a result of his anti-Yugoslav political activities. He stayed in Otočac for a short time before emigrating to Italy in March 1933, where he took the Ustaša oath in the Borgotaro camp on 24 April 1933. He spent the next four years in Austria, Italy and Hungary. In Hungary he joined the Ustaša camp at Jankapuszta under the nom de guerre "Laszlo", became deputy commander of the camp, and developed into a fanatical Ustaša.

After the assassination of King Alexander, Francetić was interned on Sardinia by Mussolini at the request of the Yugoslav government. After a general declaration of amnesty in the Kingdom of Yugoslavia, Francetić returned to Croatia in November 1937, but was immediately arrested and exiled to his hometown. The next year Francetić returned to Zagreb hoping to complete his study of law but was forced to complete his military service instead. His nationalist activities included greeting all the inhabitants of Otočac with the slogan "Long live Ante Pavelić! Long live the Independent State of Croatia!". In late 1940 he was arrested in Zagreb due to a congratulatory telegraph to Dr Jozef Tiso, president of the newly formed Slovak Republic, signed by a number of Croat nationalists. He was again exiled to his native Otočac. After delivering an inflammatory nationalistic speech at a local school's New Year's celebration in Otočac on 12 January 1941, he escaped to Germany to avoid arrest.

== World War II ==
=== Commissioner for Bosnia and Herzegovina ===
After the establishment of the NDH on 10 April 1941, Francetić was appointed as the chief Ustaša delegate in Bosnia and Herzegovina with the role of strengthening the Ustaša regime there. He arrived in Sarajevo on 24 April 1941 with Marshal Slavko Kvaternik, around 800 Ustaša militia, and 300 Ustaša police to establish formal control. Francetić effectively became the most powerful political leader in Sarajevo, and established a reputation for ruthlessness in dealing with Serbs and Jews. Francetić's Ustashe took control over the local administration by dismissing all civil servants and teachers belonging to the category of "Srbijanci" (Serbs), as well as Jews. Killings, arrests, and deportation of Serbs and Jews was a regular duty of Francetić's henchmen—based and justified by the official Ustashe policy which demanded the total extermination of Jews and the murder (1/3) and/or expulsion (1/3) and/or forced conversion to Roman Catholicism of Orthodox Serbs in Bosnia and Herzegovina (1/3). "On 23 July 1941 the headquarters of the NDH Ustasha police sent an order to the heads of all regions, including Francetić, to begin with the arrest and transportation of Jews, Serbs and communists to the Gospić concentration camp.

In September 1942, Francetić was removed from his role as the chief government delegate in Bosnia, probably to address the concerns of the Muslims of Bosnia about the atrocities perpetrated by the Ustaše over the last eighteen months.

=== Black Legion ===
In August 1941, Ustaša militia under (then Major) Francetić's command were deployed to eastern Herzegovina in order to counter the uprising there.

The 1st Ustaša Regiment (Croatian: Prva Ustaška pukovnija) was raised by Francetić and Ante Vokić in Sarajevo in September 1941. When the original commander of the regiment was killed, Francetić took over command, and the regiment grew quickly and gained a reputation for fanaticism and violence. Raised for service in eastern Bosnia, by December it had been dubbed the Black Legion (Croatian: Crna Legija) after adopting a black uniform. It was feared for its fanatical morale and fighting qualities, but also for the atrocities it committed against the Bosnian Serb population. It soon grew to a strength of between 1000–1500 men.

In the winter of 1941–1942, the Black Legion carried out massacres in both Prijedor in the north-west of Bosnia and also in the Romanija mountains north-east of Sarajevo. In the latter massacres, they killed thousands of defenceless Bosnian Serb civilians and threw their bodies into the Drina river. Francetić was rumoured to have ordered the killing of more than 3000 of those massacred in these operations.

Francetić earned his only military education and officer rank while serving in the Royal Yugoslav Army. He became a non-commissioned officer in the rank of sergeant. Regarding Francetić's military experience and knowledge, Eugen Dido Kvaternik wrote: "He did not have basic military knowledge and military education, nor did he have any talent for basic military organization." After establishment of the Independent State of Croatia in April 1941 Francetić and 10 others organized the Black Legion. Francetić became the leader of the Black Legion and earned the rank of colonel in the Ustaša army. Kvaternik believed Francetić "a born guerrilla and a son of our mountainous Herzegovina", which was sufficient reason to elevate him to military leader in Bosnia and Herzegovina.

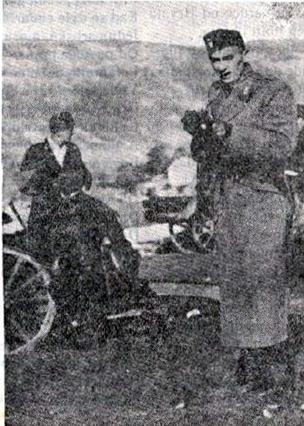
Francetić commands the Black Legion's artillery during the attack on Chetnik positions.

Commencing on 31 March 1942, and against German wishes, Francetić launched an independent offensive against the Partisans and Chetniks in eastern Bosnia. The Black Legion quickly captured Drinjača, Vlasenica, Bratunac and Srebrenica from the Partisans and defeated larger Chetnik forces led by Major Jezdimir Dangić.

Francetić also led the Black Legion during the joint German-Italian-Ustaša offensive Operation Trio in eastern Bosnia in April to June 1942, and according to the overall commander, General Bader, the Black Legion "significantly aided the success of the joint offensive". In May, the Black Legion massacred about 890 Serbs and Jews from Vlasenica after raping women and girls.

As justification for the mass killing of Bosnian Serbs and Jews, Francetić cited "the propaganda of 'the Jewish communist hydra'", which had succeeded in "misleading a majority of the Serb Orthodox population in eastern Bosnia into committing 'criminal acts against the state.'" Francetić stated that "the most drastic means" would have to be employed against them.

Francetić personally arrested and interrogated prominent Serbian and Jewish leaders, and ordered the murders of some of them. Francetić turned his own Sarajevo apartment into a prison kitchen/laundry room. The Ustashe's savagery against Serbs and dissidents reportedly prompted the German command to demand that Francetić, as the commander of the 1st Brigade Black Legion, be dismissed. Pavelić refused, promoting Francetić to commander of all Ustashe field formations.

=== Death ===
Francetić died on either 27 or 28 December 1942, aged 30. While flying to Gospić on 22 December, his plane was downed by Yugoslav Partisans near the village of Močile, near Slunj, which was a Partisan-held area. Both he and his pilot were immediately captured by local villagers. Severely wounded, Francetić was taken to NOVJ General Staff Hospital where Partisan surgeons attempted to save his life in order to exchange him for inmates of Ustaše camps and prisons, but failed.

Ustashe authorities were so concerned about the effect of his death would have on supporters of their movement that the news of his death was delayed until the beginning of March 1943. Official announcement of his death came on March 31, 1943, and Ustashe declared eight days of official mourning.

== Legacy ==
Shoulder patch of the 13th Battalion, HOS

The Croatian Defence Forces (Croatian: Hrvatske obrambene snage) (HOS) was the military arm of the Croatian Party of Rights (HSP) from 1991 to 1992 during the first stages of the Yugoslav wars. The 13th (Tomislavgrad) and 19th (Gospić) battalions of the HOS were given the title 'Jure Francetić' in his memory. In May 1993, one of the formations of the Croatian Defence Council (Croatian: Hrvatsko vijeće obrane, HVO) operating in the Zenica region of Bosnia and Herzegovina was called the "Jure Francetić" Brigade.

A memorial plaque to Francetić was raised in Slunj in June 2000 by the Association of War Veterans ("Hrvatski domobran"). Four years later, in late 2004, the Croatian government ordered the removal of the memorial plaque. In January 2005, in the outskirts of Split, another memorial to Francetić and Mile Budak was built by unknown persons.

== See also ==
- Evo zore, evo dana
