= Ustaše Militia =

Military unit in the Independent State of Croatia

Ustaše Militia Ustaška vojnica
- Badge of the Ustaše Militia
- Active: 11 April 1941 – January 1945
- Country: Independent State of Croatia
- Allegiance: Ante Pavelić
- Branch: Land forces
- Type: Volunteer militia
- Role: Mass murder of civilians and operation of concentration camps, and anti-Partisan operations mostly under German command
- Size: c. 76,000 in December 1944
- Engagements: World War II in Yugoslavia; Operation Trio

Commanders
- Notable commanders: Jure Francetić; Rafael Boban; Vjekoslav Luburić

The Ustaše Militia (Croatian: Ustaška vojnica) was the military branch of the Ustaše, established by the fascist and genocidal regime of Ante Pavelić in the Independent State of Croatia (NDH), an Axis puppet state established from a large part of occupied Yugoslavia during World War II.

The militia went through a series of re-organisations during its existence, expanding to include all armed elements of the NDH government outside of the Croatian Home Guard, Navy, and Air Force. It amalgamated with the Home Guard in December 1944 and January 1945 to form the Croatian Armed Forces (Hrvatske oružane snage, HOS), although the amalgamation did not result in a homogeneous organisation; former Ustaše militia officers dominated HOS's operations and held most command positions.

The Ustaše militia were responsible for some of the most egregious atrocities committed by the Ustaše regime during World War II, including playing a key role in the establishment and operation of about 20 concentration camps in the NDH. Its units included the Black Legion (Crna Legija), commanded by Jure Francetić and Rafael Boban, and the Ustaše Defence Brigades, commanded by Vjekoslav Luburić.

== Formation and organisational changes ==
The Ustaše militia was created on 11 April 1941 when Marshal Slavko Kvaternik appointed a separate staff to control the various volunteer armed groups that had risen spontaneously throughout the NDH as the Yugoslav Army collapsed in the face of the Axis invasion. On 10 May 1941, Ante Pavelić issued a special order which detailed its formal organisation. However, some of the groups that formed early were irregular or "wild" Ustaše units that were not included in the formal organisation, which initially numbered 4,500. The number of irregular Ustaše across the NDH was reportedly as high as 25,000–30,000. Both formal and irregular units were soon involved in atrocities against Serbs, Jews, Gypsies, and all alleged and actual opponents of the Ustaše regime.

The militia consisted mostly of volunteers, and only 25% of the officer corps were professionally trained. Members were indoctrinated in Ustaše ideology and committed to defending Pavelić and the Ustaše regime. Whilst Pavelić was its titular commander-in-chief, he exercised no practical control over its military operations, as Ustaše formations and units in the field were placed under command of Home Guard or Axis forces.

The militia had a significant number of Muslims, although their numbers fell after mid-1943, and there were no Muslim militia leaders and few promoted to higher ranks. It also included the small Volksdeutsche militia (German: Einsatzstaffel der Deutschen Mannschaft, EDM), which was created in July 1941 and grew to 1,500 regular and 1,200 reserve troops by June 1942. The main task of the EDM was to protect German communities in Yugoslavia, mainly in Slavonia and Syrmia.

In August 1941, the Ustaše Surveillance Service (Ustaška nadzorna služba) was created to combat anti-Ustaše activities throughout the NDH. The Surveillance Service consisted of four elements: the Ustaše Police, Ustaše Intelligence Service, Ustaše Defence Brigades, and Personnel. The head of the Surveillance Service was appointed by and directly accountable to Pavelić.

=== "Wild Ustaše" ===
In the first months after Independent State of Croatia has been established, most of Ustaše groups were not under centralized control: besides 4,500 regular Ustasha Corps troops, there were some 25,000-30,000 "Wild Ustasha" (hrv. "divlje ustaše"). The government-controlled press and the state officials encouraged these poorly organized and very aggressive groups to fight enemies of the regime. After mass crimes against Serb populace committed by Ustaše during the Summer months of 1941, the regime decided to blame all the atrocities to the irregular Ustaše - undisciplined, uncontrolled and paid for their service only with the booty; authorities even sentenced to death and executed publicly in August and September 1941 many of them for unauthorized killing and looting against Serbs and Gypsies. To put an end to Wild Ustasha uncontrolled activities, the central government used some 6,000 gendarmes and some 45.000 newly recruited members of "Domobranstvo" forces. In the rest of the war, some "village militias" (hrv. "seoske straže") composed of the Wild Ustaše remained.

The Wild Ustashe groups attracted criminal elements. This was recognised by Pavelić himself - who in fact used these elements as a convenient scapegoat for actions ordered by the core of the Ustaše movement.

=== Formation of special units ===
In late 1941, an Ustaše militia unit known as the Black Legion was formed mostly from Muslim and Croatian refugees from villages in eastern Bosnia, where the Chetniks and Partisans had already committed large-scale massacres. The Legion, which had a strength of between 1,000 and 1,500 men, created a fierce reputation in fighting against both Chetniks and Partisans, and was also responsible for large-scale massacres of Serb civilians. It was initially commanded by Lieutenant Colonel Jure Francetić, and later, after Francetić was killed by the Partisans in December 1942, by Major Rafael Boban. It became part of the HOS 5th Division in December 1944, with Boban promoted to general to command the division.

The other special force was the Ustaše Defence Brigades, commanded by Vjekoslav Luburić, who quickly gained a reputation for extreme brutality. The Brigades ran the string of concentration camps established by the Ustaše regime. Like the Legion, they also fought the Chetniks and Partisans, and were responsible for large-scale atrocities against the Serb population.

=== 1942 reorganisation ===
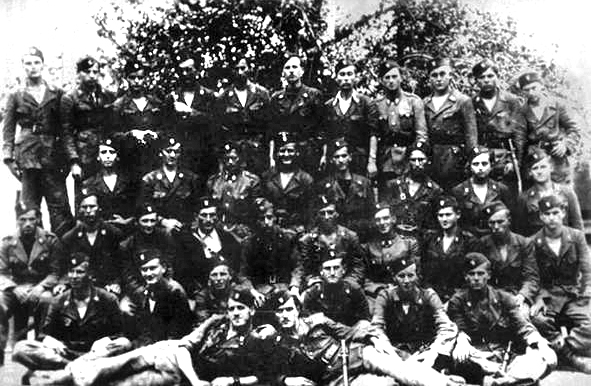
Soldiers of the Ustaše militia from Tomislavgrad.

On 18 March 1942, a law decree organised the armed forces into the Home Guard, Navy, and Air Force; the gendarmerie; and the Ustaše militia. By special decree on 26 June 1942, the gendarmerie, which had previously been part of the Home Guard, became part of the Ustaše militia and was placed under the command of a young Ustaše colonel, Vilko Pečnikar. In July and August 1942, the militia took control of all armed forces of the NDH other than the Home Guard, Navy, and Air Force.

It then consisted of the regular militia, Pavelić's personal guard, the railroad security troops, the gendarmerie, the regular police, the Ustaše Surveillance Service, the Ustaše educational establishment, the Ustaše preparatory service, and the disciplinary court. The Ustaše Surveillance Service included the Ustaše Defence Brigades, which had been established in late 1941.

Following the dismissal of Marshal Kvaternik from his positions of Minister of the Army and commander-in-chief in October 1942, relations between the Ustaše militia and the Croatian Home Guard deteriorated further, to the detriment of the Home Guard.

=== 1943 ===
In May 1943, the militia included about 30 regular battalions of varying strength. Twelve were deployed in the Italian zones of occupation, primarily in Zone III, while the remainder worked with the Home Guard light infantry and mountain brigades and the German-Croatian SS police. This pattern of deployment applied until the amalgamation of the Home Guard and militia in December 1944.

In June 1943, the Ustaše Surveillance Service was abolished, and its functions were transferred to the Ministry of Interior. However, the Ustaše Defence Brigades under Luburić continued to operate independently. By September 1943, shortly after the Italian surrender, the Ustaše militia included 25 battalions (22,500 men), plus Pavelić's personal guard of about 6,000 men, the gendarmerie of about 18,000 men, and many smaller armed groups.

In October 1943, the German commander-in-chief in southeastern Europe, Generalfeldmarschall Maximilian von Weichs, made a proposal to the Wehrmacht operations staff which included the merging of the Ustaše militia into the Croatian Home Guard. The proposal effectively recommended removing the Ustaše from power as part of sweeping changes to the administration of the NDH. Although Hitler considered the proposal, he decided not to proceed with it due mainly to the additional German troops that would have been required to implement it.

=== Amalgamation with Croatian Home Guard ===
On 1 December 1944, the Ustaše militia and the Croatian Home Guard were amalgamated and organised into 16 divisions across three corps. At the time, the militia consisted of about 76,000 officers and men. This figure did not include the Ustaše Defence Brigades, numbering about 10,000, who remained outside the armed forces. Ustaše members with appropriate experience, along with some professional military officers with strong loyalty to Pavelić, were placed in all key positions.

The new force was named the Croatian Armed Forces (Hrvatske oružane snage, HOS), but the amalgamation only combined existing formations such as Ustaše militia brigades and Croatian Home Guard regiments as separate elements under divisional command. Uniforms, equipment, and supply appear to have remained as they were prior to the amalgamation. In March 1945, the Ustaša Defence Brigades were incorporated into the HOS.

== Deployments within the NDH ==
When the Italians reoccupied Zones II and III in 1941, they assumed control of about one-third of the territory of the NDH, and ordered all Ustaše militia units (whom they accused of excesses against the Serb population of the NDH) and most Home Guard units to withdraw from those zones. The NDH government protested vigorously, but the Italians would not relent, and used auxiliary Chetnik units to maintain the peace in those zones instead. By September 1942, no more than about 1,000 Ustaše militia members were in Zone II, and they were under close Italian command and supervision.

In mid-1942, the Germans took full command of any NDH troops operating with them north of the German-Italian demarcation line.

== Composition ==
In mid-1941, the Ustaše militia consisted of 5,000 men, which increased by late 1941 to 16,000 soldiers. In the second half of 1942, its units numbered 42,000. After the capitulation of Italy in September 1943, the Ustaše militia was reorganized. By late 1943, it grew in size to around 55,000 soldiers, organized into nine brigades, three regiments, 48 battalions, and several independent units. There was another reorganization in the 1st half of 1944. The Ustaše militia size increased to 76,000 soldiers.

The Ustaše militia recruited ethnic Croats, Muslims, and Germans in its ranks. An estimated 30% of the Ustaše militia membership was made up of Muslims. Among units stationed in Bosnia and Herzegovina, their share was slightly above 50%, but formed a small part of the officer corps. In July 1943, the Ustaše Headquarters issued an order to fill the ranks of the new SS Handschar Division with Muslims serving in its army. Several elite units were excluded from the order, such as Pavelić's personal guard.

Ethnic Germans within the Ustaše militia were organized in the "German ethnic group militia" (Vojnica Njemačke narodne skupine or Einsatzstaffel der Deutschen Mannschaft). Its battalions and other units, the last of which was formed in early 1943, numbered around 4,700 officers and soldiers. Their reorganization began in September 1942. By 1 May 1943, all of those units were incorporated into the Waffen-SS or German police within the NDH.

Until September 1942, the Ustaše militia was filled exclusively with volunteers. Since then, the Croatian Home Guard conscripts were given an option to carry out their obligatory military service in the Ustaše militia units too. The recruitment of minors was initially not allowed, although their presence, mostly refugees, was not unusual. In December 1944, the Ustaše Headquarters allowed the recruitment of minor volunteers from the age of 16.

	Mid 1941	Late 1941	Late 1942	Late 1943	Mid 1944
Size	5,000	16,000	42,000	55,000	76,000

== Fighting reputation ==
The Ustaše militia was different in almost all respects from the mostly conscripted Croatian Home Guard. While the Home Guard was poorly equipped and subject to mass desertions from late 1942 onwards, the Ustaše militia consisted of young, well equipped and indoctrinated volunteers who were loyal to Pavelić and the NDH. Although they were ill-disciplined, they liked to fight and were tough combat soldiers. It was not until mid-1944 that Ustaše militia units began to suffer from significant numbers of desertions, although these were never on the scale suffered by the Home Guard. As a result of their greater reliability, Ustaše militia units were used on the flanks of suspect Home Guard units fighting Partisans in order to discourage mass desertions during action.

== Anti-Partisan operations and atrocities ==
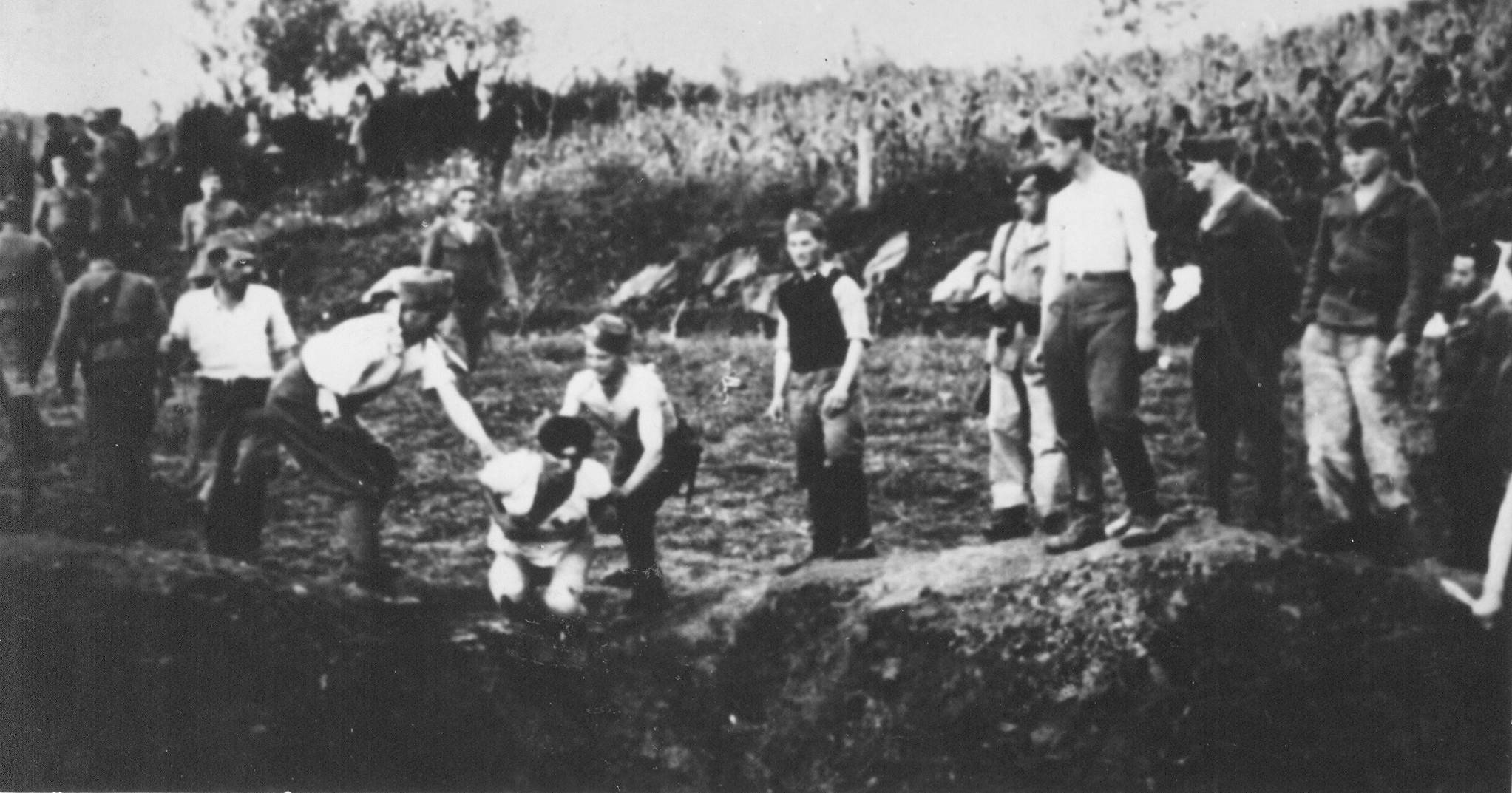
Ustaše militia execute prisoners near the Jasenovac concentration camp

The Ustaše militia committed many abuses and atrocities against the NDH's Serb population. In May 1941, in the town of Glina, 50 kilometres from Zagreb, militia members herded about 260 locals into a church, killed them and set the church on fire. By September 1941, over 118,000 Serbs had been expelled from the NDH, many Orthodox churches had been destroyed or desecrated, and many of the Orthodox clergy had been killed or expelled. The militia used promises of conversion to gather Serb peasants so they could be killed more easily.

In late July 1942, all concentration camps in the NDH were officially transferred from the Ministry of Interior to the Ustaše Surveillance Service, which had been running the camps since August 1941. There were about 20 large and medium-sized camps, the largest of which was a cluster of facilities near the confluence of the Sava and Una rivers at Jasenovac. The camps there were notorious for their brutality, barbarism and large number of victims. Even after the Service was disestablished in January 1943, Vjekoslav Luburić remained in charge of the camps through most of the war.

In August 1942, elements of the Ustaše militia, along with Croatian Home Guard and German forces, conducted a major anti-Partisan operation in Syrmia. During this offensive, Ustaše militia units perpetrated large-scale atrocities against the Serb population. Along with German units, they sent thousands of Serb civilians, including women and children, as well as some Partisans, to the concentration camps at Jasenovac, Sisak, Stara Gradiška, and Zemun.

== Ranks and insignia ==
=== Commissioned officer ranks ===
The rank insignia of commissioned officers.

Rank group	General / flag officers	Senior officers			Junior officers
(Independent State of Croatia) Ustaše Militia
(Independent State of Croatia) Ustaše Militia	Krilnik	Pukovnik	Podpukovnik	Bojnik	Nadsatnik	Satnik	Natporučnik	Poručnik	Zastavnik

=== Other ranks ===
The rank insignia of non-commissioned officers and enlisted personnel.

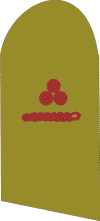
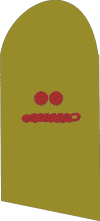
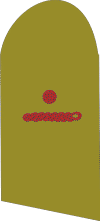
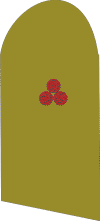
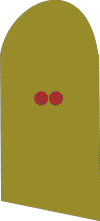
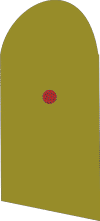
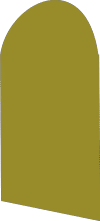
Rank group	Senior NCOs			Junior NCOs		Enlisted
(Independent State of Croatia) Ustaše Militia
(Independent State of Croatia) Ustaše Militia	Časnički namjesnik	Stožerni stražnik	Vodnik	Dovodnik	Rojnik	Dorojnik	Vojničar

== See also ==
- World War II in Yugoslavia

== Bibliography ==
- Dizdar, Zdravko (1996). "Brojidbeni pokazatelji odnosa vojničkih postrojbi na teritoriju Nezavisne Države Hrvatske 1941.-1945. godine" [Statistical indications of the strength of military units in the Independent State of Croatia 1941-1945]. Journal of Contemporary History (in Croatian). 28 (1–2). Zagreb, Croatia: Croatian Institute of History: 161–196.
- Džaja, Srećko Matko (2004). Politička realnost jugoslavenstva [The political reality of Yugoslavism] (in Croatian). Svjetlo riječi. ISBN 9789958741357.
- Kisić Kolanović, Nada (2001). NDH i Italija: političke veze i diplomatski odnosi [The NDH and Italy: Political Connections and Diplomatic Relations] (in Croatian). Naklada Ljevak. ISBN 9789531784603.
- Milazzo, Matteo J. (1975). The Chetnik Movement & the Yugoslav Resistance. Johns Hopkins University Press. ISBN 0-8018-1589-4.
- Obhođaš, Amir; Werhas, Mario; Dimitrijević, Bojan; Despot, Zvonimir (2013). Ustaška vojnica 1 [Ustaše Militia 1] (in Croatian). Zagreb: Despot Infinitus. ISBN 9789537892104.
- Obhođaš, Amir; Werhas, Mario; Dimitrijević, Bojan; Despot, Zvonimir (2013). Ustaška vojnica 2 [Ustaše Militia 2] (in Croatian). Zagreb: Despot Infinitus. ISBN 978-953-7892-17-3.
- Pavlowitch, Stevan K. (2008). Hitler's New Disorder: The Second World War in Yugoslavia. New York: Columbia University Press. ISBN 978-1-85065-895-5.
- Ramet, Sabrina P. (2006). The Three Yugoslavias: State-Building and Legitimation, 1918–2005. New York: Indiana University Press. ISBN 0-253-34656-8.
- Roberts, Walter R. (1973). Tito, Mihailović and the Allies 1941–1945. Rutgers University Press. ISBN 0822307731.
- Tomasevich, Jozo (1975). War and Revolution in Yugoslavia, 1941–1945: The Chetniks. Vol. 1. San Francisco: Stanford University Press. ISBN 0-8047-0857-6.
- Tomasevich, Jozo (2001). War and Revolution in Yugoslavia, 1941–1945: Occupation and Collaboration. Vol. 2. San Francisco: Stanford University Press. ISBN 0-8047-3615-4.
- Aarons, Mark and Loftus, John: Unholy Trinity: How the Vatican's Nazi Networks Betrayed Western Intelligence to the Soviets. New York: St. Martin's Press, 1992. 372 pages. ISBN 0-312-07111-6.
- Fischer, Bernd J. (2007). Balkan Strongmen: Dictators and Authoritarian Rulers of South-Eastern Europe. Purdue University Press. ISBN 978-1-55753-455-2.
- Hermann Neubacher: Sonderauftrag Suedost 1940–1945, Bericht eines fliegendes Diplomaten, 2. durchgesehene Auflage, Goettingen, 1956.
- Ladislaus Hory and Martin Broszat. Der Kroatische Ustascha-Staat, 1941–1945. Stuttgart, 1964.
- Thomas, N., K. Mikulan, and C. Pavelic. Axis Forces in Yugoslavia 1941–45. London: Osprey, 1995. ISBN 1-85532-473-3.
- Encyclopedia of the Holocaust, Israel Gutman editor-in-chief, Vol. 4, Ustase entry. Macmillan, 1990.
- Aleksa Djilas. The contested country: Yugoslav unity and communist revolution, 1919–1953. Harvard University Press, 1991.
- "Independent State of Croatia laws on Croatian - Zakonske osnove progona politickih protivnika i rasno nepodobnih u NDH" (PDF). Archived from the original (PDF) on 2007-09-29.
