= Operation Trio =

Axis military operation of World War II

- Part of World War II in Yugoslavia
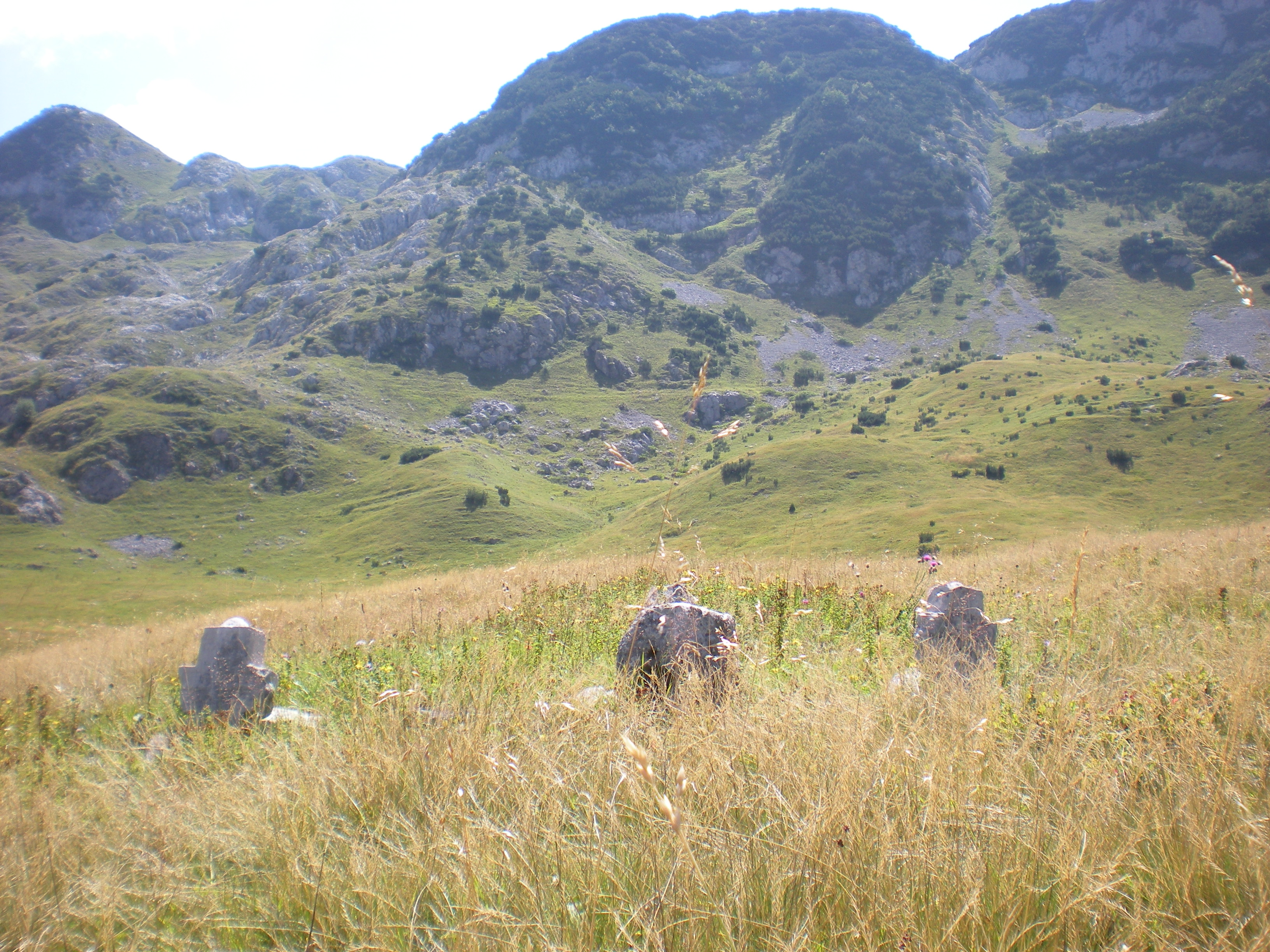
- Tito and the main force of the Partisans withdrew into the Zelengora ("green mountain") mountains to escape the Axis offensive
| Date | 20 April – 13 May 1942 |
| Location | Eastern Bosnia 43.8°N 19°E |
| Result | See the Aftermath section |

Belligerents
| Germany; Italy; (Independent State of Croatia) NDH; Chetniks (Sandžak) | Chetniks (East Bosnian) | (Yugoslav Partisans) Partisans |

Commanders and leaders
| (Nazi Germany) Paul Bader; (Fascist Italy) Mario Roatta; (Independent State of Croatia) Jure Francetić | (Chetniks) Stevan Botić; (Chetniks) Dragoslav Račić; (Chetniks) Milorad Momčilović | (Yugoslav Partisans) Josip Broz Tito; (Yugoslav Partisans) Konstantin Popović |

Units involved
| (Nazi Germany) 718th Infantry Division; (Fascist Italy) 22nd Infantry Division; (Fascist Italy) 1st Alpine Division; (Fascist Italy) 5th Alpine Division; (Independent State of Croatia) 3 Black Legion battalions; (Independent State of Croatia) 25 Croatian Home Guard battalions; Sandžak Chetniks | Unknown | (Yugoslav Partisans) 1st Proletarian Brigade; (Yugoslav Partisans) 2nd Proletarian Brigade; (Yugoslav Partisans) 1st East Bosnian Shock Battalion; (Yugoslav Partisans) 2nd East Bosnian Shock Battalion; (Yugoslav Partisans) East Bosnian Partisan detachments |

Strength
| | Around 4,000 men | |

Casualties and losses
| (Nazi Germany) 11 killed 15 wounded 1 missing (Fascist Italy) 220 killed 556 wounded 173 missing (Independent State of Croatia) 82 killed 149 wounded 121 missing Unknown number of Sandžak Chetniks | 74 killed 102 wounded 3 missing | 1,646 killed 719 wounded 2,626 captured (259 executed) many defected to Chetniks |

Operation Trio (Serbo-Croatian Latin: Operacija Trio) was the first large-scale joint German-Italian counter-insurgency operation of World War II conducted in the Independent State of Croatia (NDH), which included modern-day Bosnia and Herzegovina. It was carried out in two phases within eastern Bosnia from 20 April to 13 May 1942, with Ustaše militia and Croatian Home Guard forces taking part on the Axis side. The aim of the operation was to target all insurgents between Sarajevo and the Drina river in eastern Bosnia. These included the communist-led Yugoslav Partisans and Serb nationalist Chetniks. Differentiating between the rank and file of the two insurgent factions was difficult, as even the communist-led insurgent groups consisted mainly of Serb peasants who had little understanding of the political aims of their leaders.

Operation Trio consisted of two parts, Trio I and Trio II. Together they comprised one element of the Axis effort known as the Third Enemy Offensive (Serbo-Croatian Latin: Treća neprijateljska ofenziva) in post-war Yugoslav historiography. The joint Italian-Chetnik offensive in Montenegro and eastern Herzegovina formed the other element. The Third Enemy Offensive forms part of the Seven Enemy Offensives framework in Yugoslav historiography.

The operation was of limited effectiveness due to several factors, including preemptive action by the Ustaše militia and Italian delays. The area of operations straddled the demarcation line between the German and Italian zones of occupation within the NDH, which led to mutual suspicion and lack of coordination. Both insurgent factions avoided fighting the Axis and NDH forces, instead focusing on fighting each other. After Operation Trio, the Partisan leader Josip Broz Tito, his Supreme Headquarters and the Partisan main force, consisting of the 1st and 2nd proletarian brigades, withdrew from their base of operations around Foča. After briefly reorganising around Zelengora mountain south-east of Foča, they moved their operations to western Bosnia for the remainder of 1942.

Operation Trio coincided with and contributed to the polarisation of the almost exclusively Serb rebels in eastern Bosnia into two groups: the Serb-chauvinist Chetniks and the multi-ethnic and communist-led Partisans. Encouraged by Chetnik propaganda against Croats and Bosnian Muslims and repelled by the sectarian left-wing policies and actions of the communists, many Serb peasant fighters were swayed to the Chetnik cause. Violent coups occurred against the communist leadership of all but one of the Partisan detachments in eastern Bosnia, and these detachments effectively defected to the Chetniks. Most of the surviving communist fighters from these detachments rejoined the Partisan forces, and many withdrew with Tito to western Bosnia during the Partisan Long March. Within a few weeks of the end of Operation Trio only 600 Partisan fighters were left in eastern Bosnia, comprising the Group of Shock Battalions and the Birač Partisan Detachment. All these forces sought refuge in the Birač region. The Chetnik movement in eastern Bosnia, at best a confederacy of local warlords, was strengthened by mass defections from the Partisans. For a time they ruled large parts of the region, after making accommodations with the Ustaše regime in May and June 1942.

== Background ==
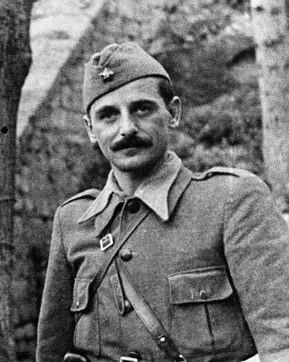
Koča Popović commanded the Partisan 1st Proletarian Brigade during Operation Trio

=== Foča Republic ===
During Operation Southeast Croatia, Josip Broz Tito, his Supreme Headquarters and the 1st Proletarian Brigade commanded by Spanish Civil War veteran Konstantin "Koča" Popović, had withdrawn south to Foča, on the boundary between eastern Bosnia and Herzegovina. With the help of Montenegrin Partisans, they established a liberated area around Foča and Goražde. This area, known as the "Foča Republic", was expanded by subsequent military operations. By late March, People's Liberation Councils had been established to govern 10 towns and 92 villages in the liberated area, but communist organisation in the area was limited and of poor quality.

=== Insurgent forces ===
At the end of 1941, there were six Partisan detachments in eastern Bosnia, with about 7,300 fighters operating in the Majevica, Ozren, Birač, Romanija, Zvijezda and Kalinovik areas. In January 1942, the Romanija detachment had borne the brunt of Operation Southeast Croatia and had been effectively destroyed. Many Partisan fighters were Serb peasants who took to the forests and mountains to defend their families and villages against the Ustaše; few were ideologically committed to the Partisan cause. The Chetnik forces in eastern Bosnia had not opposed the Axis offensive. Many had withdrawn across the Drina river into the Territory of the Military Commander in Serbia to avoid engagement with German and NDH forces.

Both the Partisan Supreme Headquarters and the Partisan General Staff of Bosnia-Herzegovina were based in the area of operations, with Tito's supreme headquarters directly controlling the 1st Proletarian Brigade, and the general staff, commanded by Svetozar Vukmanović-Tempo, controlling the Partisan detachments in East Bosnia under the overall direction of the supreme headquarters.

In early January 1942, the Partisan Supreme Headquarters decided to permit fighters who were not willing to formally become Partisans to fight alongside Partisan units. These "volunteer detachments" were under the control of the supreme headquarters of the renamed People's Liberation Partisan and Volunteer Army of Yugoslavia, and were established from former Chetnik-aligned fighters as the Jahorina, Foča, Vlasenica, Srebrenica and Krajina volunteer detachments. The Krajina Volunteer Detachment consisted of refugees from that region who had fled to German-occupied Serbia to escape the Ustaše terror. Volunteer battalions and companies were also placed under the staff of the original Partisan detachments, with many of them absorbed as whole units with the addition of a communist cadre. Some volunteer detachments fought under their own leaders, and all volunteer detachments fought under the Serbian tri-colour flag.

In February 1942, Major Jezdimir Dangić and other former Royal Yugoslav Army officers (many of whom had allegiance to the Serbian puppet regime of Milan Nedić or Draža Mihailović) entered eastern Bosnia from occupied Serbia, where some of them had withdrawn to avoid Operation Southeast Croatia. They started to re-form Chetnik units in eastern Bosnia and began agitating against the Partisans on a "conservative, Serb-nationalist and anti-Muslim basis". Other Chetnik units crossed into eastern Bosnia from occupied Serbia and attacked the Partisans. They included the "Chetnik Proletarian Shock Brigade", a unit of 200 fighters under Captain Dragoslav Račić, and another group under Captain Milorad Momčilović.

The Partisan forces in eastern Bosnia and Herzegovina initially consisted almost entirely of Serb peasants, and this made much of the rank and file of both Partisan and volunteer detachments highly susceptible to pro-Chetnik agitation, accommodations with Chetnik forces in the local area and hostility towards non-Serbs. The Partisan moves towards multi-ethnic recruiting, imposition of extreme left-wing policies and use of terror against "class enemies" made all the Partisan and volunteer detachments vulnerable to such agitation. Chetnik infiltrators were able to join detachments and turn the rank and file against their communist cadres. An example of this occurred in the Majevica Partisan Detachment on 20 February, when the communist staff were massacred by Chetniks at Vukosavci near Lopare.

The 2nd Proletarian Brigade was formed at Čajniče on 1 March from Partisan forces that had withdrawn from occupied Serbia after Operation Uzice. In early March the Partisans began collecting the most loyal fighters from each Partisan detachment into "shock companies" and established structures for the development of "shock battalions" and "shock brigades". At the same time, Partisan forces that had been dispersed by Operation Southeast Croatia were threatening the Tuzla-Doboj railway line. In mid-March the 1st East Bosnian Shock Battalion was established at Srednje (outside Sarajevo), and by the end of the month the 2nd East Bosnian Shock Battalion had been established in Drinjača (near Zvornik); it incorporated the remaining 240 fighters of the Majevica Partisan Detachment.

The concentration of the most reliable fighters into proletarian brigades, shock battalions and shock companies weakened the integrity of the four remaining Partisan detachments in eastern Bosnia, but enabled the Partisan Supreme Headquarters to concentrate its best forces in mobile units to undertake successful offensive operations against the Chetniks. They captured several towns in March, including Vlasenica and Srebrenica. Partisan operations were threatening the railway network throughout eastern Bosnia, including around Sarajevo, by the end of March. Many Bosnian Chetniks deserted to the Partisans, often joining as complete units under their previous Chetnik commanders. These former Chetnik units became units of the "Volunteer Army", which reached a strength of around 7,000–8,000 fighters by the end of March. Their loyalty and military value to the Partisans was very limited.

On 25 March the Partisan General Staff of Serbia advised the Partisan Supreme Headquarters that the Serbian Partisan movement had been "extinguished", largely as a result of Operation Uzice and subsequent operations by the German occupation forces and their Serb collaborators. This was a significant setback for the Partisan cause, as Tito had always considered that a return to Serbia was a necessary ingredient for a successful revolution.

== Planning ==
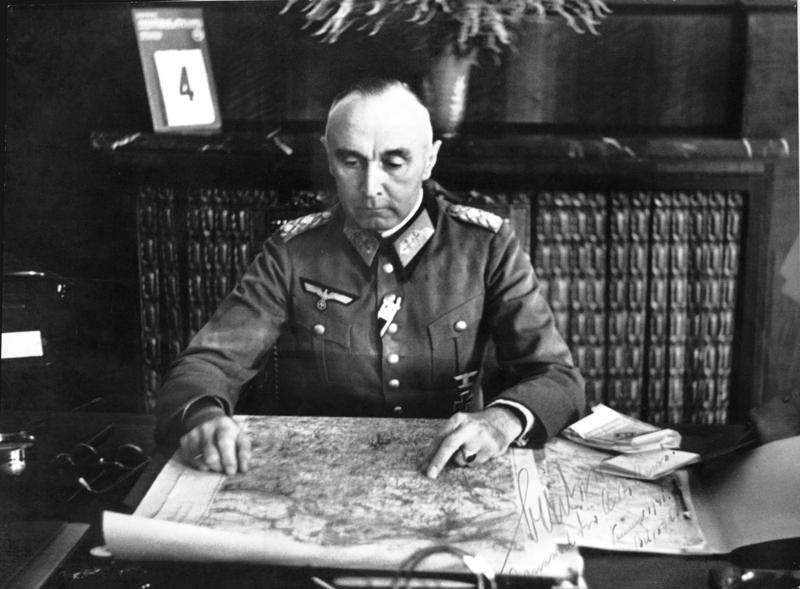
General der Artillerie Paul Bader was the Axis tactical commander of Operation Trio

Planning for Operation Trio and the associated Operation West-Bosnien in the Bosanska Krajina occurred during two Axis conferences in March 1942. During the initial conference at Opatija on 2–3 March, the NDH Chief of the General Staff Vladimir Laxa objected to an Italian proposal to involve the Bosnian and Herzegovinian Chetniks in the planned operations, and with the support of the Germans, this idea was initially shelved. Operation Trio was to be one of a series of counter-insurgency operations planned for eastern Bosnia, Herzegovina, Sandžak, Montenegro, western Bosnia and Lika. Despite this, the only operations that were actually conducted between March and June 1942 were Operation Trio, and a combined Italian-Montenegrin Chetnik offensive in Montenegro and eastern Herzegovina which is also associated with the Third Enemy Offensive in Yugoslav historiography.

Detailed planning and orders for Operation Trio were finalised at a conference in Ljubljana on 28–29 March 1942. Laxa, General Mario Roatta (the commander of the Italian Second Army), and General der Artillerie Paul Bader (the commander of German forces in the NDH) negotiated a compromise permitting temporary non-political agreements to be concluded with the Herzegovinian Chetniks, led by Dobroslav Jevđević, but not with any of the Bosnian Chetnik groups, whose leaders were Petar Baćović in the area of Foča and Jezdimir Dangić, who was aligned with the Serb collaborationist Milan Nedić.

Significant delays in finalising arrangements for Operation Trio were caused by disagreements regarding where it would commence, who would be in command, the involvement of Chetniks and NDH forces, how to deal with the demarcation line between the German and Italian zones of occupation, and what local authorities would be put in place as localities were cleared of insurgents. The NDH contributed to the mutual suspicion between the Germans and Italians. The Italian demands prevailed, because they were committing larger forces to the operation. The decision was ultimately made to target all insurgents in eastern Bosnia between Sarajevo and the Drina. Throughout the preparation for Operation Trio, the Italians looked for opportunities to cross over the demarcation line and expand their sphere of influence into eastern Bosnia to take advantage of German weakness in the NDH. Bader's final orders for the operation granted several key Italian demands, including military control over civil affairs in the area of operations, fair treatment of the local population, and treating non-resisting Chetniks as prisoners of war.

Bader was named tactical commander of the combined forces (known as Kampfgruppe Bader) committed to Operation Trio, but to appease the Italians the force was formally under the overall command of the Italian Second Army, commanded by Roatta. Kampfgruppe Bader consisted of the 718th Infantry Division (the only German division stationed in the NDH at the time), the Italian 22nd Infantry Division, 1st Alpine Division, 5th Alpine Division and 28 NDH battalions. Since 18 February, the 718th Infantry Division had been responsible for an area of operations bounded by the Sava and Bosna in the north, the Drina to the east and the German-Italian demarcation line to the south. Mainly because of lack of transport and firepower, the division had only conducted limited offensive operations against the Partisans between mid-February and mid-April.

The original planned start date of 15 April was pushed back when the Italians had problems moving to their start positions and later had trouble providing transport to establish lines of communication across the Adriatic. The operation was rescheduled to 25 April. Prior to the Ljubljana conference, the Ustaše authorities were concerned about negotiations between the German and Italian commanders and Dangić, and were particularly worried that the Germans would permit the Italians and Chetniks to use Sarajevo as a base. On 31 March the commander of the Ustaše Black Legion, Jure Francetić, launched a pre-emptive offensive primarily against Dangić's Chetniks. Francetić captured Vlasenica, Bratunac and Srebrenica, meeting limited resistance from the Partisans, and then scattered the more numerous Chetniks while inflicting significant losses.

In early April, Dangić travelled to Belgrade for discussions with representatives of Nedić and Chetnik leaders. He was arrested by the German authorities and sent to a prisoner-of-war camp in occupied Poland. Dangić was replaced by Stevan Botić. On 15 April 1942 the Wehrmacht commander in south-east Europe, Generalfeldmarschall (Field Marshal) Wilhelm List, issued an order forbidding Wehrmacht units to negotiate with any rebel groups. Only Abwehr (military intelligence) and police units were to maintain surveillance of such groups through informants and undercover agents.

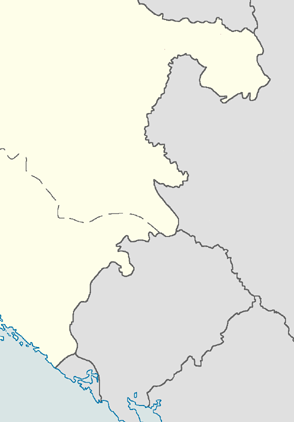
Map of the eastern NDH with the demarcation line (dashed) between the Italian (southwest) and German (northeast) zones. Towns captured by German and NDH forces during Operation Trio are in red, and the Partisan detachments in eastern Bosnia at the end of 1941 are in blue. Foča and Goražde are in green.

After several months of increasing tension between the factions struggling for power within the insurgency, the first of the pro-Chetnik coups occurred, in the Ozren Partisan Detachment. It was sparked by the arrest and execution on 18 April of pro-Chetnik agitator Bogdan Jovićić by Vukmanović-Tempo and the newly formed 1st East Bosnian Shock Battalion. Fighting ensued between pro-Chetnik members of the detachment and the shock battalion. Vukmanović-Tempo then abandoned the Ozren Partisan Detachment, taking the detachment staff and remaining loyal Partisans with him.

== Operation ==
On 18 April, Bader informed Roatta of the need to take action immediately to relieve the besieged Croatian garrison at Rogatica, and by 20 April was advising his superiors that the joint German-Italian operation had miscarried due to Italian inaction. In the wake of Francetić's offensive, the Germans pre-emptively moved to clear the area north of the demarcation line before the formal start of the operation. This advance towards the Drina from 20 to 30 April, coordinated with NDH forces, was the first phase of Operation Trio (Trio I). The 718th Infantry Division advanced from assembly areas in Sarajevo, Olovo and Tuzla, with the aim of relieving Rogatica and clearing the surrounding area of Partisans. The fighting became very confused, with the Chetniks, who were under attack from the Black Legion, avoiding the German units, who went past them to attack the Partisans. The Partisan main force avoided fighting the Black Legion, instead attacking the Chetniks from the rear while they were engaged against Francetić's troops. The Italian 5th Alpine Division Pusteria utilised Chetnik troops from the Sandžak as auxiliaries during their advance on Čajniče which coincided with the German-NDH advance towards the Drina. Rogatica was relieved without fighting on 27 April, and the combined force reached the Drina three days later.

More pro-Chetnik coups occurred in the second half of April. The first was in one of the remaining battalions of the Romanija Partisan Detachment, followed by all three battalions of the Zvijezda Partisan Detachment. The political commissars of every company were killed. By the start of May, coups had also occurred in battalions of the Kalinovik Partisan Detachment and the Foča Volunteer Detachment.

On 8–9 May 1942, another pro-Chetnik coup occurred in the recently created Zenica Partisan Detachment, and about 30 communists and their supporters were killed. About 100 remaining Partisan fighters from the Ozren and Zenica detachments were incorporated into the 3rd East Bosnian Shock Battalion.

The Italians believed the German-NDH preliminary operation had been designed to avoid the need to involve the Italians in clearing eastern Bosnia, thereby preventing them from expanding their sphere of influence. The second phase of the operation (known as Trio II or "Operation Foča") commenced on 7 May, and was a fairly minor joint operation to capture Foča and Kalinovik, but by then the Partisan Supreme Headquarters and main force had already evacuated Foča, which was captured on 10 May. After Italian complaints and political manoeuvrings, Roatta took over direct control of the operation on that day, but the fighting was already over. Despite their attempts to avoid fighting, the Partisans suffered significant losses.

== Aftermath ==
After clearing the larger towns of the Birač region of Partisans and Chetniks, the Black Legion committed large-scale atrocities against Serbs and Jews in the region, including massacring about 890 people from Vlasenica after raping the women and girls.

Along with the three East Bosnian shock battalions, the Partisan General Staff of Bosnia-Herzegovina first attempted to cross the Bosna to follow the Partisan Supreme Headquarters and main force to western Bosnia, but instead retreated to Birač, where they joined forces with the Birač Detachment at the end of May. The Birač Partisan Detachment was the only Partisan or volunteer detachment in East Bosnia not to suffer a pro-Chetnik coup in March–May 1942. By June–July 1942, the Partisans in eastern Bosnia had been reduced to a strength of around 600 fighters.

In mid-May, Operation Trio was followed by the joint Italian-Chetnik offensive against Partisan detachments within the Italian zone of occupation in eastern Herzegovina and Montenegro, with similar effects: the Partisans lost almost all of the liberated territory in these areas. This offensive is also considered part of the Third Enemy Offensive in Yugoslav historiography. After Operation Trio, NDH forces remained south of the demarcation line between the German and Italian zones of occupation, in spite of protests from the Italians.

After Operation Trio and the joint Italian-Chetnik offensive, the Partisans formed three more proletarian brigades, consisting mainly of Montenegrins. Operation Trio contributed to the decision of the Partisan Supreme Headquarters to withdraw to western Bosnia in the Partisan Long March, which commenced in late June 1942.

While incurring significant casualties fighting the Black Legion, the Chetnik movement in eastern Bosnia benefited from the mass desertion of Partisans and the many pro-Chetnik coups in Partisan and volunteer detachments. Despite their lack of unity, the Chetnik movement thrived in eastern Bosnia for the remainder of 1942 because some Chetnik leaders made accommodations with the Ustaše regime and as many Chetniks and Partisans were unwilling to kill fellow Bosnian Serbs of the opposing faction.

== See also ==
- Anti-partisan operations in World War II
- Resistance during World War II
