= Operation Southeast Croatia =

Axis military operation in World War II

Coordinates: 44.11°N 18.88°E

- Part of World War II in Yugoslavia
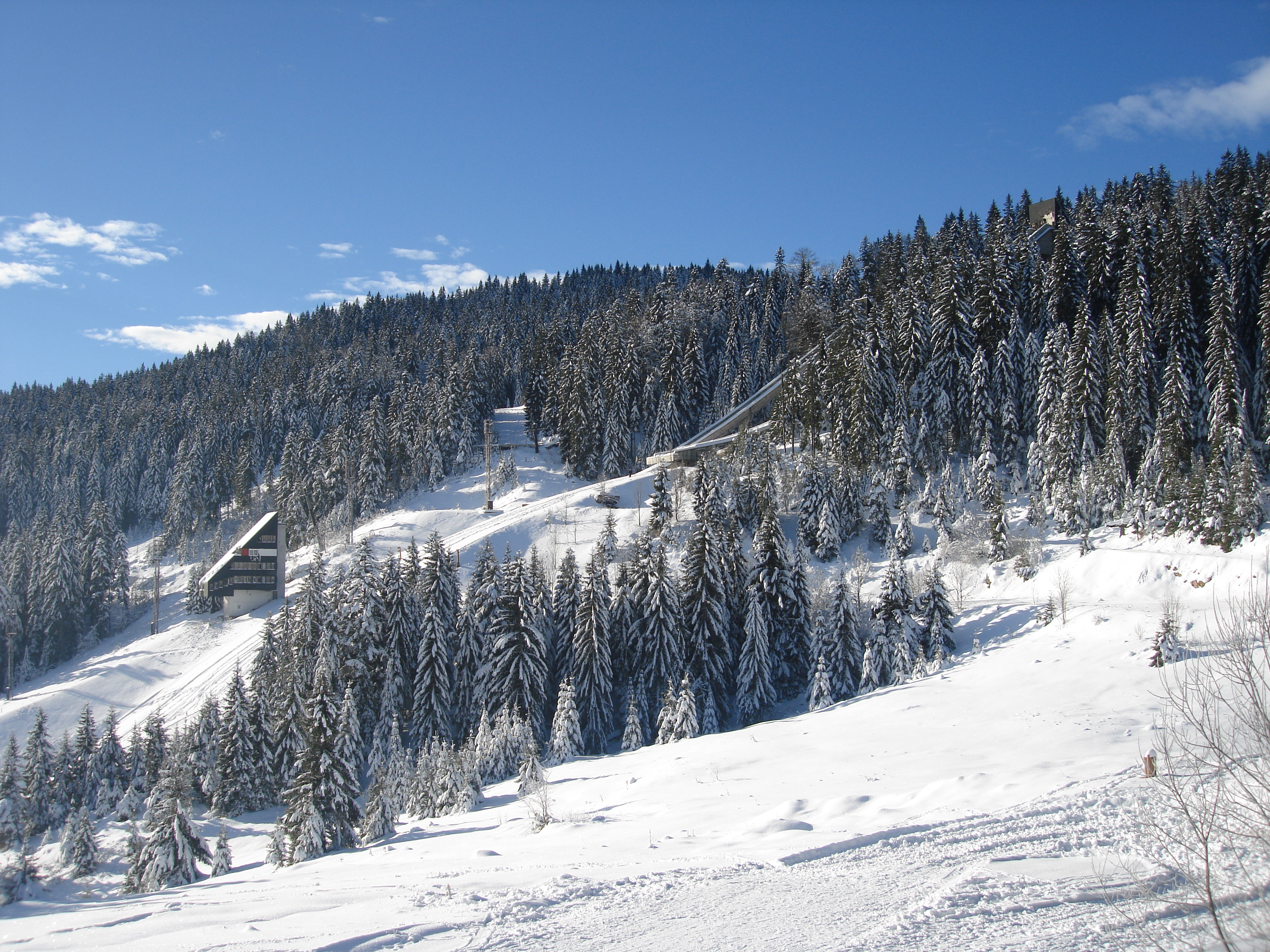
- The Mount Igman plateau that the 1st Proletarian Brigade crossed to escape destruction
Date	15–23 January 1942
Location	Eastern Bosnia
Result	Partisan withdrawal

Belligerents
Germany; Independent State of Croatia (NDH); Italy	Partisans

Commanders and leaders
Germany: Paul Bader; Paul Hoffman; Johann Fortner	Partisans: Josip Broz Tito; Koča Popović; Slaviša Vajner †

Units involved
Germany: 342nd Infantry Division; 718th Infantry Division; Luftwaffe support; NDH: seven Croatian Home Guard battalions; nine Croatian Home Guard artillery batteries; ZNDH support; Italy: one Alpini battalion	1st Proletarian Brigade; Romanija, Zvijezda, Birač and Ozren Partisan Detachments

Strength
30,000–35,000 troops	8,000 troops

Casualties and losses
Germany: 25 dead; 131 wounded; 1 missing; c. 300 cases of frostbite; NDH: 50 dead and seriously wounded	521 dead; 1,331–1,400 captured; 172 cases of frostbite

Operation Southeast Croatia (German: Unternehmen Südostkroatien) was a large-scale German-led counter-insurgency operation conducted in the southeastern parts of the Independent State of Croatia (Croatian: Nezavisna Država Hrvatska, NDH; modern-day Bosnia and Herzegovina) during World War II. It was the first of two German-led operations targeting mainly Yugoslav Partisans in eastern Bosnia between 15 January and 4 February 1942. Several days after the conclusion of Operation Southeast Croatia, a follow-up operation known as Operation Ozren was carried out between the Bosna and Spreča rivers. Both operations also involved Croatian Home Guard and Italian troops and are associated with what is known as the Second Enemy Offensive (Serbo-Croatian Latin: Druga neprijateljska ofenziva) in post-war Yugoslav historiography. The Second Enemy Offensive forms part of the Seven Enemy Offensives framework in Yugoslav historiography.

The insurgents in the area of operations included some groups of the communist-led Partisans and some of Serb–chauvinist Chetniks. Although the Partisans and Chetniks had already irrevocably split in the German-occupied territory of Serbia following Operation Uzice in late 1941, this had not yet happened in eastern Bosnia, and in some areas they were still cooperating. As a result, differentiating between the rank and file of the two groups was difficult, as even the communist-led insurgent groups consisted mainly of Serb peasants who had little understanding of the political aims of their leaders. While there were 20,000 Chetnik insurgents located within the area of operations, they offered no resistance to the German–NDH forces and many withdrew east across the Drina river to avoid being engaged. This contributed to the complete unravelling of Chetnik–Partisan cooperation in eastern Bosnia. The Partisan main force was able to evade the Germans, infiltrate through the Italian cordon to the south and establish itself around Foča.

The failure of the Axis forces to decisively engage the Partisans during these operations necessitated a further major offensive, Operation Trio, in the area immediately south of where Operations Southeast Croatia and Ozren had taken place.

== Background ==
On 6 April 1941 the Axis powers invaded Yugoslavia from multiple directions, rapidly overwhelming the under-prepared Royal Yugoslav Army which capitulated 11 days later. In the aftermath of the invasion Yugoslavia was partitioned between the Axis powers through a combination of annexations and occupation zones. In addition, an Axis puppet state known as the Independent State of Croatia (Serbo-Croatian: Nezavisna Država Hrvatska, NDH) was established on the territory of modern-day Croatia and Bosnia and Herzegovina. The NDH was divided by a German–Italian demarcation line, known as the "Vienna Line", with the Germans occupying the north and northeastern parts of the NDH, and the Italians the south and southwestern sections. The NDH immediately implemented genocidal policies against the Serb, Jewish and Romani population of the puppet state. Armed resistance to the occupation and the NDH itself initially formed into two loosely cooperating factions, the Partisans who were led by communists, and the Chetniks who were mostly led by Serb–chauvinist officers of the defeated Royal Yugoslav Army. In November and December 1941, almost all Partisan forces in the German-occupied territory of Serbia had been forced to withdraw into eastern Bosnia where they combined with local Partisan forces, mainly consisting of Serb peasants. Most of the Chetnik forces in eastern Bosnia were also local Serb peasants. The insurgency in eastern Bosnia meant that NDH authorities were unable to retain control of the region.

At the end of 1941, there were six Partisan detachments in eastern Bosnia, with about 7,300 fighters operating in the Majevica, Ozren, Birač, Romanija, Zvijezda and Kalinovik areas. According to Enver Redžić, in early January 1942, the Chetniks controlled a large portion of eastern Bosnia, including the towns of Zvornik, Višegrad, Vlasenica, Srebrenica, Drinjača, Bratunac, Foča, Ustikolina, Goražde and Čajniče. Due to continuing cooperation between the two groups, the Chetniks also shared control of the towns of Rogatica, Olovo and Han Pijesak with the Partisans.

== Planning ==
The orders from General der Artillerie (Lieutenant General) Paul Bader, the German Military Commander in Serbia who also had responsibility for operational matters in the NDH, directed that Operation Southeast Croatia was to be an encirclement operation. All persons encountered within the area of operations were to be treated as the enemy. The population within the area to be targeted by the operation were almost all either Orthodox Serbs or Bosnian Muslims, although there was a small Catholic Croat minority. Bader believed that the Partisans and Chetniks were using the area as winter quarters, and that their presence there was a threat to major transport routes through eastern Bosnia. Time was a factor, as the 342nd Infantry Division was only available until 31 January, after which it was being withdrawn and sent to the Eastern Front.

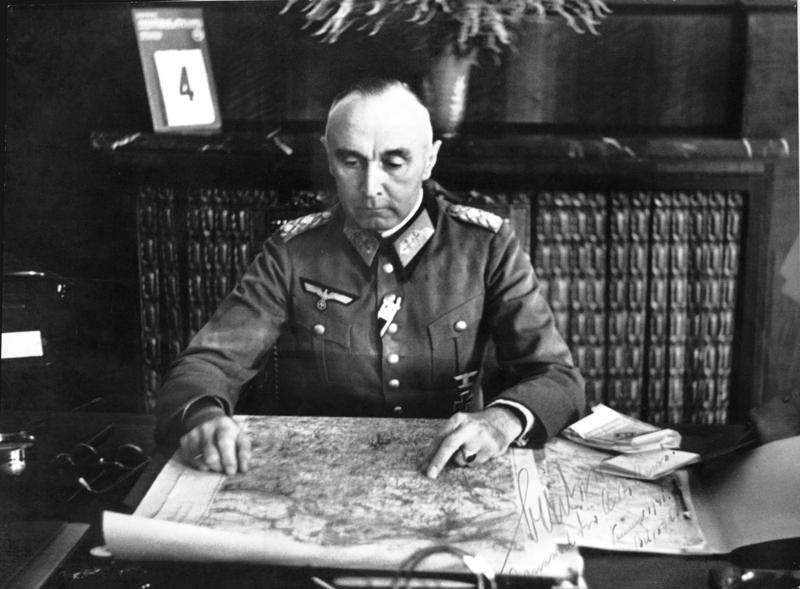
General der Artillerie Paul Bader was the overall commander of Operations Southeast Croatia and Ozren

The operation itself was led by the German 342nd Infantry Division, which had been relieved of its occupation duties in the occupied territory of Serbia by Bulgarian troops. The commander of the 342nd Infantry Division, Generalmajor (Brigadier General) Paul Hoffman, also had the 718th Infantry Division of Generalmajor Johann Fortner under his command for the duration of the operation. The German force was assisted by Croatian Home Guard units including seven infantry battalions and nine artillery batteries. The Axis forces available for the operation were 30,000–35,000 troops in total. Luftwaffe support included reconnaissance aircraft and a combat squadron. The offensive targeted areas held by the Romanija, Zvijezda, Birač, and Ozren Partisan detachments, between Sarajevo, Tuzla, Zvornik and Višegrad. To the south, along the "Vienna Line" separating the German-occupied zone of the NDH from the Italian-occupied zone, the Italians placed a cordon. In total, the area targeted by the operation was estimated by the Germans to contain around 8,000 Partisans and 20,000 Bosnian Chetniks.

On 9 January 1942, the 718th Infantry Division issued orders to both its regiments that defined the following groups as hostile: all non-residents and residents that had been absent from their localities until recently; all identifiable Chetniks or communists with or without weapons or ammunition; and anyone concealing, supplying or providing information to those groups. Any captured Partisans were to be briefly interrogated and summarily shot, as were any other insurgents that had attacked the Germans, been caught carrying ammunition or messages, or who resisted or fled. Also, any houses from which shots were fired at German troops were to be burned.

=== 15–18 January ===
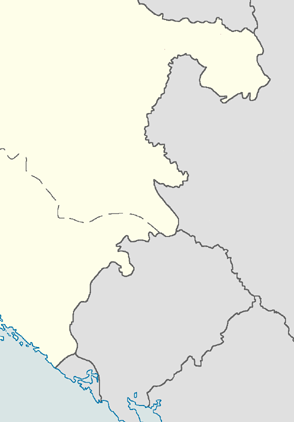
Map of the eastern areas of the Independent State of Croatia showing assembly areas (blue) and initial objectives (red) of Axis forces

Operation Southeast Croatia commenced on 15 January 1942. The 342nd Infantry Division approached the area of operations from the Drina River valley to the east, with the 718th Infantry Division pushing east from assembly areas in Sarajevo and Tuzla.

In the first days of the operation, the 697th Regiment of the 342nd Infantry Division, supported by the Croatian 3rd Home Guard Regiment and four batteries of artillery, thrust out of their bridgehead over the Drina at Zvornik and cleared the high ground southwest and south of that town, and south along the Drina valley road, hindered by roadblocks and destroyed bridges. It then followed up the retreating insurgents, mopping up the Drinjača River valley, before pushing southwest through the mountains and reaching Vlasenica on 18 January. Parts of the 698th Regiment of the 342nd Infantry Division fought southwest from Višegrad along the upper Drina valley to Međeđa, while other elements pushed west towards Rogatica, reinforced by an Italian Alpini battalion from the 5th Alpine Division Pusteria. The 699th Regiment of the 342nd Infantry Division, reinforced by I. Battalion of the 202nd Panzer Regiment, advanced along the Drina valley past the confluence with the Drinjača to the area west of Ljubovija, clearing roadblocks as they went. In the area of Milići, they captured about 400 insurgents, mostly Chetniks loyal to Jezdimir Dangić, along with a tank, two machine guns, about 160 rifles and a large amount of ammunition. The regiment then mopped up the area west to Vlasenica and one battalion cleared the route to Srebrenica.

The 738th Regiment of the 718th Infantry Division (less its II. Battalion) was reinforced by two battalions of the Croatian 13th Home Guard Regiment, pioneers, four NDH artillery batteries and two-and-a-half German mountain gun batteries. It pushed east from Sarajevo along the Prača valley then through the Romanija mountains towards Rogatica. Fighting in very difficult terrain, it captured 240 insurgents and significant amounts of weapons and ammunition. It also freed 10 Italian and 57 NDH soldiers. The other regiment of the 718th Infantry Division, the 750th Regiment, was reinforced by a German artillery battery, I. Battalion of the Croatian Home Guard Regiment and a Croatian Home Guard mountain battery. It moved south from an assembly area southwest of Tuzla towards Olovo. It reached Kladanj on 16 January, and spent the following days clearing both sides of the road west towards Vlasenica. It had been planned that the Italian 3rd Mountain Infantry Division Ravenna would provide a cordon to the south, blocking any southerly withdrawal by the insurgents. This did not occur, as the Italians claimed the railroad near Mostar had been damaged, resulting in several weeks delay. A scratch force, consisting of two battalions of Croatian border guards, II. Battalion of the Croatian 7th Home Guard Regiment, and one battalion of Ustaše Militia, was deployed along the line Vijaka–Vareš–Visoko to prevent insurgents from crossing the Bosna River.

When the local leaders appointed by overall Chetnik leader Draža Mihailović, Majors Boško Todorović and Dangić, became aware of the commencement of Operation Southeast Croatia, they advised other Chetnik commanders that the operation was targeted at the Partisans, and there was no need for the Chetniks to get involved. Following this, their units withdrew from their positions on the front line, let the Germans pass through their areas, or went home. Many withdrew across the Drina into the German-occupied territory of Serbia to avoid being engaged, which severely weakened the Partisan positions with the result that they suffered significant casualties and lost a great deal of territory. These actions severed any remaining cooperative links that remained between the Chetniks and Partisans in eastern Bosnia.

The insurgents in the area of operations destroyed villages to deny supplies and shelter to the Germans who were operating in mountainous terrain with snow up to one metre (3.3 ft) deep and facing extreme temperatures approaching −30 °C (−22 °F). The Partisans proved very difficult to pin down, aided by excellent communication and supported by the local populace. During the operation, the decisive engagements with the Partisans were mainly in the Romanija region. The Romanija Detachment made up forty percent of all Partisans in eastern Bosnia and bore the brunt of most of the fighting during the operation.

=== 19–23 January ===
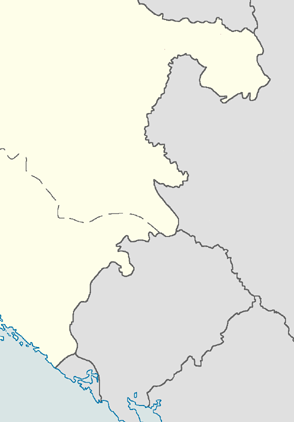
Map of the eastern areas of the Independent State of Croatia showing towns captured during Operation Southeast Croatia. Mount Igman is also shown, this is where the 1st Proletarian Brigade evaded Axis forces.

After their initial advances, the 342nd Infantry Division spent the next few days mopping up the areas they had entered. The 697th Regiment advanced south from Vlasenica through the Javor Mountains, meeting little resistance and capturing Han Pijesak on 22 January. Elements of the 697th Regiment pushed west towards Olovo the same day. The 698th Regiment cleared the area around Rogatica, killing 50 and capturing 200 insurgents, and liberating 63 captured Croatian Home Guard soldiers. The 699th Regiment patrolled the area as far as Vlasenica and Srebrenica. These mopping up operations achieved little, as most of the insurgents had escaped the encirclement before it was completed.

The 718th Infantry Division was assisted in their subsequent operations by air support from the ZNDH, which bombed Sokolac on 20 January. On 21 January, the 738th Regiment captured the village of Podromanija south of Sokolac, and on the following day elements of the regiment drove through Sokolac and closed on Han Pijesak. On the same day, the 750th Regiment reached Olovo, but the insurgents had withdrawn from the area.

On 21 January, Bader dramatically altered his previous orders regarding the treatment of those encountered in the area of operations, directing that those who did not resist and surrendered or merely had weapons in their houses, were to be treated as prisoners of war. It is likely that this change was intended to assist Chetniks in the area of operations to avoid destruction. By the end of January, Bader's chief of staff was attempting to negotiate a cooperation agreement with Dangić, and in turn Dangić ordered the 4,500–10,000 Chetniks under his command to avoid the Germans or surrender their weapons immediately if they were unable to do so.

After temporarily improving the Partisan defences against the German and NDH forces, the Partisan Supreme Headquarters under Josip Broz Tito and the 1st Proletarian Brigade commanded by Koča Popović were unable to salvage the situation and retreated south towards Foča. The 1st Proletarian Brigade, less two battalions that were accompanying the Supreme Headquarters, crossed the Igman mountain plateau near Sarajevo with temperatures reaching −32 °C (−26 °F). According to Popović, 172 Partisans suffered severe hypothermic injury and six died. When they approached the German-Italian demarcation line south of Sarajevo, the Partisans were able to infiltrate through the weak Italian cordon. Montenegrin Partisans crossed into the NDH to attack the Chetniks, capturing Foča on 20 January and Goražde on 22 January. The German and NDH forces were successful in recapturing Sokolac, Rogatica, Bratunac, Srebrenica, Vlasenica, Han Pijesak, Olovo, Bosansko Petrovo Selo, and some smaller settlements, and inflicted significant losses on the Partisans.

Because the Chetniks failed to assist the Partisans in the battle, the Central Committee of the Communist Party ceased all further attempts to cooperate with them and issued a declaration on 22 January to "Bosnians! Serbs, Muslims, Croats!" that Chetnik leaders Boško Todorović, Aćim Babić, and others were traitors. It further proclaimed that the Partisans fought alone "all across Bosnia and Herzegovina" and ended with "long live the united people's liberation struggle of all the peoples of Bosnia!". The Romanija Detachment's commander, Slaviša Vajner-Čiča, was killed in combat against the Germans. A member of the Supreme Headquarters of the Partisans, Svetozar Vukmanović-Tempo, reported that detachment had completely collapsed.

Faced with overly ambitious objectives and atrocious weather, the combined operation failed to destroy the Partisan forces and was called off on 23 January 1942, with the Germans having suffered casualties of 25 dead, 131 wounded, and one missing, as well as around 300 cases of frostbite. The NDH forces lost 50 soldiers killed or seriously wounded. The Germans captured 855 rifles, 22 machine guns and four artillery pieces, along with livestock and draft animals. The Partisans had lost 531 killed and between 1,331 and 1,400 captured, in addition to the frostbite casualties suffered by the 1st Proletarian Brigade while crossing Mt. Igman. A total of 168 NDH and 104 Italian troops that had been captured by the Partisans were freed during the operation. The Supreme Headquarters entered Foča on 25 January and stayed there for three-and-a-half months.

== Operation Ozren ==
Operation Ozren
- Part of World War II in Yugoslavia
Date	c. 26 January – 4 February 1942
Location	Eastern Bosnia
Result	Partisan withdrawal

Belligerents
Axis: Germany; Independent State of Croatia	Allies: Partisans

Commanders and leaders
(Nazi Germany) Johann Fortner (Independent State of Croatia) Artur Gustović (Independent State of Croatia) Jure Francetić	Josip Broz Tito; Todor Vujasinović

Strength
20,000–30,000 troops five Panzer platoons one armoured train	2,000 troops

Operation Ozren (German: Unternehmen Ozren) was aimed at clearing an estimated 2,000 Partisans from the area between the Bosna and Spreča Rivers, and was effectively an extension of Operation Southeast Croatia employing elements of the force used in that operation. The main force used was Fortner's 718th Infantry Division reinforced by a regiment of the 342nd Infantry Division, supported by a number of NDH units, including a battalion of the Ustaše Black Legion. The force was also supported by five tank platoons and an armoured train. Around 20,000 Axis troops were committed to the operation. It commenced several days after Operation Southeast Croatia ended on 23 January 1942.

The Germans advanced north and west from Kladanj towards a cordon established by ten Croatian Home Guard battalions supported by their own artillery. The Germans believed they had thoroughly sealed off the area, and checked the Croatian cordon every night, but the majority of Partisans were able to evade the cordon and escape by breaking up into small groups and infiltrating through the cordon via seemingly impassable terrain. The Germans also believed that some Partisans merely withdrew into the mountains, concealing their numbers by walking in each other's footprints in the snow, in order to return to the valleys when the Axis forces left. The operation concluded on 4 February 1942.

== Aftermath ==
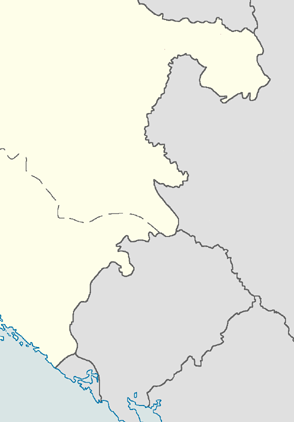
Map of eastern Independent State of Croatia showing areas captured by German and NDH forces (red) and areas captured by the Partisans (blue)

Both operations were hampered by the German need to rely on their Croatian allies as well as the fact that Axis forces were ill-equipped for operations in mountainous terrain during extreme winter conditions. The Croatian units had proven not to be a useful addition to the operation, as they possessed little in the way of fighting power, had little unit cohesion and suffered from serious supply problems.

Operations Southeast Croatia and Ozren were early opportunities for the Germans to learn lessons about the challenges their poorly equipped and often substandard occupation troops faced fighting in the difficult terrain and weather conditions of Bosnia. However, these lessons were to be repeated many more times in the following years as German commanders persisted with their encirclement tactics and unreasonable expectations of what could be achieved in a given time and space.

Following the conclusion of Operations Southeast Croatia and Ozren, German and NDH forces conducted Operation Prijedor in northwest Bosnia. The Germans inflicted considerable losses on the Partisans and captured extensive territory and population centres from them; however, they failed to eliminate them as a military factor and shortly afterwards had to undertake Operation Trio in the region immediately south of the area of operations for Operations Southeast Croatia and Ozren.
