= Seven Enemy Offensives =

Military offensive

The Seven Enemy Offensives (Serbo-Croatian Latin: Sedam neprijateljskih ofanziva) is a group name used in Yugoslav historiography to refer to seven major Axis military operations undertaken during World War II in Yugoslavia against the Yugoslav Partisans.

These seven major offensives were distinct from the day-to-day warfare that went on in every part of the country; and they were distinct, too, from planned operations involving large numbers of troops against isolated regions. The seven offensives were seven different attempts by carefully planned, co-ordinated, and extensive manoeuvres to annihilate the main core of Partisan resistance, i.e. Supreme Headquarters of the National Liberation Army of Yugoslavia under the command of Josip Broz Tito.

== List of operations ==
The Seven Enemy Offensives are:

- The First Enemy Offensive, the attack conducted by the Axis in autumn of 1941 against the "Republic of Užice", a liberated territory the Partisans established in the western region of the Territory of the Military Commander in Serbia. In November 1941, under the codename 'Operation Uzice', German troops attacked and reoccupied this territory, with the majority of Partisan forces escaping towards Bosnia. It was during this offensive that the tenuous collaboration between the Partisans and the royalist Chetniks broke down and turned into open hostility.
- The Second Enemy Offensive, consisted of three consecutive operations conducted by German, Italian and Independent State of Croatia forces, Operation Southeast Croatia and Operation Ozren against Partisan forces in eastern Bosnia, and Operation Prijedor to relieve beleaguered German and Croatian forces in northwest Bosnia. In eastern Bosnia, the Partisan troops avoided encirclement and were forced to retreat over Igman mountain near Sarajevo.
- The Third Enemy Offensive, which consisted of two operations against Partisan forces in eastern Bosnia, Montenegro, Sandžak and Herzegovina which took place in the spring of 1942. These operations were the German-Italian Operation Trio and the Italian-Chetnik Montenegro offensive. The Kozara Offensive, which took place in northwestern Bosnia in the summer of 1942, known as Operation West-Bosnien by the Germans, is sometimes wrongly considered part of the Third Enemy Offensive.
- The Fourth Enemy Offensive, launched by German, Italian, Independent State of Croatia and Chetnik forces, is also known as the Battle of the Neretva or Operation Weiss. The conflict spanning the area between western Bosnia and northern Herzegovina, and culminating in the Partisan retreat over the Neretva river. It took place from January to April, 1943.
- The Fifth Enemy Offensive, also known as the Battle of the Sutjeska or Operation Schwarz, was an attack by German, Italian, Independent State of Croatia and Bulgarian forces, The operation immediately followed the Fourth Offensive and included a complete encirclement of Partisan forces in southeastern Bosnia and northern Montenegro in May and June 1943.
- The Sixth Enemy Offensive, also known as the Operation Kugelblitz (Ball Lightning), a series of operations undertaken by the Wehrmacht and the NDH military after the capitulation of Italy (Armistice of Cassibile) in an attempt to secure the Adriatic Sea coast. It took place in the autumn and winter of 1943/44.
- The Seventh Enemy Offensive, the final attack in western Bosnia in the spring of 1944, which included Operation Rösselsprung (Knight's Leap), an unsuccessful attempt to eliminate Josip Broz Tito personally and annihilate the leadership of the Partisan movement, located in Drvar.

By the end of the seventh offensive, the greater part of Yugoslavia was securely in partisan hands.

== Interpretations ==
It was the nature of partisan resistance that operations against it must either eliminate it altogether or leave it potentially stronger than before. This had been shown by the sequel to each of the previous five offensives from which, one after another, the partisan brigades and divisions had emerged stronger in experience and armament than they had been before, with the backing of a population which had come to see no alternative to resistance but death, imprisonment, or starvation. There could be no half-measures; the Germans left nothing behind them but a trail of ruin. What in other circumstances might possibly have remained the purely ideological war that reactionaries abroad said it was (and German propaganda did their utmost to support them) became a war for national preservation. So clear was this that no room was left for provincialism; Serbs and Croats and Slovenes, Macedonians, Bosnians, Christian and Moslem, Orthodox and Catholic, sank their differences in the sheer desperation of striving to remain alive.

— Basil Davidson

== Maps of operations ==
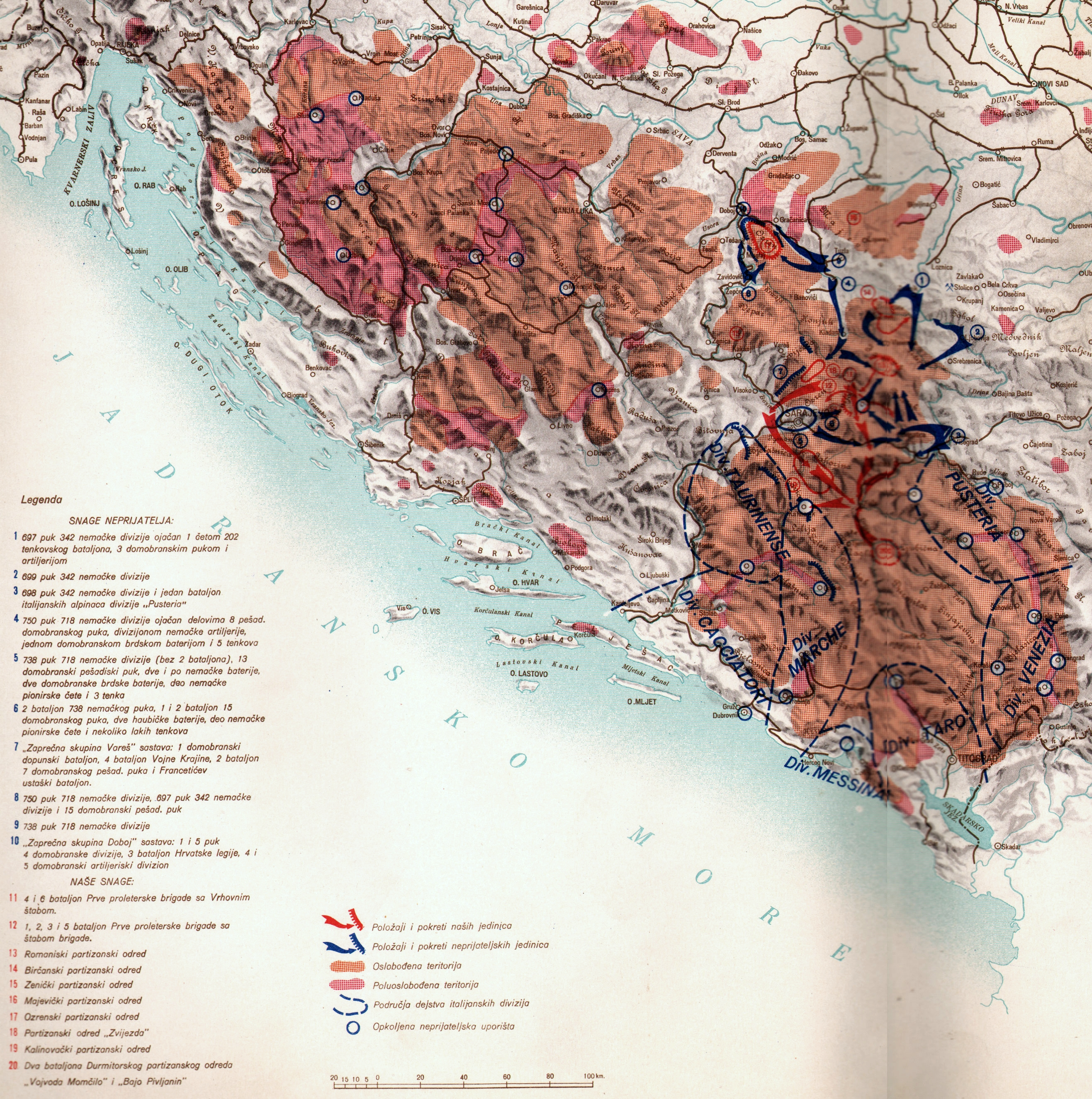
Second Enemy Offensive.

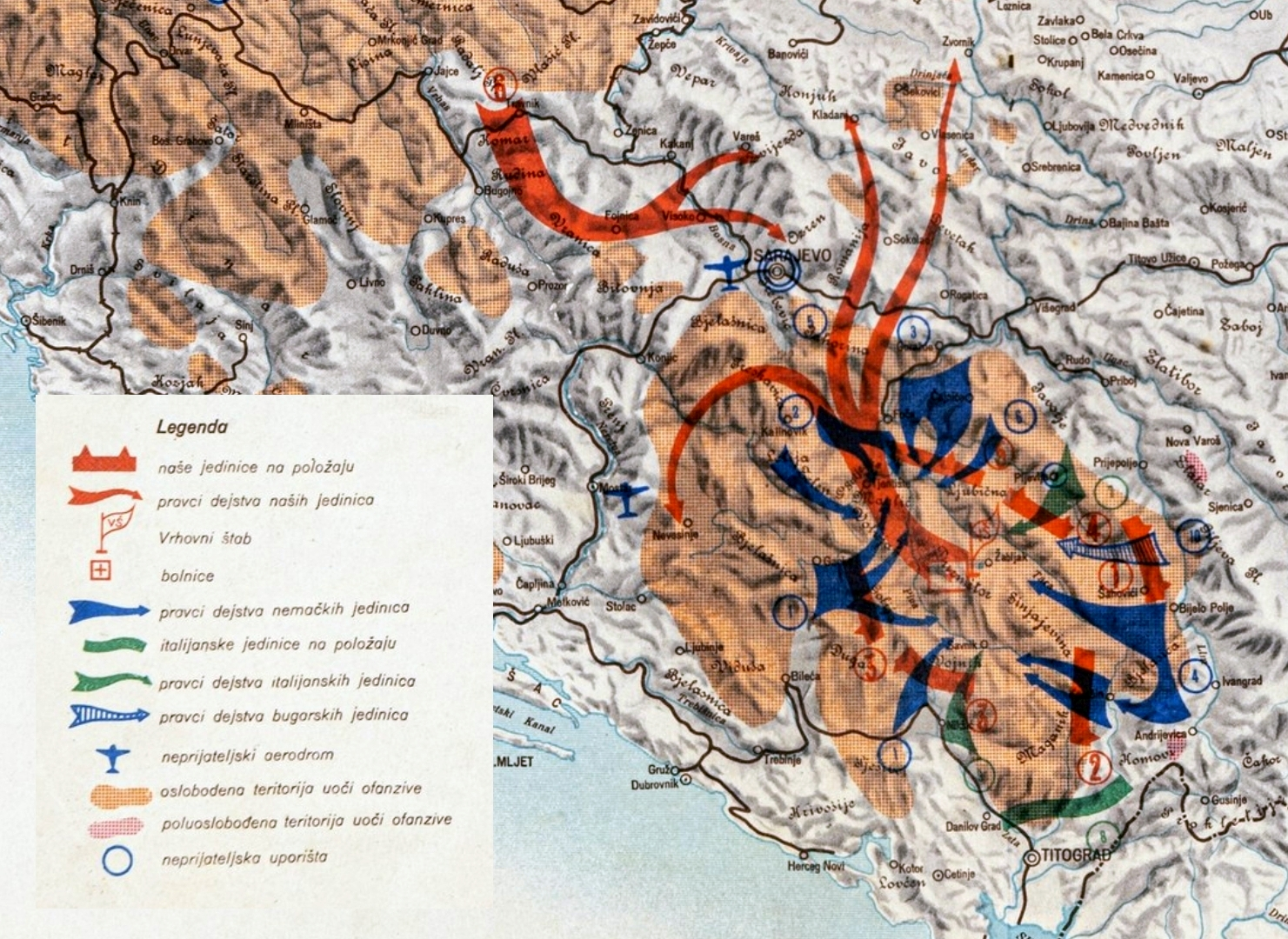
Fifth Enemy Offensive.

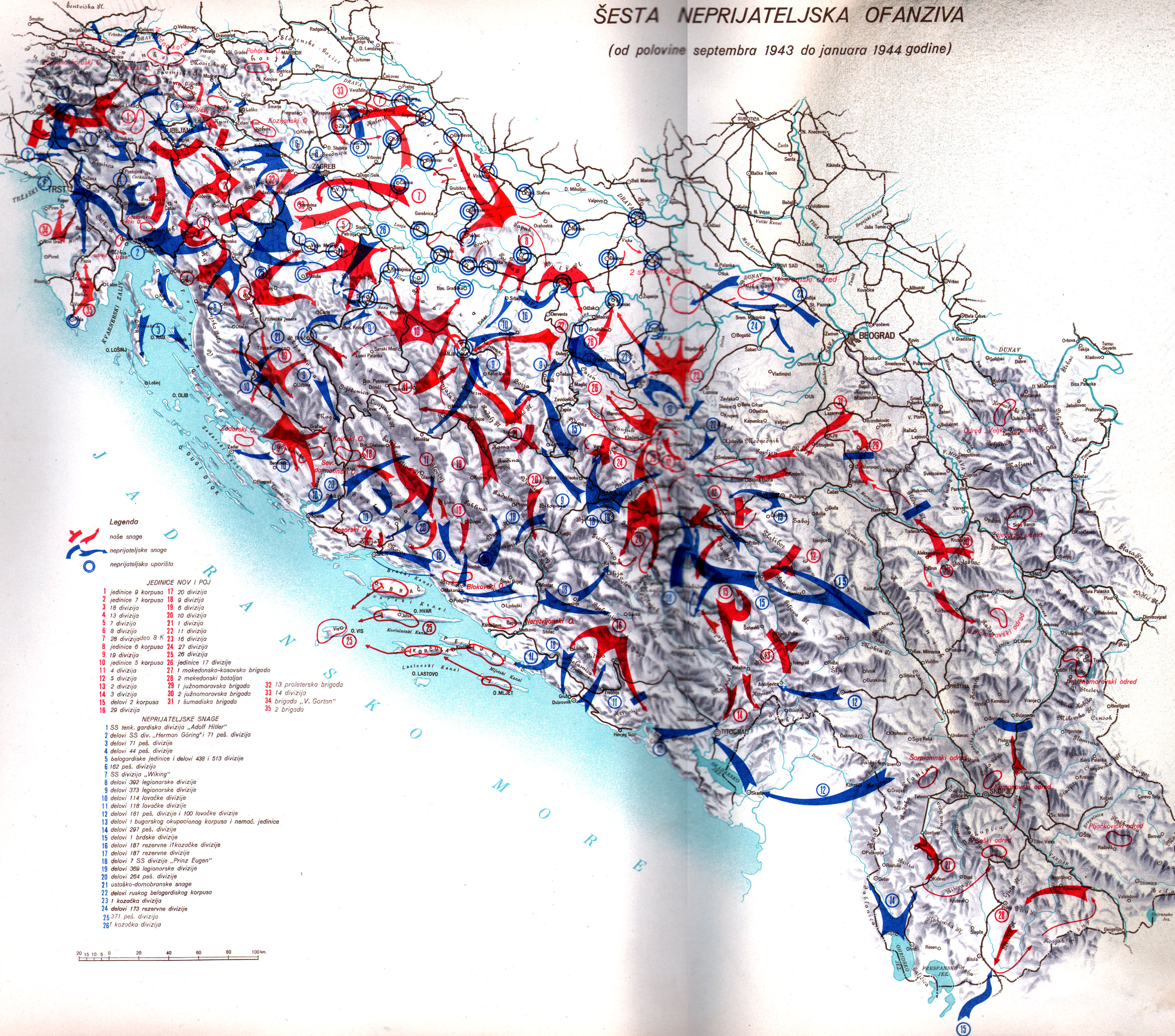
Sixth Enemy Offensive.

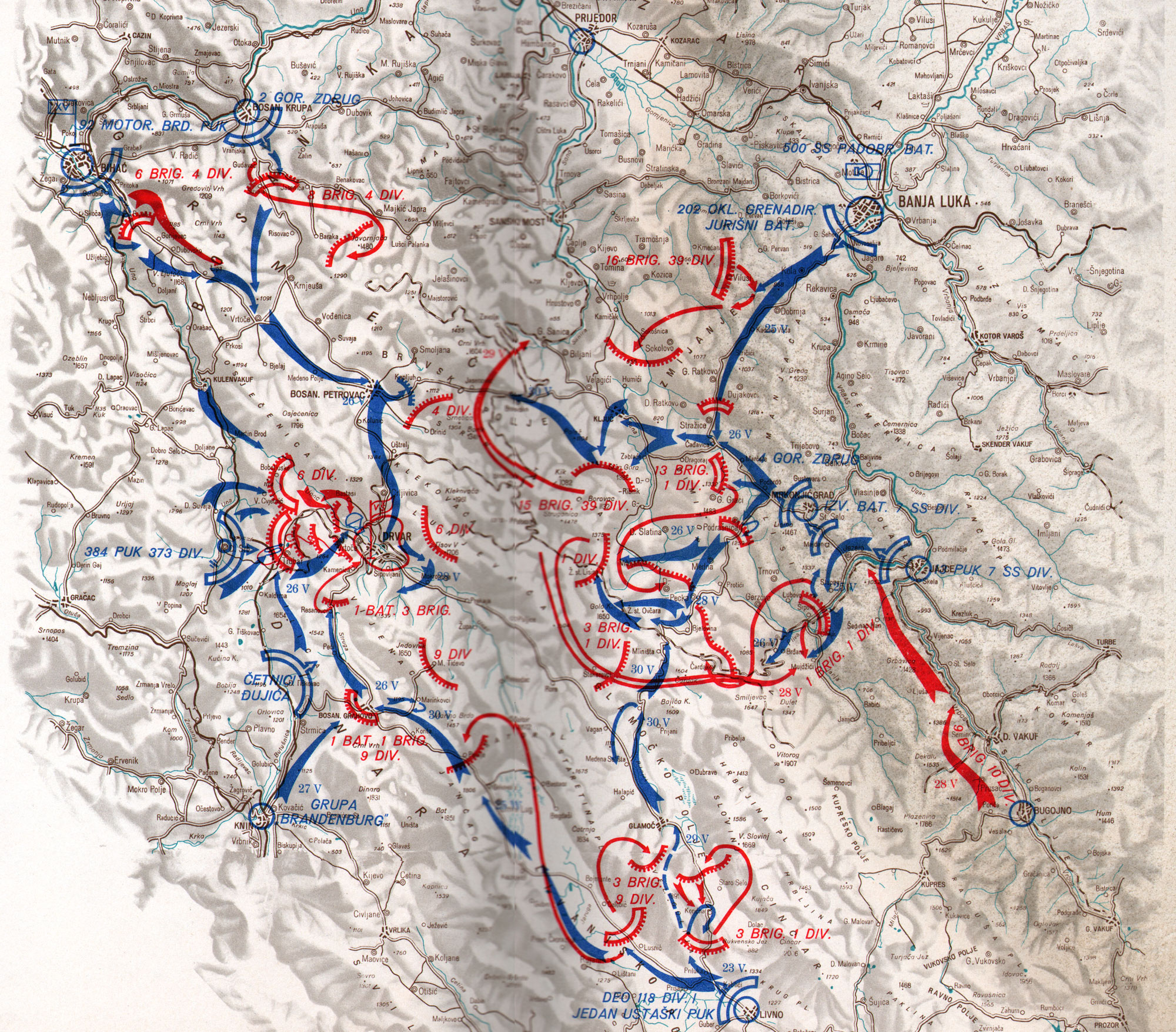
Seventh Enemy Offensive.

== See also ==
- Resistance during World War II
- Anti-partisan operations in World War II

== Bibliography ==
- Davidson, Basil (1946). Partisan Picture. Bedford Books. ISBN 0900406003. OCLC 2019137.
