= Operation Prijedor =

1942 military operation

- Part of World War II in Yugoslavia
| Date | Mid to late February 1942 |
| Location | northwest Bosnia 44°58′51″N 16°42′48″E |
| Result | Axis victory: Partisan withdrawal |

Belligerents
| Axis: Germany; Independent State of Croatia | Allies: Partisans |

Commanders and leaders
| (Nazi Germany) Oberst Rudolf Wutte | unknown |

Strength
| Around 5,000 troops | 1,000 troops |

Casualties and losses
| Unknown | Unknown |

Operation Prijedor was a German-Croatian joint counter-insurgency operation conducted around Prijedor in the Independent State of Croatia (NDH) during World War II. It targeted the Yugoslav Partisans that had isolated the garrison of Prijedor in Bosnia between late January and mid-February 1942.

== Operation ==
The operation was led by the German 750th Infantry Regiment of the 718th Infantry Division reinforced by a number of units of the Independent State of Croatia (NDH) (including several battalions of the Croatian Home Guard). It commenced in mid-February 1942 after Operation Ozren had concluded.

The Germans advanced south from Dubica towards Prijedor, where a German garrison battalion and a number of NDH units had been isolated by Partisan attacks on the railway lines in the surrounding area. The NDH units consisted of four infantry battalions, a gendarmerie battalion and artillery support, along with 29 companies of various types. The NDH units were used to guard the roads and effect a cordon around the area of the operation. The objective of the operation was achieved, and the garrison was relieved.

== See also ==
- Seven anti-Partisan offensives
- Resistance during World War II
- Anti-partisan operations in World War II
