= Jezdimir Dangić =

Bosnian Serb Chetnik commander

Major Jezdimir Dangić
- Јездимир Дангић
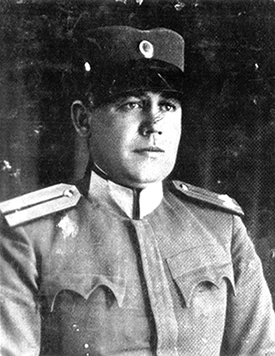
- Born: 4 May 1897; Bratunac, Austro-Hungarian rule in Bosnia and Herzegovina, Ottoman Empire
- Died: 22 August 1947 (aged 50); Federal People's Republic of Yugoslavia
- Cause of death: Execution by firing squad
- Spouse: Nevena Dangić
- Children: 3
- Military career
- Allegiance: Kingdom of Yugoslavia (1920–1921; 1928–1941); Chetniks (1941–1942); Nazi Germany (December 1941–April 1942); Government of National Salvation (1941–1942); Polish Home Army (1944)
- Branch: Gendarmerie
- Service years: 1920–1944
- Rank: Major
- Nicknames: Jezda; King of Romanija
- Commands: Gendarmerie detachment of the Yugoslav royal palace Mountain Staff of the Bosnian Chetnik Detachments
- Conflicts: World War II: Yugoslavia; Warsaw Uprising
- Awards: Order of the Star of Karađorđe
- Other work: novelist

Jezdimir Dangić (Serbian Cyrillic: Јездимир Дангић; 4 May 1897 – 22 August 1947) was a Yugoslav and Serb Chetnik commander during World War II. Born in the town of Bratunac, he was imprisoned during World War I for his membership of the revolutionary movement Young Bosnia. Dangić subsequently completed a law degree and became an officer in the gendarmerie of the Kingdom of Serbs, Croats and Slovenes at the beginning of 1928. In 1929, the country changed its name to the Kingdom of Yugoslavia. In 1940, Dangić was appointed to lead the court gendarmerie detachment stationed at the royal palace in the capital, Belgrade. During the Axis invasion of Yugoslavia in 1941, Dangić commanded the gendarmerie unit that escorted King Peter II to Montenegro as he fled the country. In August of that year, the leader of the Chetnik movement, Colonel Draža Mihailović, appointed Dangić as the commander of the Chetnik forces in eastern Bosnia. Here, Dangić and his men launched several attacks against the forces of the Independent State of Croatia (Serbo-Croatian: Nezavisna Država Hrvatska, NDH). Soon after his appointment, Dangić's Chetniks captured the town of Srebrenica from the occupiers. Afterwards, they became largely inactive in fighting the Germans, choosing instead to avoid confrontation. In December, Chetniks under Dangić's command massacred hundreds of Bosnian Muslims in the town of Goražde. In the same month, his Chetniks captured five nuns and took them with them through Romanija to Goražde, where they later committed suicide to avoid being raped.

In January 1942, Dangić ordered his forces to not resist German and NDH troops during the anti-Partisan offensive known as Operation Southeast Croatia. Afterwards, he was invited to Belgrade to negotiate the terms of proposed Chetnik collaboration with the Germans with the head of the collaborationist puppet government in the German-occupied territory of Serbia, Milan Nedić, and the Wehrmacht military commander of the territory, General der Artillerie (Note: Equivalent to a U.S. Army lieutenant general.) Paul Bader. Although a deal was struck, it was vetoed by the Wehrmacht Commander in Southeast Europe, General der Pioniere (Note: Equivalent to a U.S. Army lieutenant general.) Walter Kuntze, who remained suspicious of Dangić. Despite this, Dangić's Chetniks collaborated with German forces in eastern Bosnia over a period of several months beginning in December 1941. In April 1942, Dangić was arrested when he travelled to occupied Serbia despite promising to operate only within the territory of Bosnia, and was sent to a prisoner-of-war camp in German-occupied Poland. In 1943, he escaped from the camp and the following year participated in the Warsaw Uprising as a member of the Polish Home Army. In 1945, he was captured by the Soviet Red Army and was extradited to Yugoslavia, where he stood accused of committing war crimes. In 1947, he was tried, convicted, sentenced to death and executed by Yugoslavia's new communist authorities.

== Early life and interwar period ==
Jezdimir Dangić was born on 4 May 1897 in Bratunac, which was at that time in the Austro-Hungarian occupied Bosnia Vilayet of the Ottoman Empire. (Note: The historian Sima Ćirković writes that Dangić was born in either Bratunac or Srebrenica.) He was one of ten children born to Savo, a Serbian Orthodox priest, and Milica (née Popović). He attended high school in Tuzla, about 100 km (62 mi) north-west of Bratunac, and was a communist sympathiser in his youth. He was also one of the youngest members of the pan-Slavic revolutionary organisation known as Young Bosnia (Serbo-Croatian: Mlada Bosna, Млада Босна). On 28 June 1914, Archduke Franz Ferdinand of Austria was assassinated in Sarajevo by one of Dangić's Young Bosnia comrades, Gavrilo Princip. This event sparked the outbreak of World War I. After the assassination, Dangić was arrested by the Austro-Hungarian police. In September 1915, he was tried alongside 32 co-defendants in Bihać and convicted of partaking in revolutionary activities, for which he was sentenced to two-and-a-half years in prison. Dangić's parents were also arrested. His father was found guilty of treason and sentenced to death, but his sentence was later reduced to three-and-a-half years' imprisonment. Dangić's mother was never tried; she suffered a mental breakdown after spending several months in solitary confinement and her trial was postponed indefinitely.

Dangić was released from prison at the end of the war in November 1918. The following year, he helped organise a series of pro-communist demonstrations in Belgrade, for which he was arrested and imprisoned. In 1920, he was conscripted into the army of the newly created Kingdom of Serbs, Croats and Slovenes and assigned to a gendarmerie unit stationed in Kratovo (in modern-day North Macedonia). Upon being discharged from the gendarmerie, Dangić returned to Belgrade, where he enrolled at the University of Belgrade's Faculty of Law. He also became a member of the League of Farmers, a political party that sought to protect the interests of the Bosnian Serb peasantry, and which the historian Marko Attila Hoare describes as a precursor to the Chetnik movement in Bosnia and Herzegovina during World War II. Dangić was again drafted into the gendarmerie on 3 January 1928, this time as a cavalry sub-lieutenant, and was stationed in the border town of Subotica in the Vojvodina region. His career included assignments at Virovitica, Sarajevo, Tuzla, Sremska Kamenica near Novi Sad, and Zagreb.

Dangić and his wife Nevena had two daughters, Nada and Ljiljana. Between 1937 and 1941, Dangić published ten articles in the Belgrade daily Politika. He published his first novel in 1938, titled Naše tamnovanje (Our Imprisonment). The novel was published under the pseudonym Miroljub Bogić. It was a critical success. In 1940, Dangić published a second novel, titled Glad i tamnica (Hunger and the Dungeon), which was also well received. In 1940, Dangić was named head of the gendarmerie detachment stationed at Belgrade's royal palace. By the time of the Axis invasion of Yugoslavia in April 1941, he had reached the rank of major.

== World War II ==
=== Invasion and occupation of Yugoslavia ===
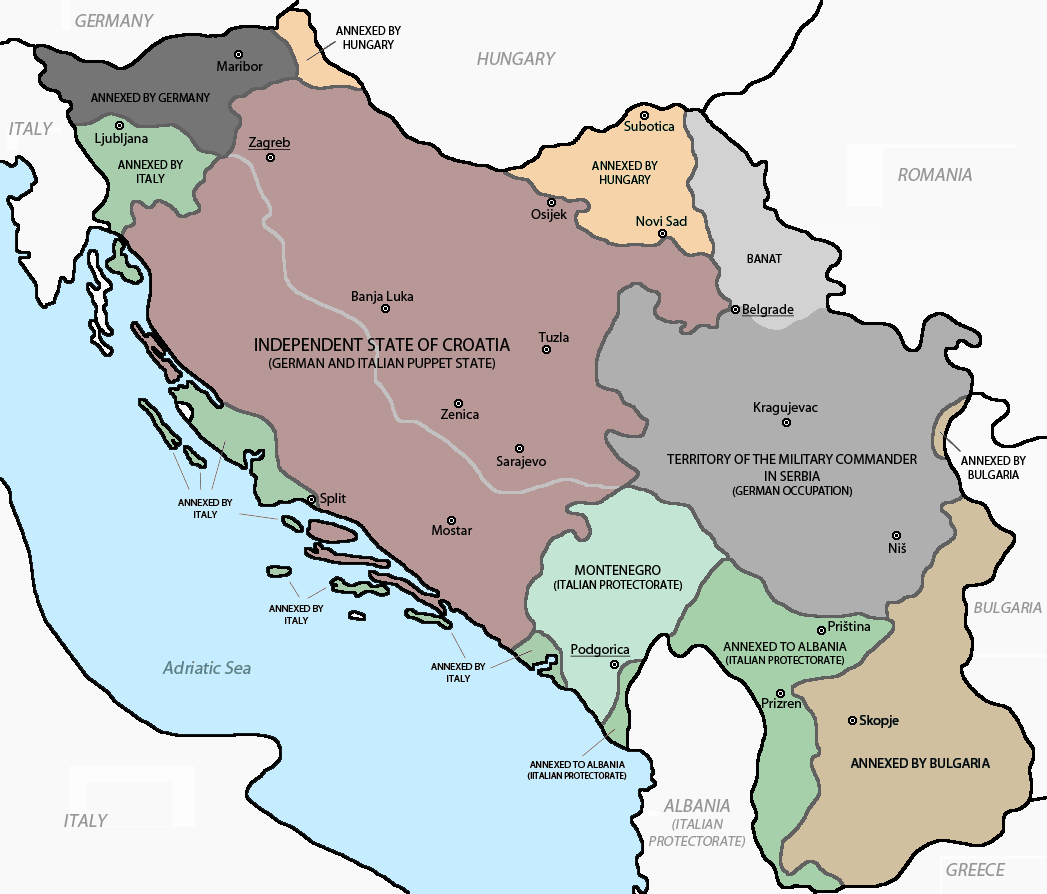
A map showing the Axis occupation of Yugoslavia from 1941 to 1943, including the demarcation line between the German and Italian zones.

In April 1941, Yugoslavia was invaded and quickly defeated by the Axis powers. During the invasion, Dangić was assigned to command the gendarmerie unit that escorted King Peter II to Nikšić Airport as he left the country. Yugoslavia was partitioned, and as part of this, the Germans established a military government of occupation in an area roughly the same as the pre-1912 Kingdom of Serbia, consisting of Serbia proper, the northern part of Kosovo (around Kosovska Mitrovica), and the Banat. The Germans did this to secure two strategic lines of communication – the Danube river, and the railway line that connected Belgrade with Salonika in occupied Greece, and thence by sea to North Africa. The German-occupied territory of Serbia was also rich in non-ferrous metals such as lead, antimony and copper, which Germany needed to support its war effort.

During the invasion, the extreme Croat nationalist and fascist Ante Pavelić, who had been in exile in Benito Mussolini's Italy, was installed by the Germans as Poglavnik (leader) of an Ustaše-led Croatian state – the Independent State of Croatia (often called the NDH, from the Serbo-Croatian: Nezavisna Država Hrvatska). The NDH combined almost all of modern-day Croatia, all of modern-day Bosnia and Herzegovina and parts of modern-day Serbia into an "Italian-German quasi-protectorate." NDH authorities, led by the Ustaše militia, subsequently implemented genocidal policies against the Serb, Jewish and Romani population living within the borders of the new state. Following the failure of the initial collaborationist puppet government in the German-occupied territory of Serbia, the Commissioner Government, Milan Nedić, a pre-war politician who was known to have pro-Axis leanings, was then selected by the Germans to lead the Government of National Salvation. Two guerilla movements emerged in occupied Yugoslavia – the Serb nationalist Chetniks, led by Colonel (later General) Draža Mihailović, and the multi-ethnic, Communist-led Yugoslav Partisans, led by Josip Broz Tito.

=== Command in east Bosnia ===
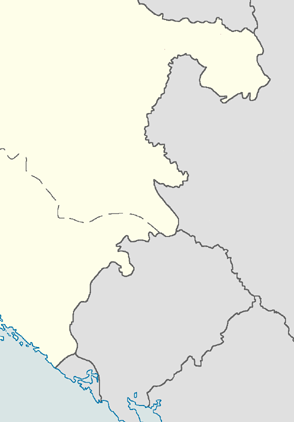
Map of eastern Independent State of Croatia showing the locations of towns in eastern Bosnia. The dashed line is the demarcation line between the German (north) and Italian (south) zones of occupation

==== Background ====
At the time of the Yugoslav surrender on 18 April 1941, Dangić was in Belgrade. He obeyed the summons of Milan Aćimović, head of the Commissioner Government, to serve in the Serbian gendarmerie and did so until mid-August. When news reached him of the Ustaše massacres of Serbs in the Bosnia areas of the NDH, he sought permission to travel there and escort his family and relatives to safety. His request was approved, and he travelled via Mihailović's headquarters at Ravna Gora. Early on, Mihailović designated Dangić as one of three men who were to succeed him as leaders of the Chetnik movement should anything happen to him. Initially, Mihailović's organisation was focussed on recruiting and establishing groups in different areas, raising funds, establishing a courier network, and collecting arms and ammunition. From the very beginning their strategy was to organise and build up their strength, but postpone armed operations against the occupation forces until they were withdrawing in the face of a hoped-for landing by the Western Allies in Yugoslavia.

Dangić likewise sought to avoid conflict with the Germans and began to pursue a policy of "self-defence against the Ustaše and revenge against the Croats and Muslims." Mihailović sent Dangić to eastern Bosnia to take command of the Chetnik detachments in the region and bring them under Mihailović's control, and he collected a group of Bosnian Serbs and crossed the Drina River into the NDH. Dangić was accompanied by Major Boško Todorović who had been appointed by Mihailović as his commander for eastern Bosnia and Herzegovina. Dangić himself was appointed as the commander of the Mountain Staff of the Bosnian Chetnik Detachments, and had direct responsibility for eastern Bosnia, including the senior local Chetnik commanders, Aćim Babić and Rade Kosorić. According to the historian Marko Attila Hoare, Dangić may have had more influence on Chetnik decision-making, despite his formal subordination to Todorović. Todorović was responsible for negotiating with the Italians, and Dangić with the Germans. At the time Dangić arrived in eastern Bosnia, some Chetnik detachments were still co-operating with the Partisans in the region.

==== Initial activities and liaison with the Partisans ====
Dangić arrived in east Bosnia on 16 August. In the beginning, his operations were directed primarily against the Ustaše and the Bosnian Muslim population of the area, where Dangić exercised considerable influence over the Serb population. On 18 August, a 400-strong Chetnik force led by Dangić captured the town of Srebrenica. The Chetniks confiscated all weapons that were in the hands of the local inhabitants and began recruiting local Serbs to join the Chetniks. On 1 September, Babić signed an agreement with the Partisan Sarajevo Oblast (district) Staff led by Slobodan Princip-Seljo and Boriša Kovačević to form a joint command. At the time, the Oblast Staff considered Babić's troops were "semi-bandit", and that they had undermined the position of the Partisans with local Muslims. Princip-Seljo and Kovačević had also intercepted one of Babić's couriers carrying a message to the Germans. In the message Babić offered to work with the Germans and assured them he was only interested in fighting the Ustaše. By early September, Dangić had established himself as the leader of the Chetnik groups in eastern Bosnia, including those led by Babić and Kosorić. On 5 September, in response to a failed joint Partisan-Chetnik attack on Kladanj, he burnt a number of Muslim homes, and his Chetniks engaged in the robbing and beating of Muslim civilians. At this point, occasional killings of Muslims occurred, although Hoare describes this behaviour as being "not yet genocidal." That month, under the direct orders of Dangić, Chetniks burnt and looted the Muslim village of Novo Selo, killing Muslims and carrying out other crimes in the process. At the end of September, the Abwehr (German military intelligence) reported that Dangić was supported by and was in contact with the Nedić administration. It also reported that "[Dangić] has had good relations with the Germans and does everything in order to avoid collision between his troops and the Germans."

On 1 October 1941, Dangić and two other east Bosnian Chetnik commanders, Pero Đukanović and Sergije Mihailović, met with the Partisan General Staff for Bosnia-Hercegovina at the village of Drinjača, south of Zvornik. The Partisans were Svetozar Vukmanović (known as "Tempo"), Rodoljub Čolaković and Princip-Seljo. The meeting agreed on the creation of a joint Chetnik-Partisan Staff, the "Command of the Bosnian Military and Partisan Detachments", to consist of six members, three Chetniks and three Partisans. The meeting also agreed that joint Chetnik-Partisan administration would be imposed on liberated areas, using the Partisan model of people's liberation committees. The resulting declaration was a compromise, and called on the patriotism of both Serbs and Bosnians, although Dangić opposed the inclusion of any call for the unity of Muslims or Croats with the Serbs of Bosnia-Herzegovina, as he stated that all Muslims were responsible for the Ustaše crimes against Serbs. According to Hoare, the Drinjača agreement represented the pinnacle of co-operation between Partisans and Chetniks in east Bosnia, but effectively sidelined the Provincial Committee. On 6 October, a further meeting was held at Milići near Vlasenica, and the composition of the joint staff was decided. Dangić, Babić and Sergije Mihailović became the Chetnik representatives, and Vukmanović, Čolaković and Princip-Seljo represented the Partisans, with Sergije Mihailović appointed as chief of staff. After the war, the Drinjača agreement was the subject of much heated debate between Vukmanović and Čolaković, with Vukmanović blaming Čolaković for the negative medium-term consequences of the agreement for the Partisan movement in east Bosnia. According to Vukmanović, these consequences included the virtual disappearance of an independent Partisan General Staff for Bosnia-Herzegovina, the domination of the joint staff by Sergije Mihailović, including his appointment of officers hostile to the Partisans as commanders of Partisan units, the diversion of weapons from the Partisan controlled arms factory at Užice to Chetnik troops, and the alienation of the Muslim and Croat population of the region. When Vukmanović raised his concerns with Tito, the Bosnian Communists were forced to insist that the joint staff could have no contact with Chetnik units except during operations against Axis forces, and no joint Chetnik-Partisan operations would be permitted in Muslim areas.

Relations between the Partisans and Chetniks were placed under pressure by the continued targeting of Muslims by Chetnik units. Over the period of 13–23 October 1941, a joint Chetnik-Partisan operation captured the town of Rogatica. During and after its capture, Chetnik elements of the force burned and looted Muslim homes, and Partisan units refused to obey orders to stop the Chetniks, stating they would not defend the "Turks".

During this time, Dangić and his men cooperated with the Partisans in accordance with Chetnik policy at the time. Chetnik–Partisan cooperation in areas under Dangić's command continued to some extent even after the two groups began clashing. Dangić is said to have held a "fierce hatred" of Muslims, allegedly saying that he wished to "kill them all", and that he had an "absolute willingness" to collaborate with the Germans. That autumn in the village of Zaklopača, about 8 kilometres (5.0 mi) east of Vlasenica, Chetniks commanded by Dangić barricaded a group of Muslims in a local Muslim religious school which was then set alight, killing eighty-one people. Chetnik persecution of Muslims worsened after the break with the Partisans. The largest Chetnik massacres took place in eastern Bosnia and preceded any significant genocidal campaigns by the Ustaše, which began in the spring of 1942. According to Hoare, the massacres were "above all an expression of the genocidal policy and ideology of the Chetnik movement".

Although his original objective was solely to protect the Serb population against the Ustaše, Dangić quickly became an important factor in the conflict between the two groups in eastern Bosnia. The Germans sought to win Dangić over to collaboration in order to strengthen anti-Partisan operations in the region, where Dangić's Chetniks reportedly numbered about 10,000 men, but at this time neither Dangić nor any of Mihailović's other commanders had any arrangement with the Germans.

On 9 November 1941, Mihailović ordered Dangić to attack Partisan forces in the Serbian town of Užice and to retain only his "most necessary units" in Bosnia. His order claimed that the Partisans were led by the Ustaše and were pursuing a "fratricidal war" amongst Serbs to "prevent the Chetniks from taking their revenge against the Croats." However, Dangić failed to carry out the attack, likely because he considered the strengthening of Chetniks in eastern Bosnia a greater priority and because Partisans in Užice had previously provided Chetniks in Srebrenica with arms and munitions from the local weapons factory. The factory later blew up on 21 November and the Partisans withdrew from Užice on 29 November after being forced out by the German 113th, 342nd, and 717th Infantry Divisions.

==== Vlasenica conference ====
The break between the forces of Mihailović and Tito in the German-occupied territory of Serbia spread to eastern Bosnia in early November. In response, a joint Partisan-Chetnik conference was held in Vlasenica on 16 November. It was convened by Čolaković and Vukmanović without consulting the Partisan Provincial Committee for Bosnia-Herzegovina. Serbian Partisans were situated at Ljubovija at the time, ready to launch an offensive across the Drina against Dangić's forces in Bratunac and Srebrenica, but held off at Čolaković's request. At the conference, Čolaković tried to maintain the alliance, but Vukmanović raised Mihailović's attack on Tito's headquarters at Užice and the Chetnik's failure to fight Axis forces. Dangić questioned Vukmanović's Montenegrin background and told him to return to Montenegro. The Partisan representatives sought a policy of brotherhood and unity among Serbs, Muslims, and Croats, whereas Dangić stated that his Chetniks were fighting a purely Serbian war for the Serbian people. Dangić's envoys told them they intended "to slit the throats of the Turks, except for any pretty Turkish ladies" and "screw down the Croats so hard that they wouldn't dare for a thousand years to look at a Serb askance." At this conference the two sides failed to come to an agreement. The next day a separate Chetnik conference was held where a 14-article resolution was adopted in support of Dangić's views. Meanwhile, the Partisan General Staff of Bosnia and Herzegovina appealed to the Chetnik rank and file that Partisan-Chetnik cooperation was broken due to the Chetnik importation of Royal Yugoslav Army officers from Serbia to Bosnia and due to Dangić wanting "to turn our People's Liberation Struggle into a war of Serbs against Muslims" as opposed to the Partisan belief "that the peaceful toiling Muslim people is not to blame for the crimes that the Ustaše have committed, and that the People's Liberation Army must protect them from persecution and killing." The Staff charged that Dangić wished for "Serbs to gather for a war of revenge" instead of the Partisans' "summon to our flag all honorable people, Serbs, Muslims, and Croats." They claimed that Dangić attempted to collaborate with the Germans and Italians.

==== Capture of Goražde and atrocities ====
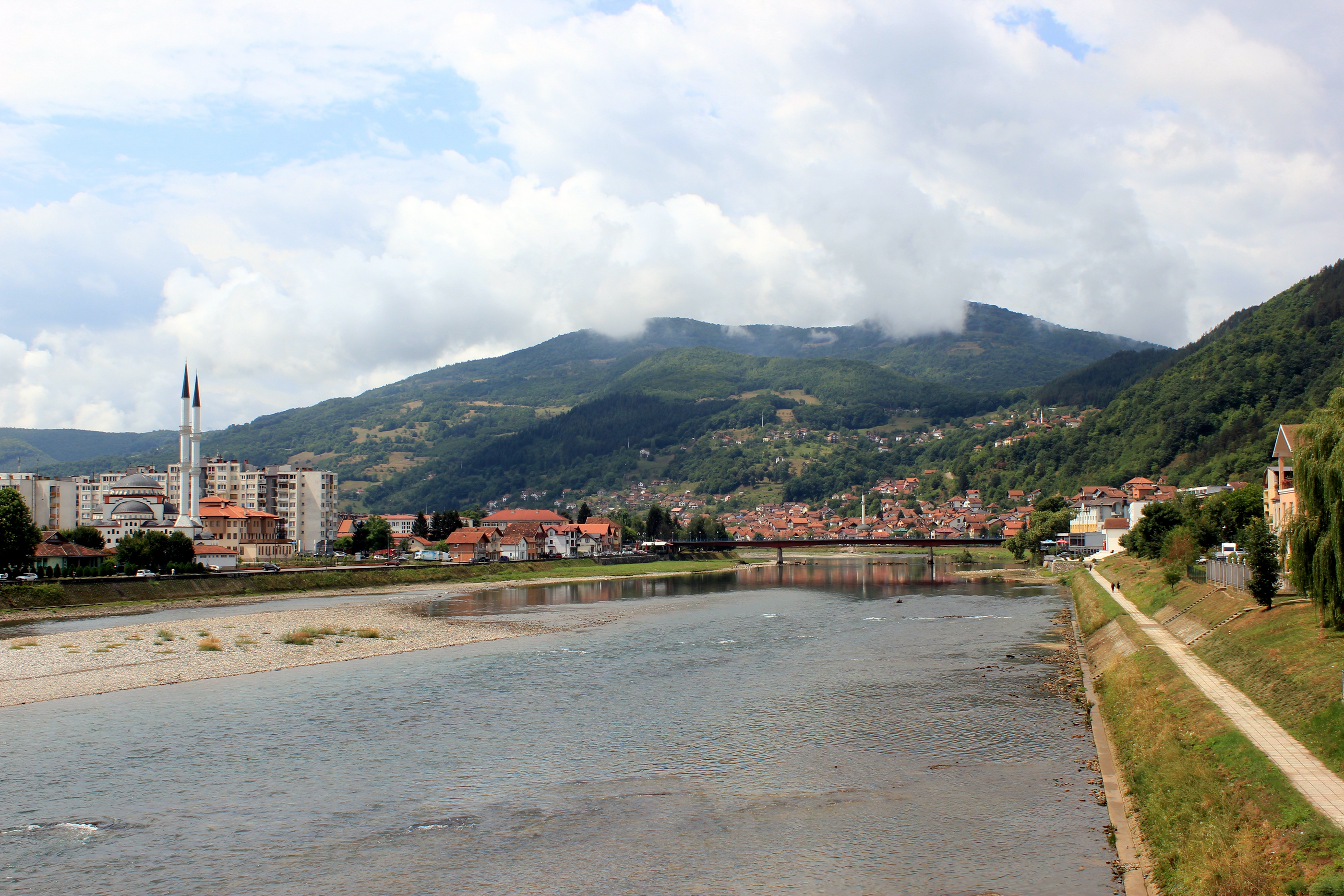
View of Goražde and the Drina river where the bodies of killed Bosnian Muslims were thrown.

Sources vary to some extent in respect of the Chetnik massacre of Muslims in the town of Goražde. According to Hoare, on 29 November 1941, the Italians handed Goražde over to the Chetniks, who immediately massacred Croatian Home Guard prisoners and NDH officials. This expanded into the systematic killing of the Muslim civilian population. Their corpses were left hanging in the town or were tossed into the Drina. Several hundred civilians were killed in Goražde at this time. Todorović had reached an agreement with Lieutenant-Colonel Castagnieri, commander of the Italian garrison in Goražde, regarding Italian evacuation and hand over of Goražde to the Chetniks. According to Tomislav Dulić, the town was occupied by Dangić and his Chetniks on 1 December. Upon arrival, Dangić gave a speech to a group of Serbs, Croats and Bosnian Muslims which contained references to Greater Serbia and ended with Dangić proclaiming that Serbs and Bosnian Muslims could no longer live together. Following the speech, Chetniks spread through the town and began killing, raping, pillaging and torching homes. A significant number of victims were killed on a bridge over the Drina, after which their bodies were dropped into the river. Chetnik forces in Bosnia, including those of Dangić, then set about pursuing an anti-Muslim campaign to recompense for the persecution experienced by ethnic Serbs in the NDH. On 11 December, Dangić's Chetniks entered Pale and looted and burnt down the local convent. They captured five Sisters of Divine Charity – two Croats, two Slovenes, and one Austrian – and took them with them through Romanija to Goražde, where on 15 December they committed suicide to avoid being raped.

==== Operation Southeast Croatia ====
In December 1941 and January 1942, Chetniks under Dangić's command co-operated with the Germans in eastern Bosnia. Between December 1941 and April 1942, Dangić engaged in direct negotiations with the Germans. During the latter half of December he met with Abwehr representatives numerous times in an effort to reach an agreement with them. In January 1942, Dangić and other Chetnik leaders met with Renzo Dalmazzo, the commander of the Italian 6th Army Corps. By this time, Dangić's cooperation with the Germans came to be seen as being even more valuable because of the arrival of Tito and his First Proletarian Brigade to eastern Bosnia. The Germans and Croats launched Operation Southeast Croatia on 17 January. Dangić and Todorović advised other Chetnik commanders that the operation was targeted at the Partisans, and there was no need for the Chetniks to get involved. Following this, their units withdrew from their positions on the front line, let the Germans pass through their areas, or went home. Many withdrew across the Drina river into the German-occupied territory of Serbia to avoid being engaged. On 22 January, Dangić ordered his own troops to permit the Germans to pass through Bosnia, saying "they are advancing peacefully and minding their own business without disturbing our unfortunate and long-suffering people." He urged Chetniks and Serbs to annihilate the Ustaše, Croats and Communists. Within a few days, the Germans and Croats succeeded in pushing the Partisans out of eastern Bosnia and southward into the Italian-occupied zone of the NDH. The Chetnik actions in response to Operation Southeast Croatia severely weakened Partisan defences with the result that they suffered significant casualties and lost a great deal of territory. The result was the severing of any remaining cooperative links that remained between the Chetniks and Partisans in eastern Bosnia. In the same month Dangić's staff declared that the Partisans "are led by the Kike Moša Pijade, the Turk Safet Mujić, the Magyar Franjo Vajnert, and that so-and-so Petar Ilić whose real name nobody knows [emphasis in the original]" and announced the shared goal of the Partisans and Ustaše was "to break up and destroy Serbdom. That, and that alone! [emphasis in the original]". In February, Dangić and other former Royal Yugoslav Army officers re-entered eastern Bosnia from the German-occupied territory of Serbia, where some of them had withdrawn to avoid Operation Southeast Croatia. They started to re-form Chetnik units in eastern Bosnia and began agitating against the Partisans on a "conservative, Serb-nationalist and anti-Muslim basis."

==== Meeting in Belgrade (1942) ====
In order to enlist further Chetnik aid and to intensify the Chetnik–Partisan split, Dangić was invited to Belgrade in late January by Nedić and General der Artillerie (lieutenant general) Paul Bader. There, meetings were held from 30 January to 2 February 1942. Present were Bader, Professor Josef Matl, and Colonel Erich Kewisch for the Germans, Dangić and Pero Đukanović for the Chetniks, and Nedić and Aćimović for the Serbian puppet government. Eventually, the involved parties reached an agreement. The terms of the agreement stipulated that:

1. Dangić and his detachments bordered by the Drina, Sava and Bosna rivers in the east and the Italian–German Demarcation Line to the south were to place themselves immediately under the command of Generalleutnant Johann Fortner, commander of the 718th Infantry Division and holder of executive power in the area.
2. Dangić's Chetniks were to remain aligned with the Germans, even in the event of a general uprising.
3. The town of Zvornik was to be Dangić's assigned seat of command.
4. Dangić's Chetniks were to help pacify northern Bosnia by ensuring that each Serb, Croat and Muslim there was to live in peace.
5. Murder was to be punishable by death.
6. The presence of NDH authorities was to be maintained.
7. Dangić was to spread news of the agreement, fight the Yugoslav Partisans, and protect German industrial and mining enterprises in eastern Bosnia according to Fortner's instructions.
8. Ammunition for Dangić's Chetniks was to be provided by Bader.
9. All prisoners held by Dangić's forces were to be released.

The parties all agreed that seventeen districts in east Bosnia would have its military control shifted from NDH control to Chetnik control with the German military in Serbia attaining authority over it and having the ability to supply certain Chetnik forces no longer considered illegal by the Germans. The Germans demanded the area remain formally a part of the NDH though Bader implied "East Bosnia from the Serbian frontier to the River Bosna together with Sarajevo will be incorporated into occupied Serbia." Dangić accepted it as formally being a part of the NDH, but informed the Chetniks in east Bosnia that occupied Serbia would include "the following districts from the territory of Bosnia: Sarajevo, Višegrad, Rogatica, Srebrenica, Visoko, Vlasenica, Zvornik, Kladanj, Fojnica, Travnik, Brčko, Foča, Doboj, Bijeljina, Tuzla, Zenica, and Čajniče." Đukanović understood the agreement as meaning Serbian annexation of the districts. However, despite the concurrence of the parties, the agreement was not signed because negotiations had not been cleared in advance by General der Pioniere Walter Kuntze, the Wehrmacht Commander in Southeast Europe. Kuntze believed and informed Bader that "Major Dangić is a Serb and will remain one. He has only made the offer in order to use East Bosnia as his troop training ground, to overcome the winter months, and to make preparations to gain East Bosnia for Serbia." Thus, he vetoed the conclusion of the agreement on 12 February. The agreement was also opposed by representatives of the NDH and the German Foreign Ministry. Siegfried Kasche, German envoy in Zagreb, Joachim von Ribbentrop, German foreign minister, and General Edmund Glaise-Horstenau, opposed the agreement with Kasche arguing it would harm the NDH's position, expand the suffering of Muslims in east Bosnia who outnumbered the Serbs, and damage German–Muslim world relations. This opposition led Bader to change his mind and not sign it.

Despite this, Dangić's Chetniks collaborated with German forces in eastern Bosnia over a period of several weeks and with the understanding that Dangić and his forces would operate only inside Bosnia. Bader reported following the talks that "Dangić on this occasion declared that he and his men would, even in the conditions of a general uprising in the Balkans and the arrival of the English, fight loyally and without wavering on the German side. He declared on this occasion his belief that only German victory could guarantee Serbia the position due to it in the Balkans, while the victory of Bolshevism would mean the destruction of every nation, thus also including the Serb nation." The plan of a Greater Serbia protected by the Germans continued to be pursued by Nedić and Dangić.

The Ustaše authorities were concerned about negotiations between the German and Italian commanders and Dangić, and were particularly worried that the Germans would permit the Italians and Chetniks to use Sarajevo as a base. In March, NDH gendarmerie in Tuzla reported "Nedić's Chetniks are distributing weapons and ammunition from the quota they receive from the Germans for the struggle against the Communists. They are constantly sent from Serbia into Bosnia and are claiming that they will conquer the latter." On 31 March, Jure Francetić, commander of the Black Legion, an Ustaše militia infantry unit consisting largely of Muslim and Croat refugees that fled from eastern Bosnia, launched a pre-emptive offensive primarily against Dangić's Chetniks. Francetić captured Vlasenica, Bratunac and Srebrenica, meeting limited resistance from the Partisans, and then scattered the more numerous Chetniks while inflicting significant losses and committing atrocities against segments of the Bosnian Serb population.

== Imprisonment, exile and death ==
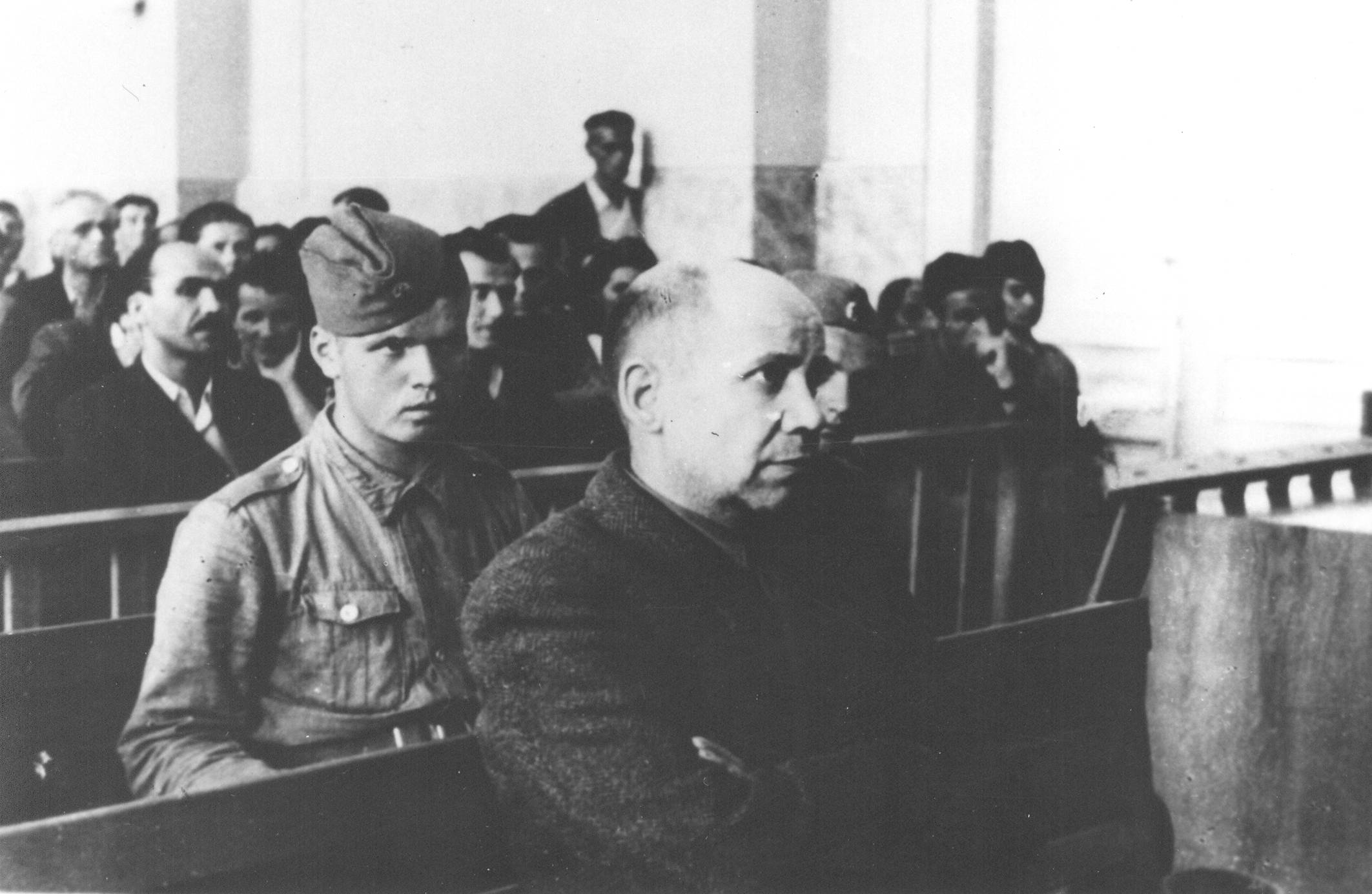
Dangić at his trial

In early April, Dangić made the mistake of travelling to Serbia, where he met with one of Nedić's representatives, as well as with various Chetnik leaders. Dangić made little effort to conceal his presence and even attended a public rally in Valjevo. Shortly thereafter, Kuntze ordered his arrest. The Abwehr soon learned that Dangić had found accommodation in the village of Rogačica, near Bajina Bašta. On the night of 11/12 April, the Abwehr ambushed Dangić in his sleep and arrested him. He was immediately sent to a prisoner-of-war camp in Stryi, in the Lviv region of Galicia, which formed part of the German occupation area of the General Government. Stevan Botić replaced him as the head of the Chetniks in eastern Bosnia.

According to the historians Vladimir Dedijer and Antun Miletić, Dangić escaped captivity in 1943. Ćirković writes that Dangić remained in captivity until the outbreak of the ill-fated Warsaw Uprising in August 1944. Dangić subsequently joined the Polish Home Army (Polish: Armia Krajowa), the leading anti-fascist resistance movement in German-occupied Poland. During the Warsaw Uprising, Dangić fought against the Germans. He was captured in the fighting and sent to a prisoner-of-war camp in Kraków. Following the camp's liberation in January 1945, Dangić surrendered to the Soviets. He was subsequently transferred to the Lubyanka Prison in Moscow, where alongside other members of the Polish Home Army, he was interrogated by the People's Commissariat for State Security. The Soviet Union eventually extradited him to Yugoslavia. He was charged with committing war crimes, engaging in counter-revolutionary activities, and collaborating with the Germans and Italians, as well as with the Serbian puppet government. Dangić was subsequently tried before the Third Army Court in Sarajevo. He was found guilty on all counts and promptly sentenced to death. Dangić was executed on 22 August 1947. (Note: The method of execution is subject to dispute. Miletić writes that Dangić was executed by firing squad. Ćirković concurs that this was the method of execution used. The historian Cathie Carmichael writes that Dangić was hanged.) Whether Dangić was executed in Sarajevo, Banja Luka or Belgrade remains unclear. Dangić's family did not flee Yugoslavia in the aftermath of the war. In 1954, his widow filed a claim requesting that she be made the recipient of his military pension. Her application was rejected on the basis of Dangić's prior conviction. In 2011, the five Sisters of Divine Charity who were abused by Dangić's Chetniks and subsequently died in their custody were beatified by Pope Benedict XVI and came to be known as the Blessed Martyrs of Drina.
