= Third Enemy Offensive =

The Third Enemy Offensive forms part of the Seven Enemy Offensives framework in Yugoslav historiography. It took place in modern-day Bosnia and Herzegovina and Montenegro in two stages, and consisted of two major counter-insurgency operations conducted in occupied Yugoslavia during 1942. These were:

- Operation Trio, a joint German-Italian counter-insurgency operation in eastern Bosnia from 15 April to 13 May 1942
- 1942 Montenegro offensive, an Italian-led counter-insurgency operation in the Italian governorate of Montenegro and eastern Herzegovina from mid-May to June 1942
