= 1942 Anti-Partisan offensive in Montenegro =

WW2 operation

1942 Montenegro offensive
- Part of World War II in Yugoslavia
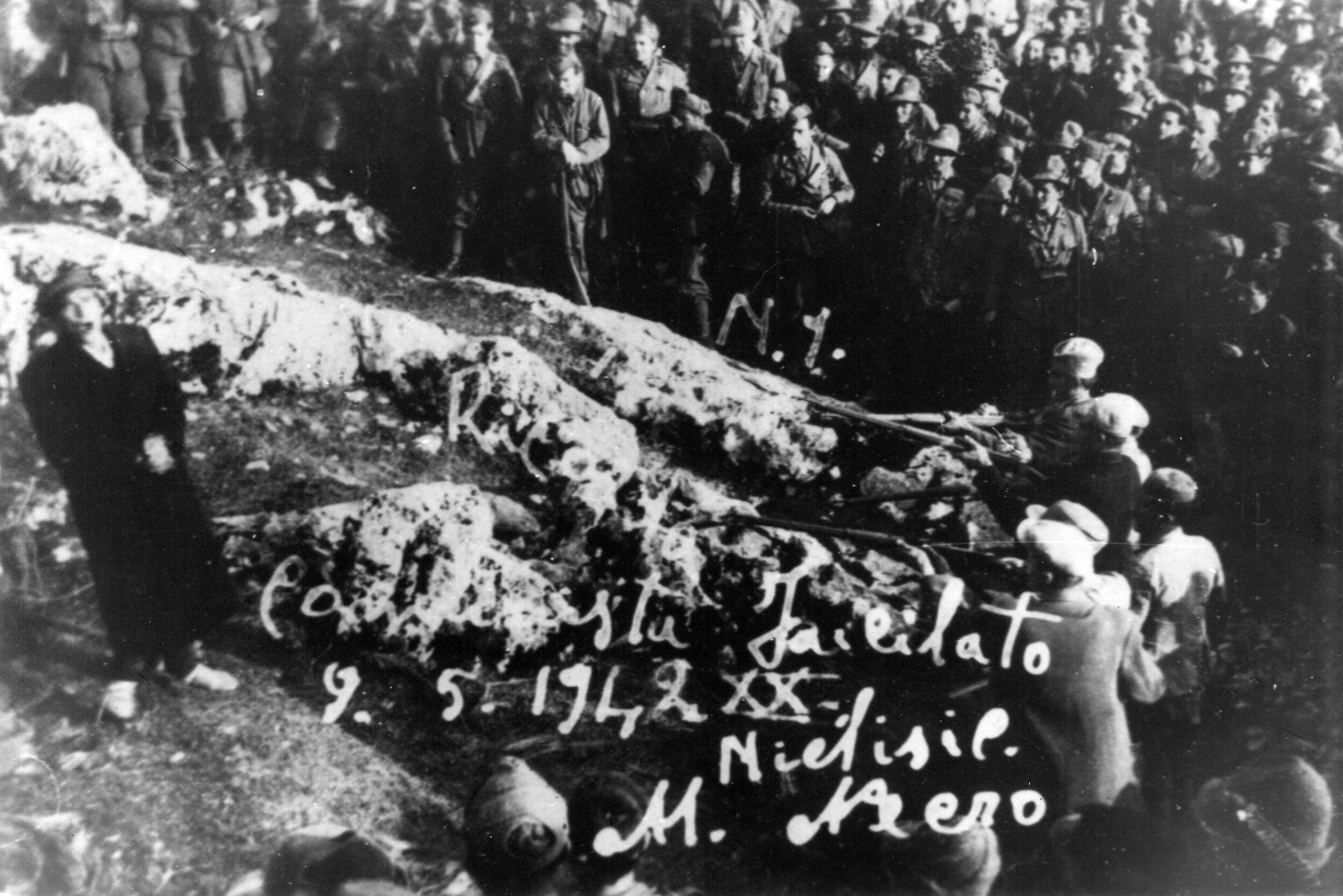
- Execution of Ljubo Čupić by firing squad, Nikšić, 9 May 1942
Date	mid-May–June 1942
Location	Italian governorate of Montenegro and eastern Herzegovina, Independent State of Croatia (present-day Montenegro and Bosnia and Herzegovina)
Result	Italian-Chetnik victory

Belligerents
Italy; Chetniks	Partisans

Commanders and leaders
Zaharije Ostojić	Josip Broz Tito; Konstantin Popović

Units involved
	1st Proletarian Brigade; 2nd Proletarian Brigade

The 1942 Montenegro offensive was an Italian-led counter-insurgency operation of World War II, which targeted the Yugoslav Partisans in the Italian governorate of Montenegro and the eastern Herzegovina region of the Independent State of Croatia (NDH). It was carried out from mid-May to June 1942, with Chetnik forces taking part on the Italian side. The offensive followed the conclusion of the joint German-Italian Operation Trio in eastern Bosnia. Together these two operations comprise what was known as the Third Enemy Offensive (Serbo-Croatian Latin: Treća neprijateljska ofenziva) in Yugoslav historiography.

The offensive resulted in the expulsion of almost all of the Partisans from Montenegro and eastern Herzegovina. Most of captured Partisans were executed by Italian occupying forces.

== See also ==
- Anti-partisan operations in World War II
- Resistance during World War II
