= Operation Uzice =

1941 German Wehrmacht operation in Yugoslavia, World War II

- Part of World War II in Yugoslavia
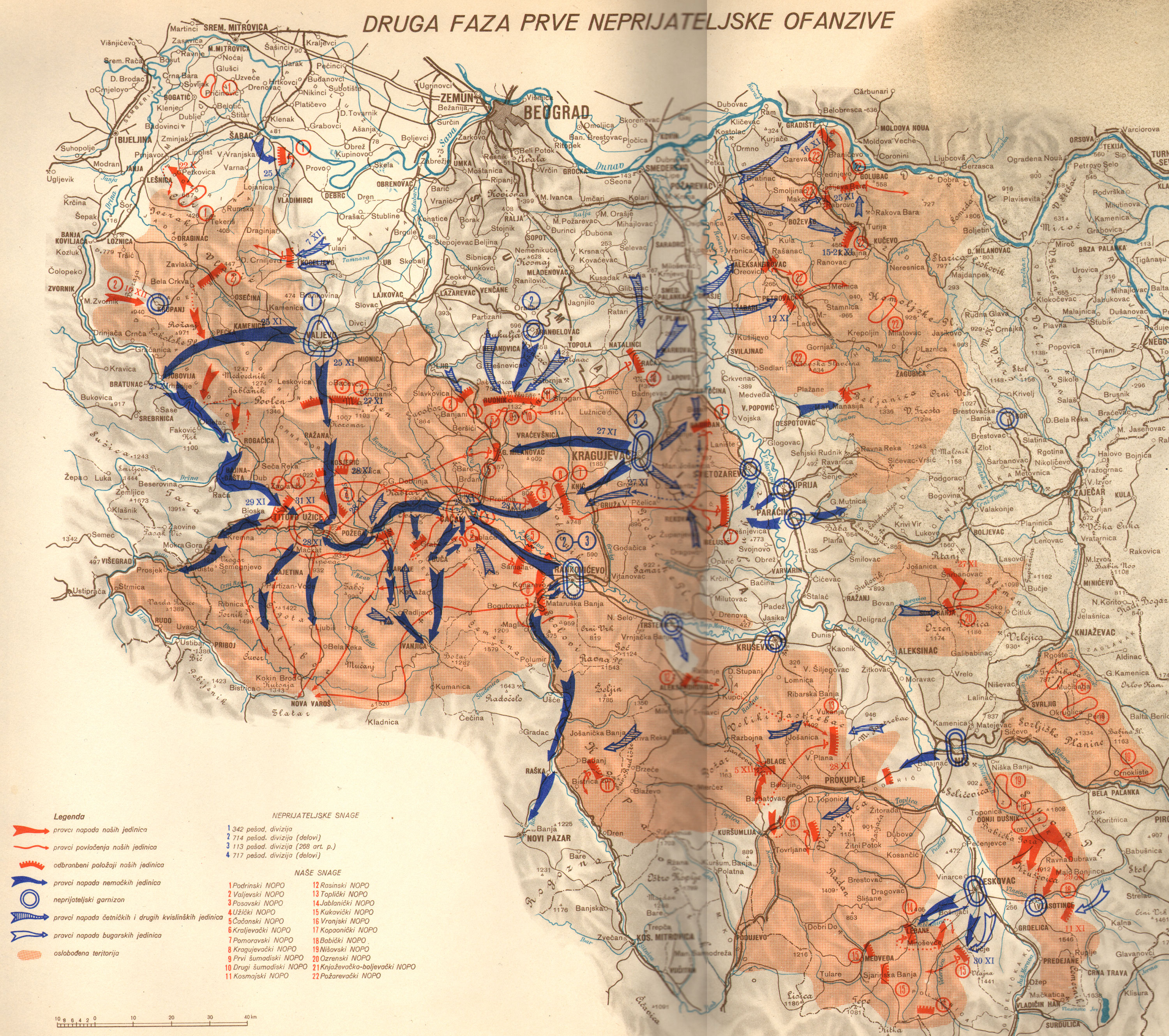
Date	September 27 – November 29, 1941
Location	Occupied Yugoslavia 43.51°N 19.51°E (today’s Bosnian/Serbian border, including the Partisan "Republic of Užice")
Result	German-Collaborationist victory: Partisan and Chetnik retreat and heavy losses; breakup and conflict between the two movements

Belligerents
September 27: Germany: Government of National Salvation; Independent State of Croatia		September 27: Yugoslav Partisans; Chetniks
November 1 on: Germany: Government of National Salvation	November 1 on: Chetniks	November 1 on: Yugoslav Partisans

Commanders and leaders
(Nazi Germany) Franz Böhme	(Chetniks) Draža Mihailović	(Yugoslav Partisans) Josip Broz Tito

Strength
113th Infantry Division (Wehrmacht); 342nd Infantry Division (Wehrmacht); Elements of: 704th Infantry Division; 714th Infantry Division; 717th Infantry Division; 718th Infantry Division; 100th Panzer Brigade (one battalion); Serbian Volunteer Corps; total around 80,000	(Chetniks) Around 3,000 (a proportion of which did not participate)	(Yugoslav Partisans) Around 20,000

Casualties and losses
Unknown	Unknown	4,180 killed c. 3,800 missing c. 6,700 wounded

Operation Uzice was the first major counter-insurgency operation by the German Wehrmacht on the occupied territory of the Kingdom of Yugoslavia during World War II. The operation was directed against the Užice Republic, the first of several "free territories" liberated by the Yugoslav Partisans. It was named after the town of Užice, and is associated with the First Enemy Offensive (Serbo-Croatian Latin: Prva neprijateljska ofenziva/ofanziva) in Yugoslavian historiography. The security forces of the German-installed puppet regime of Milan Nedić also participated in the offensive.

After the offensive commenced on 20 September 1941, the Partisans initially received assistance from local Chetnik formations in opposing the Germans, but after weeks of disagreement and low-level conflict between the two insurgent factions about how the resistance should proceed, the Chetniks launched an attack on the Partisans in the towns of Užice and Požega on November 1 which resulted in the Chetniks being repulsed. The Partisans then counter-attacked decisively, but by early December had been driven from liberated area by the German and Serb collaborationist offensive.

== Background ==
=== Užice Uprising ===
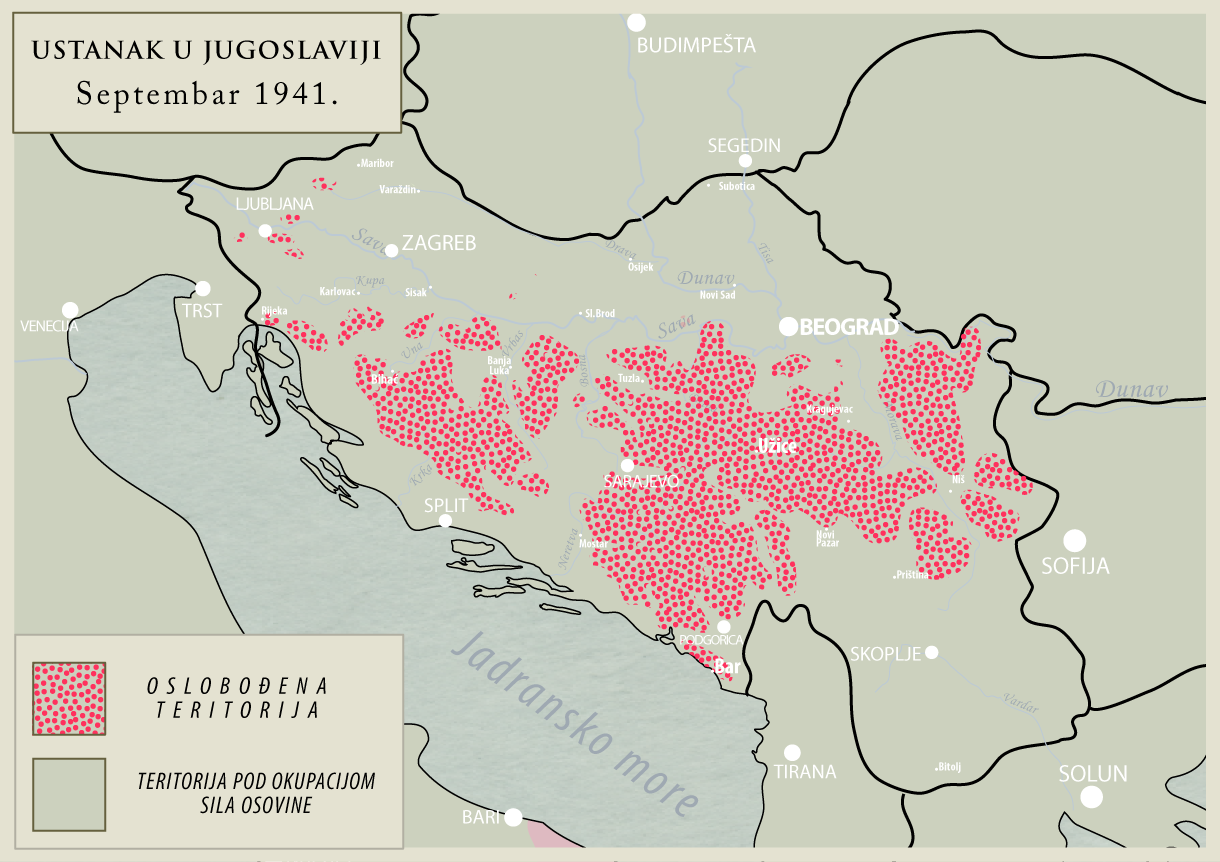
Uprising in Yugoslavia 1941.

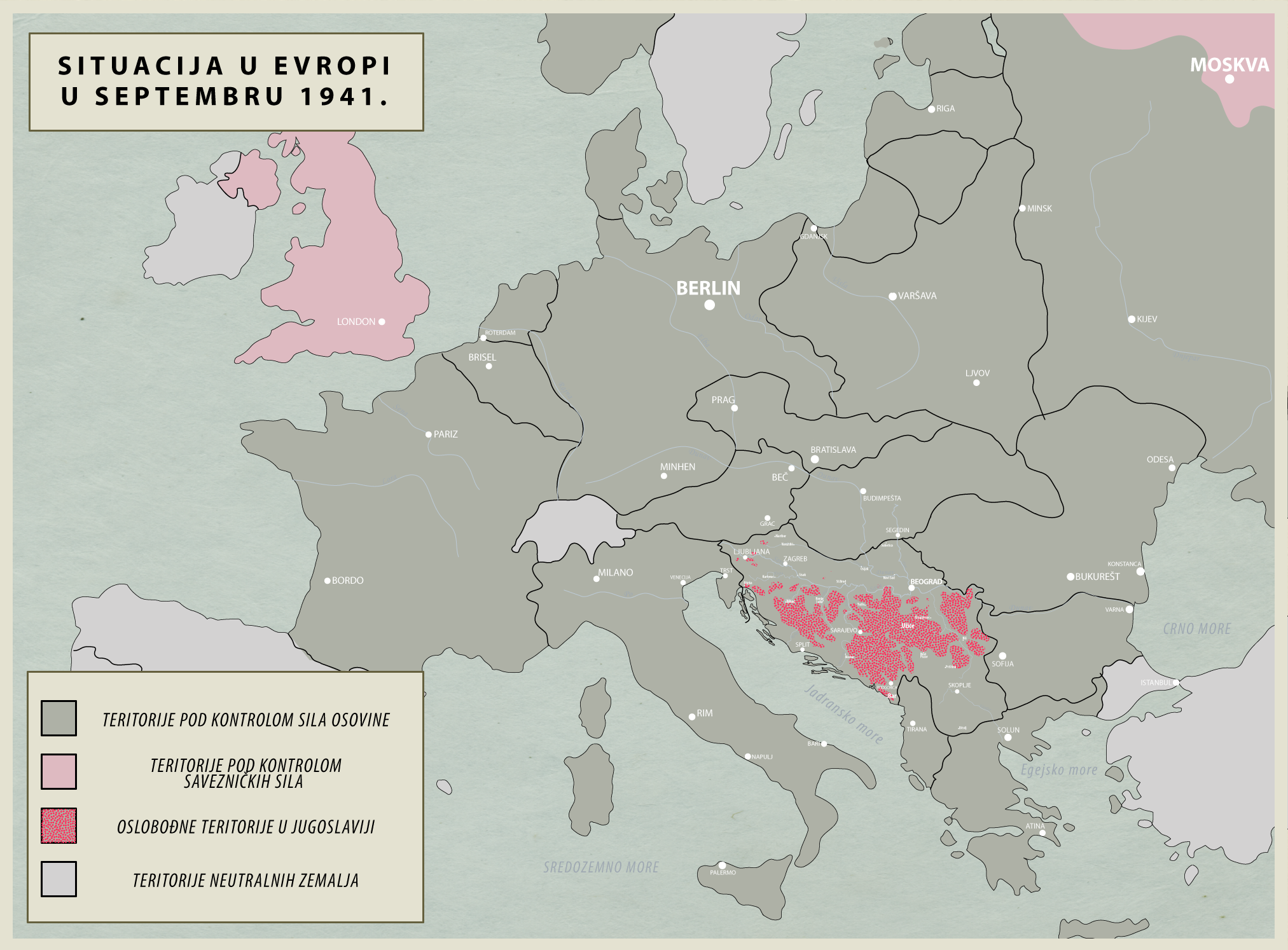
Uprising in Yugoslavia and Europe 1941.

On July 7, 1941, while Chetnik forces were still inactive, Josip Broz Tito and the Partisans staged a large-scale uprising in the region between Šabac and Užice, in the Krupanj area of northwest Serbia One Žikica Jovanović Španac shot the first bullet of the campaign on 7 July 1941 – marking the start of armed resistance in occupied Yugoslavia. The uprising was successful and secured a defensible, self-sustained, independent region, the first of many "free territories" to be established by the Partisans during the course of the war, and was commonly called the "Užice Republic". Almost immediately, the Germans made a concerted effort to find out whether the Chetniks ("nationalists") supported the uprising, as they felt that only with nationalist support could it acquire a mass character. On August 14 the Headquarters of the Military Commander in Serbia reported to the OKW that the Partisan forces thus far enjoy no support from the nationalists. Despite this, the German military forces in the region were deemed insufficient to quell the uprising, which by August 27 had become "more acute" and was rapidly spreading. Because of this, and since no reinforcements could be expected, the German authorities decided to rely on enlarging Serbian auxiliary forces in order for the "Serbs themselves to crush the communist activity".

By September 1941, after seeing the considerable success of the uprising, and observing its wide, and growing, support among the populace, the Chetniks realized that if they did not join the fight, they would likely forfeit their standing as the leaders of Serbian resistance. On September 12, German intelligence reported that Chetnik units are taking up positions alongside the Partisans. Reporting on the events to the government-in-exile, Yugoslav politician Dr. Miloš Sekulić stated that the Chetnik resistance has a "defensive character", while the Partisans managed to unite elements of the Yugoslav people inclined toward active resistance.

In mid-September 1941, Josip Broz Tito and the Partisan General Staff moved from Belgrade to the Užice Republic where the Partisans had by now formed 25 new military detachments. A few days later on September 19, Tito met with Draža Mihailović in order to negotiate an alliance between Partisans and Chetniks, but they failed to reach an agreement. Tito was in favor of a joint full-scale offensive, while Mihailović considered a general uprising to be premature and dangerous, as he deemed it would trigger reprisals. Chetnik support for the rebellion was partial: of some 5,000–10,000 available men, the Chetniks fielded about 3,000 in the area, while an unknown proportion of these did not enter the fighting.

=== German reaction ===
In the meantime, on 16 September 1941 Field Marshal Wilhelm Keitel issued an order applying to all Europe to kill 50–100 hostages for every German soldier killed. German commander Franz Böhme ordered Keitel's directive to be carried out in Serbia in the most drastic manner and that with no exception one hundred hostages would be executed for every German killed. Invested by Hitler with total authority and told to "restore order for the longer term in the entire area by the most radical means", Böhme made it clear from the beginning that he intended if necessary to wage war against the whole Serbian population by considering all civilians as enemies. He was also instructed to apply the order directive concerning the taking of hostages not just to attacks concerning German military personnel, but also ethnic Germans, Bulgarian military personnel, individuals in the service of the occupation authority, and eventually to members of the Serbian administration. Each act of insurgency was to be considered of "communist" origin. The German military declared Serbia a war zone, and villages began to be torched. Ten German soldiers having been killed in a joint Partisan-Chetnik attack on Kraljevo, 1,700 hostages were shot on 20 October. Several other thousand hostages were executed during the following weeks in reprisals against the insurgents’ attacks.

=== Initial operations ===
To clear this territory, the German Army employed its 113th Infantry Division and 342nd Infantry Division, and parts of 704, 714, 717 and 718 Infantry Divisions. They were assisted by Dimitrije Ljotić’s Serbian Volunteer Corps and Kosta Pećanac’s personal Chetnik faction. As German forces entered the territory they faced significant resistance, especially on Rudnik Mountain and in Kraljevo. As retribution for lost men and the way their bodies were mutilated by the partisans, Germans executed 2,000-2,700 people in Kragujevac between September 21 and September 23. On September 29, the offensive officially started when the 342nd Infantry Division attacked Partisans on the road between Šabac and Loznica. Concurrently, an offensive known as Operation Višegrad was launched in Bosnia and Herzegovina, then annexed as part of the Independent State of Croatia, as the Army of the Independent State of Croatia set to destroy the Partisan and Chetnik holdouts in and around Rogatica and Višegrad. Attacks by NDH troops went on for several weeks, without any side making substantial gains.

=== Chetnik attack ===
By the beginning of October, several small towns in Serbia were in the hands of Partisan or Chetnik groups. While distrustful of each other, Partisans and Chetniks started taking joint actions and besieging larger towns. Their respective commands were set in Užice and Požega, 15 km apart. During October, all hopes of a continued cooperation were drained away in sporadic bickering and outright violations of agreements. During these weeks it also became obvious that, while the Partisan command had no doubts about continuing the struggle, the Chetniks were wavering and looking for a way of giving up the fight against the Germans and directing all their power against the Partisans. A process of polarization took place, taking several weeks and producing shifts in loyalties. The Chetnik detachments of Rev. Vlada Zečević and Lieutenant Ratko Martinović switched to the Partisans during this time.

Tito and Mihailović met again on October 26 or 27, 1941 in the town of Brajići near Ravna Gora in a final attempt to achieve an understanding, but found consensus only on secondary issues. Mihailović rejected principal points of Tito's proposal including the establishment of common headquarters, joint military actions against the Germans and quisling formations, establishment of a combined staff for the supply of troops, and the formation of national liberation committees. Mihailović did not arrive at the meeting in good faith. The Chetnik command had already dispatched to Belgrade Colonel Branislav Pantić and Captain Nenad Mitrović, two of Mihailović's aides, where they contacted German intelligence officer Captain Josef Matl on October 28. They informed the Abwehr that they have been empowered by Colonel Mihailović to establish contact with Prime Minister Milan Nedić and the appropriate Wehrmacht command posts to inform them that the Colonel was willing to "place himself and his men at their disposal for fighting communism". The two representatives further gave the Germans their commander's guarantee for the "definitive clearing of communist bands in Serbian territory" and requested aid from the occupation forces in the form of "about 5,000 rifles, 350 machine guns, and 20 heavy machine guns".

After more than a month of disagreements and minor collisions, the events culminated on November 1 in a massed Chetnik attack in and around the town of Užice where the Partisans had their headquarters. Apparently underestimating the Partisans' numbers, the Chetnik forces were quickly beaten back. Captain Duane Hudson, British liaison officer in Yugoslavia, then advised the Allied command in Cairo to stop supplying the Chetniks so the British arms would not be used for civil warfare. The Chetniks, who had already received one shipment of weapons sent by parachute, then waited in vain for a second one, even though the British later resumed helping them. Both Tito and Mihailović, however, were still willing to reach a truce, although both were pressed by some of their officers to attack the other as soon as possible; ceasefires alternated with ultimatums, as bloody reprisals between the two resistance movements affected both sides' morals and alienated civilians. At one point, Mihailović's forces, after mounting a surprise attack on the Partisans, found themselves surrounded. The Partisans allowed them to go free, which political observers have attributed to military foresight, as the Chetniks would continue to attack German forces.

== Aftermath ==
Mihailović eventually realized that his force was unable to protect civilians against German reprisals. The attitude of some of his officers had accelerated the breakup with the Partisans. Faced with indiscipline and a lack of ammunition, he soon found his troops decimated by the conflict with both Germans and Partisans.

Following the defeat, Mihailović was left with greatly reduced troops. German Captain Josef Matl and Chetnik Colonel Branislav Pantić (one of two Chetnik delegates to the occupation authorities in Belgrade) arranged a meeting between Mihailović and German military intelligence (Abwehr) representatives. The meeting took place in the village of Divci on November 11, while the exact circumstances of the meeting remain controversial. There are indications that Mihailović offered to cease activities in the towns and along the major communication lines, but ultimately no agreement was reached at the time due to German demands for the complete surrender of the Chetniks. After the negotiations, an attempt was made by the Germans to arrest Mihailović. Mihailović's negotiations with the enemy were carefully kept secret from both the Partisans, the Yugoslav government-in-exile, and from the British and their representative Captain Hudson.

German forces and their allies advanced from the north and east towards Užice, and by the 2nd half of November the Partisan forces were in full retreat. On November 25, the final phase of the German offensive against both rebel groups began. Tito and Mihailović had one last phone conversation: Tito announced that he would defend his positions, while Mihailović said that he would disperse. Ultimately, on November 29, the Partisans, including their headquarters which were stationed there, left Užice.

On December 10, a bounty was put on Mihailović's head, while he himself narrowly escaped capture. Faced with the impact of the German offensive, Mihailović decided to temporarily disband most of his forces and keep only a small staff. The remnants of his Chetniks retreated to the hills of Ravna Gora, but were under German attack throughout December.

Both Tito and Mihailović had suffered a heavy setback. Tito had been surprised by the scale of the uprising, and had found himself managing inexperienced peasant fighters who were reluctant to move away from their towns, or to accept authority and indoctrination. Mihailović had also been unable to impose discipline on his officers, and had not received sufficient help from the British.

After leaving Užice, the Partisans headed for Sandžak, into Italian-occupied territory. Some detachments failed to retreat on time and were dispersed or destroyed. After the main Partisan forces left for Sandžak, only parts of five Partisan detachments were present in Serbia.

== See also ==
- World War II in Yugoslavia
- Seven enemy offensives
- Resistance during World War II
- Anti-partisan operations in World War II
