= Johann Fortner =

German general (1884–1947)

- Born: 25 November 1884; Zweibrücken, Kingdom of Bavaria, German Empire
- Died: 26 February 1947 (aged 62); Belgrade, PR Serbia, FPR Yugoslavia
- Cause of death: Execution by hanging
- Military career
- Allegiance: Bavaria; Germany
- Branch: Royal Bavarian Army; Heer
- Service years: 1903–1944
- Rank: Generalleutnant
- Nickname: Hans
- Commands: 718th Infantry Division
- Conflicts: Western Front 1914–1916; World War II in Yugoslavia 1941–1943
- Awards: Iron Cross 1st Class

Johann Fortner (25 November 1884 – 26 February 1947) was a German Generalleutnant during World War II who commanded the 718th Infantry Division from its formation in May 1941 until he was relieved in March 1943. During his command the division engaged in anti-Partisan operations throughout occupied Yugoslavia, mainly within the Independent State of Croatia. The Nazi security warfare conducted by the division whilst under his command involved brutal and widespread massacres and burning of villages. He was retired from active duty in 1944. After the war, Fortner was extradited to Yugoslavia, convicted in a war crimes trial and executed.

== Early life ==
Fortner was born in Zweibrücken in the Kingdom of Bavaria in 1884. In 1903, Fortner joined the 5th Bavarian Regiment of the Royal Bavarian Army as a Fahnenjunker (officer cadet). During World War I Fortner served on the Western Front with the 5th Bavarian Infantry Regiment (as part of the 4th Bavarian Infantry Division. He started the war as an Oberleutnant and was promoted to Hauptmann, commanded a company of his regiment and was awarded the Iron Cross 2nd and 1st Class. He was captured by the British Army during the Battle of Flers-Courcelette on 15 September 1916 and remained a prisoner of war for the remainder of the war.

Soon after he was released from internment in November 1919, Fortner transferred from the Reichswehr to the Bavarian State Police and over a period of 15 years rose to the rank of Polizei-Oberst (Police Colonel) before joining the Wehrmacht soon after its creation in 1935 with the rank of Oberst (Colonel), and was appointed as the commander of the Kassel military district.

== World War II ==
In 1939 Fortner was appointed as the director of training in Landeck in Tyrol, Austria. In May 1941 he was appointed to command the newly raised 718th Infantry Division, and this was followed by his promotion to Generalmajor in June 1941.

While Fortner was based in Sarajevo, he visited the Bosnian National Museum and demanded that the museum custodians hand over a 14th-century illuminated Jewish manuscript known as the Sarajevo Haggadah. The chief librarian of the museum, a Bosnian Muslim, told Fortner that the manuscript had already been handed over to another German officer. The librarian then smuggled the manuscript to a village in the mountains, where the local imam secreted it amongst the Korans in his library. The manuscript survived the war and was returned to the museum.

Between May 1941 and June 1942, Fortner's division was the only permanent German garrison in the Independent State of Croatia. While under Fortner's command, members of the division executed Jews and Romani in the Territory of the Military Commander in Serbia.

In November 1942, Fortner was promoted to Generalleutnant. On 15 March 1943, Fortner was relieved and placed on the reserve list of generals. On 31 March 1944, he was retired from military duties. Fortner was extradited to Yugoslavia after the war ended, tried and found guilty of the murder of Yugoslav civilians during his command of the 718th Infantry Division. He was sentenced to death on 16 February 1947 and was hanged less than two weeks later.
