= 118th Jäger Division =

718th Infantry Division 118th Jäger Division
- 718. Infanterie-Division; 118. Jäger-Division
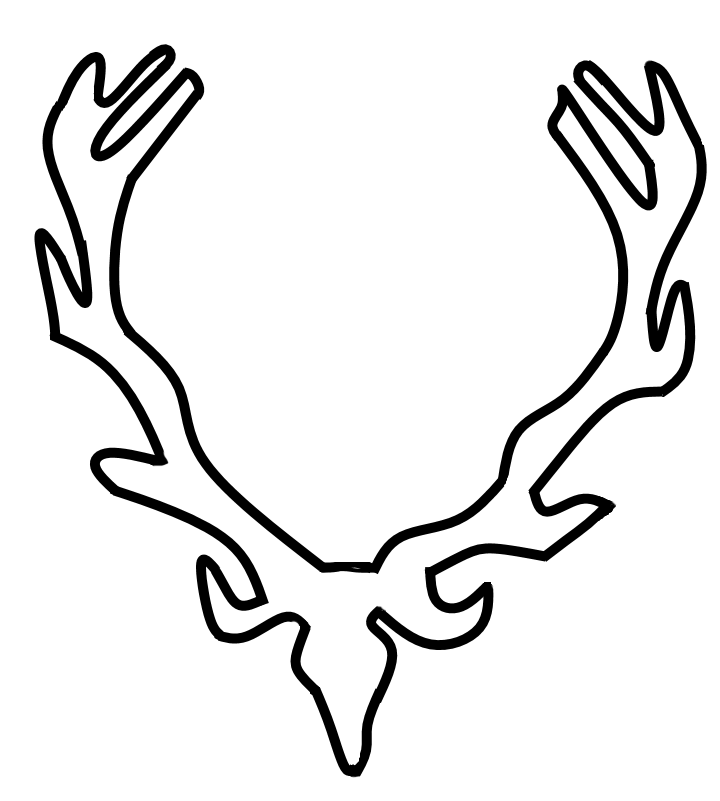
- 118. Jäger Division Vehicle Insignia
- Active: 1941–1945
- Country: Nazi Germany
- Branch: Heer (Wehrmacht)
- Type: Infantry
- Role: light infantry
- Size: Division
- Part of: XV Mountain Corps; V SS Mountain Corps; XXII Mountain Corps; LXVIII Army Corps
- Engagements: World War II: recapture of Olovo on 21 January 1942; Operation Schwarz; Belgrade Offensive; German invasion of Albania; German winter offensive in Albania (1943–1944); Operation Spring Awakening

The 118th Jäger Division (German: 118. Jäger-Division) was a light infantry division of the German Army in World War II. It was formed in April 1943, by the redesignation of the 718th Infantry Division which had itself been formed in April 1941. It was transferred to Yugoslavia in May 1941, to conduct anti partisan and Internal security operations. It took part in the Battle of the Sutjeska in June 1943, and fought partisans in Bosnia before being sent to the Dalmatian coast to guard against Allied landings in the summer of 1944.

It then fought on the Eastern Front in the Vienna offensive during the final months of the war before surrendering to the British in Carinthia in May 1945.

== Formation ==
The 118th Jäger Division was formed under the name 718th Infantry Division following an order dated 16 April 1941, under which each of Germany's fifteen military districts (Wehrkreis) was required to raise two additional infantry regiments for the war effort. Each of these pairs would become its own infantry division, for a total of fifteen divisions that would go on to form the divisions of the fifteenth Aufstellungswelle. The 718th Division consisted of the two regiments raised in Wehrkreis XVIII (Salzburg), the Infantry Regiments 738 and 750. Like the other divisions of the fifteenth wave, the 718th Division consisted of only two rather than the standard three infantry regiments.

== Background ==
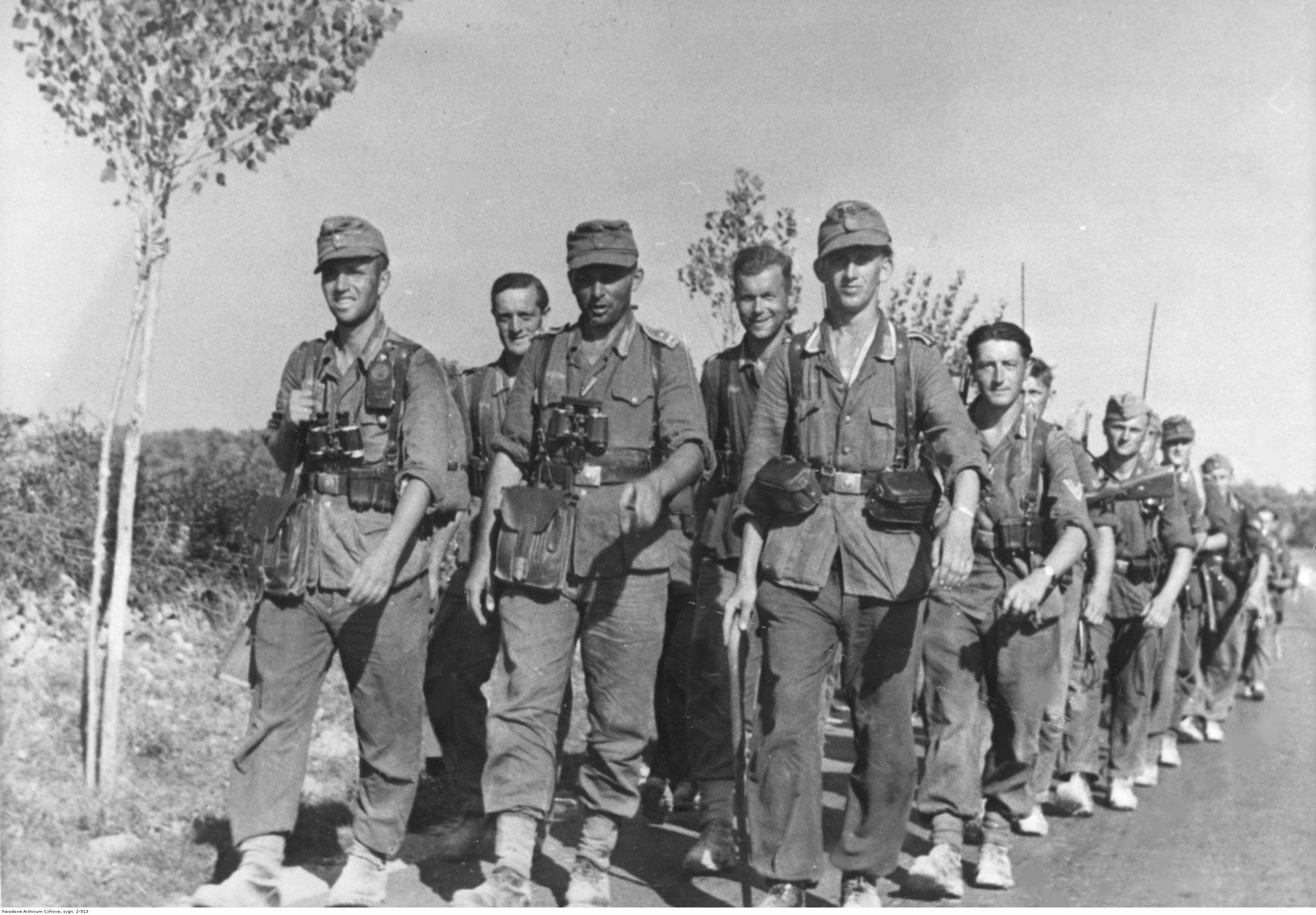
Soldiers of 118th Jäger Division, Bosnia and Herzegovina, September 1943

The main purpose of the German jäger divisions was to fight in adverse terrain where smaller, coordinated formations were more facilely combat capable than the brute force offered by the standard infantry divisions. The jäger divisions were more heavily equipped than mountain division, but not as well armed as a larger infantry formation. In the early stages of the war, they were the interface divisions fighting in rough terrain and foothills as well as urban areas, between the mountains and the plains. The jägers (it means hunters in German), relied on a high degree of training and slightly superior communications, as well as their not inconsiderable artillery support. In the middle stages of the war, as the standard infantry divisions were downsized, the Jäger structure of divisions with two infantry regiments, became the standard table of organization.

== Area of operations ==
- Austria (May 1941 – May 1941)
- Territory of the Military Commander in Serbia and the Independent State of Croatia (May 1941 – April 1943)
- Balkans (April 1943 – July 1944)
- Dalmatia (July 1944 – September 1944)
- Yugoslavia (September 1944 – January 1945)
- Balkans, Hungary and Yugoslavia (January 1945 – May 1945)

== Commanders ==
- Generalleutnant Johann Fortner (3 May 1941 – 14 March 1943)
- Generalleutnant Josef Kübler (14 March 1943 – 10 July 1944)
- Generalmajor Hubertus Lamey (10 July 1944 – 8 May 1945)

== Order of battle ==
- Jäger Regiment 738
- Jäger Regiment 750
- Artillerie Regiment 668
- Aufklärungs (Reconnaissance) Bataillon 118
- Panzerjäger (Tank destroyer) Bataillon 118
- Pionier (Engineer) Bataillon 118
- Funk (Signals) Bataillon 118
