= Dragoslav Račić =

Serbian Chetnik leader

vojvoda Dragoslav Račić
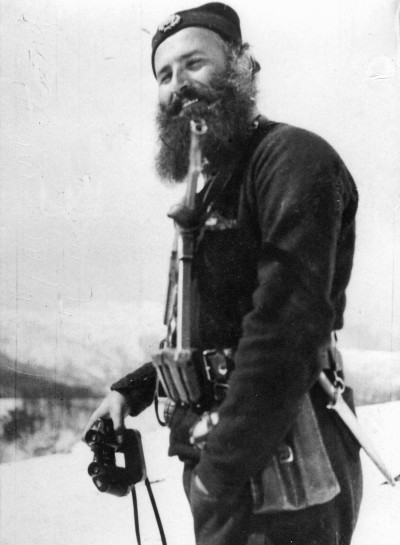
- Born: Dragoslav Miletić; 24 March 1905; Godačica, Serbia
- Died: November 1945 (aged 40); Savković, Yugoslavia (now Serbia)
- Burial place: Unknown
- Spouse: Verica Miletić (m. 1934; died 1937)
- Military career
- Allegiance: Kingdom of Serbia; Kingdom of Yugoslavia
- Branch: Chetniks
- Service years: 1926–1945
- Rank: Captain; Colonel; Voivode
- Units: Cer-Majevica Corps Group; Cer Chetnik Detachment
- Conflicts: World War II in Yugoslavia; Capture of Banja Koviljača; Attack on Šabac; Cleaning Up the Sava Crescent; Battle for Višegrad; Belgrade Offensive

Dragoslav Račić (Serbian Cyrillic: Драгослав Рачић; 24 March 1905 – November 1945) was a Serbian Chetnik military commander holding the rank of colonel and voivode during World War II.

== World War II ==
=== Uprising in Serbia ===
In June 1941, Račić arrived on mountain Cer near Šabac where he designated the place for the headquarters of Chetniks under his command. During the summer of 1941, he organized several military units under his command, first the “Cer company” commanded by Lieutenant Ratko Teodosijević who came from Ravna Gora together with Račić. Then he established the “Čokešina company”, the “Mačva company” (commanded by Lieutenant Nikola Sokić), and the “Machine gun company” commanded by Lieutenant Voja Tufegdžić. The newly established “Prnjavor company” was composed of Serb refugees who escaped from Croatian Ustaše genocide and was a unit within the “Chetnik Cer Detachment”. The Chetnik detachment was a military unit of the operational Royal Yugoslav Army and the commanding officers were active and reserve Yugoslav officers determined to struggle against the enemy using guerilla Chetnik methods.

Two Chetnik detachments participated in the Capture of Banja Koviljača conducted 1–6 September 1941: the Jadar Detachment and the Cer Detachment under command of Račić. The commander of the operation was Nikola Radovanović, a lieutenant general. They were quickly transported from Prnjavor through Loznica and Trbušnica to Mount Gučevo above Banja Koviljača where Račić, commander of the Cer detachment, was informed of the intention of the Jadar Detachment of 3,000 men to attack Banja Koviljača. On 21 September 1941, the Cer Chetnik Detachment commanded by Račić conducted attacks on Šabac. Račić was commander of all forces attacking Šabac, the Chetniks, the Partisans and detachment of Pećanac Chetniks commanded by Budimir Cerski. Even after the first conflicts between Partisans and Chetniks began in September 1941, Račić was praised by official communist organ "Borba" as one of the "good" Chetniks who struggled against the occupying forces alongside communist forces. On 4 October 1941, there was the first "peaceful contact" between rebels in Serbia and German occupying forces when Captain Račić sent a letter to commander of the 10th Company of the 699 German Infantry Regiment in Šabac.

=== Battle of Višegrad ===
Around a thousand Chetniks from Serbia under command of Dragoslav Račić participated in Chetnik operations in Eastern Bosnia, however it remains unexplored did they and to which extent participate in massacres following Battle of Višegrad (5 October 1943). According to existing documents Račić's Chetniks haven't been involved in fighting for Višegrad, they were located in Višegradska Banja, 7 km distance from the town. Dušan Trbojević, officer of Pocerina Corpus, says that Račić's forces entered Višegrad on the same day JVuO captured it and that they remained in it for seven days. Our entrance in liberated Višegrad, which still smelled of gunpowder, was unforgettable with streets covered in blood on which our enemies lied. Trbojević is silent about large number of civilians killed by Chetnik after the capture of the town. It is known, on basis of Trbojević's claims, that Račić's Chetniks were present in Višegrad during three day massacre, however extent of their involvement in these crimes remains unknown.

=== Defence against Partisan incursion into Serbia ===
On 7 May 1944, Račić and other officers from HQ of Cer Corps participated on the meeting with representatives of Nedić regime and officers of Serbian State Guard in Monastery Radovašnica to discuss how to protect Serbia from Communist terror. Račić emphasized that the main task of his unit is to "protect Serbia from communists". Račić proposed that Germans should provide his unit with 100 machine guns and 1,000 guns, but this proposal was futile because Germans did not provided him with requested arms, and situation on the field remained as it was.

During period of May 1944 Chetnik terror culminated in Šabac (Podrinje) Okrug. Chetniks under Račić's command killed 7 villagers at Voćnjak, near Loznica, in two instances, on 7 and 11 May. In middle of May, Chetniks killed 5 villagers of Lipolist and 9 young men from Komirić. Young men were killed by Račić himself, according to witnesses of this crime. Another killing of 9 villagers happened in Čokešina in the end of May.

In 1944, when strong communist-led Partisan forces entered Serbia from Bosnia, Račić was appointed as commander of all Chetnik operations in Serbia. The group of Chetnik Corps under his command and group of Corps under command of Dragutin Keserović accepted the main blow of communist attack during the Battle for Serbia. On 23 July 1944, the communist controlled forces attacked Nova Varoš and captured it. This was the signal for Tito to order urgent movement of Partisan Operational groups of Divisions into Serbia with main goal to destroy military forces and political organization of nationalists. The main blow of communist controlled forces across Kopaonik was received only by Chetnik units.

=== Failed attempt to gain German support for unification of all anti-communist forces in Serbia ===
When Račić realized that Chetniks would not be able to resist communist forces, he proposed to Draža Mihailović on 10 August to approach to negotiate with Germans. When Mihailović approved his proposal, Račić organized a meeting with German representatives headed by Rittmeister Von Vrede in Topola on 11 August. Račić proposed the Germans to organize unified anti-communist front of Serb national forces composed of Chetniks, Serbian State Guard and Ljotićevci, insisting that Chetniks will not wear German uniforms and Mihailović remain illegal. The meeting did not have any results because the German representatives were not authorized to make important decisions.

Probably on 15 August 1944, Mihailović met General Milan Nedić on the meeting organized on initiative and insisting of Račić, although Mihailović reluctantly agreed to attend it. The meeting was organized late at night in village Ražana and no written records exist from this meeting. In his later testimonies Nedić stated that he explained Mihailović that Germans will soon leave Serbia and that strong communist forces will occupy Serbia, so he proposes to unite all national forces to defend it. Mihailović agreed with Nedić and explained that he have enough men to defend Serbia but not enough arms and ammunition. Nedić promised to try to get support from Germans and approached to Hermann Neubacher who supported the idea but failed to gain Hitler's approval for it, because Hitler insisted that his support to Serbia could endanger Croatia.

=== Retreat to Bosnia ===
On 21 October 1944 in Ivanjica, Račić organized a conference of all commanders of the Chetnik Corps and Groups of Corps to decide about their further actions. They decided to join the Chetnik command in Bosnia based on the unrealistic hope that the Allies would land on the Adriatic coast of Yugoslavia. On 4 May 1945 Račić's troops took Fojnica from the Partisans, inflicting heavy casualties on the 21st Partisan Brigade. A number of captured Partisans were burnt at the stake and Račić's troops pillaged and burnt Fojnica to the ground.

Račić was killed in Autumn 1945 near Krupanj as an outlaw.

== Legacy ==
In 1998, Dušan Trbojević, a Chetnik lieutenant in the Cer Corps commanded by Račić published his memoirs about the corps and Račić during World War II titled Cersko-Majevička grupa korpusa, 1941-1945: pod komandom pukovnika Dragoslava S. Račića.

== Sources ==
- Tomasevich, Jozo (1975). War and Revolution in Yugoslavia, 1941–1945: The Chetniks. Stanford: Stanford University Press. ISBN 978-0-8047-0857-9.
- Kumm, Otto (1978). Vorwärts, Prinz Eugen!: Geschichte d. 7. SS-Freiwilligen-Division "Prinz Eugen". Munin. ISBN 978-3-921242-34-6.
- Milovanović, Nikola (1991). Draža Mihailović. Belgrade: Pegaz.
- Matić, Milan B.; Vesović, Milan (1995). Ravnogorska ideja u štampi i propagandi četničkog pokreta u Srbiji 1941-1944. ISI. ISBN 9788674030639.
- Jončić, Koča (1985). Narodni ustanak i borbe za Kraljevo 1941. godine: zbornik radova naučnog skupa. Narodna knj. ISBN 9788633100014.
- Karchmar, Lucien (1973). Draz̆a Mihailović and the Rise of the C̆etnik Movement, 1941-1942. Department of History, Stanford University.
- Kazimirović, Vasa (1995). Srbija i Jugoslavija: 1914-1945. Prizma. ISBN 9788670840010.
- Dimitrijević, Bojan (2014). Vojska Nedićeve Srbije: Oružane snage Srpske vlade 1941–1945. Službeni glasnik.
- Cvejić, Nebojša (2006). "Kod 21: Časopis za Kulturu i Umetnost". Kod 21: Časopis za Kulturu i Umetnost. Šabačko pozorište. ISSN 2466-3212.
- Radanović, Milan (2016). Kazna i Zločin: Snage kolaboracije u Srbiji. Rosa Luxemburg Stiftung.
