= Capture of Banja Koviljača =

1941 battle in German-occupied Serbia

- Part of the Uprising in Serbia during World War II in Yugoslavia
Date	1–6 September 1941
Location	Banja Koviljača, Territory of the Military Commander in Serbia (now in Serbia)
Result	Chetnik-Partisan victory

Belligerents
Chetniks; Partisans	(Nazi Germany) Germany; Independent State of Croatia

Commanders and leaders
(Chetniks) Chetniks; Nikola Radovanović; Bogdan Drljača; Georgije Bojić; Lazar Savić; Dragoslav Račić; Obren Popović †; Partisans; Aleksandar Stanković; Mika Mitrović	(Nazi Germany) Johann Fortner (Independent State of Croatia) Mate Rupčić (Independent State of Croatia) Grum

Units involved
(Chetniks) Chetniks; Jadar Detachment; Cer Detachment; Partisans; 4th company Pocerski Battalion; Podrinski Division	(Nazi Germany) 9th company (Nazi Germany) 12th company of 3rd Battalion (Nazi Germany) 718th Infantry Division (Independent State of Croatia) 3rd regiment (Independent State of Croatia) 4th regiment of the Croatian Home Guard battalion from Zvornik and Tuzla

Strength
3,000 Chetniks	(Nazi Germany) 300 Germans (Independent State of Croatia) 300 Ustaše

Casualties and losses
4 killed 4 wounded	Unknown

The Capture of Banja Koviljača (1–6 September 1941) was a long battle fought by cooperating forces of Chetniks and Yugoslav Partisans against German forces. On 1 September 1941, the insurgents attacked German soldiers who were garrisoned in an outpost at Banja Koviljača in the German-occupied territory of Serbia. The battle reflected skillful command by leaders of the uprising.

== Background ==
In August 1941, insurgent activity in the German-occupied territory of Serbia increased. There were 242 attacks on the German Army and gendarmerie posts, railroads, telephone wires, mines and industrial facilities during that month. Twenty-two German soldiers were killed and seventeen were wounded. In the same month, Draža Mihailović ordered the mobilisation of Chetnik units.

On 31 August 1941, the Chetniks captured Loznica and Zavlaka village and then, on 1 September 1941, they captured Zajača, a mining town.

Two Chetnik detachments participated in the capture of Banja Koviljača: the Jadar Detachment and the Cer Detachment. The commander of the operation was Nikola Radovanović, a lieutenant general. The Cer Detachment conducted attacks on Šabac in order to distract the Germans in Banja Koviljača. They were quickly transported from Prnjavor through Loznica and Trbušnica to Mount Gučevo above Banja Koviljača where Račić, commander of the Cer detachment, was informed of the intention of the Jadar Detachment of 3,000 men to attack Banja Koviljača.

The Jadar Detachment was supported by two companies of Partisans that belonged to the Pocerski Battalion, Podrinski Partisan Division. One of the companies (the 4th) was commanded by Aleksandar Lala Stanković. The other, an assault force, was commanded by Mika Mitrović. The German soldiers in Banja Koviljača were accommodated in the kursalon (the music hall) and in the hotels Podrinje, Herzegovina and Dalmatia. Between 30 and 40 German soldiers were positioned in a sanatorium on the hill above Banja Koviljača. These soldiers were part of the 718th Infantry Division (Wehrmacht 118th Jäger Division). The divisional headquarters were in Banja Luka and the divisional command post was in Zvornik, both located in the Independent State of Croatia. Hence, the divisional commander first approached the Croatian Minister of the Armed Forces, Slavko Kvaternik, for support.

Mate Rupčić (commander of the NDH Military on the Serbian front) gave support with the Croatian Home Guard 3rd and 4th Regiments from Zvornik and Tuzla, commanded by Colonel Grum.

== The battle ==
On 1 September, the Jadar Detachment under the command of Captain Bogdan Drljača and reserve Lieutenant George Bojić attacked the 3rd Battalion of the German 718th division. German soldiers at the sanatorium retreated to the town and dug a trench and improvised a bunker. Others made a strong defensive fortification with barbed wire and machine gun nests. The German soldiers offered fierce resistance and successfully repelled the attackers and held the town whilst waiting for reinforcements.

On 2 September, the 3rd Battalion of the 738th German Regiment had to retreat to the east from its position near Koviljača. On the same day, a German reconnaissance aircraft was damaged above Loznica. During the night of 2 September, allied forces numbering between 5,000 and 6,000 Partisans of the Valjevo Detachment and around 1,000 Chetniks under the command of Martinović and Vlado Zečević, a priest, attacked the neighboring town of Krupanj. German reinforcements from Valjevo tried to reach Krupanj and Koviljača with support of the German air force but could not break through the allied lines.

On 3 September, the German soldiers in Banja Koviljača received artillery support from the Independent State of Croatia (Nezavisna Država Hrvatska, NDH) and support from the Luftwaffe. Two Junkers Ju 87s dropped twenty-four bombs on Chetnik positions. After this barrage, Croatian Home Guard forces of battalion strength crossed the Drina River near Zvornik. They attacked the left wing of the Chetnik-held slopes of Gučevo, west of Banja Koviljača. The Chetniks under the command of Lieutenant Lazar Savić were suppressed by the Germans and NDH forces who crossed the Drina at Kozluk. Lieutenant George Bojić returned on the same day with reinforcements to halt the progress of German and NDH forces and joined with the Cer Detachment under the command of Dragoslav Račić.

On the night of the 4 September, large battles were fought. On 5 September, according to Vladimir Dedijer, the Chetniks requested support from Partisan forces (Mačva Detachment and Valjevo Detachment). These detachments marched towards Banja Koviljača. When Partisan units reached Tršić they received news that Banja Koviljača had been captured.

The German soldiers erected high voltage wires in front of their line. Sergeant Obren Popović, not knowing this, approached the critical German position at the Hotel Hercegovina. Popović led the Chetnik men with a bomb in his hand. The Chetnik men ran onto the high-voltage wire and all were killed.

On the night of 5 September, fighting continued. The Chetnik forces reached the Hotel Hercegovina in a decisive onslaught by jumping over the high-voltage wires and throwing grenades through the windows of the hotel. There was panic among the Germans, who rapidly retreated with the NDH to Zvornik and were then evacuated by air.

== Aftermath ==
After the capture of the town, the Chetniks celebrated the birthday of King Peter II of Yugoslavia. A prison camp to contain captured German prisoners was opened in Planinica village. The Chetniks and the Partisans established command posts in Loznica and Banja Koviljača. Remaining German forces were trapped in Šabac and Valjevo, encircled by the allied forces. Victories at Loznica, Banja Koviljača, Zavlaka, and Krupanj released most of western Serbia, including Loznica, Koviljača and Krupanj, from Axis occupation.

The Cer Detachment commanded by Račić attacked German positions in Šabac. They penetrated the town but could not capture it. The Chetniks joined with forces in Šumadija to attack Valjevo. The consolidated Chetnik forces advanced to the valley of Western Morava and liberated Čačak, Kraljevo and Kruševac.
