= Racic =

Racic may refer to:

- Račić (disambiguation), several meanings
- Racić
