= Darja Korobkina =

Darja Alexandrovna Korobkina (died October 2, 1914) was a Russian-born nurse and volunteer of Serbia's Fifth Infantry Regiment of the Drina Division during World War I.

== Biography ==
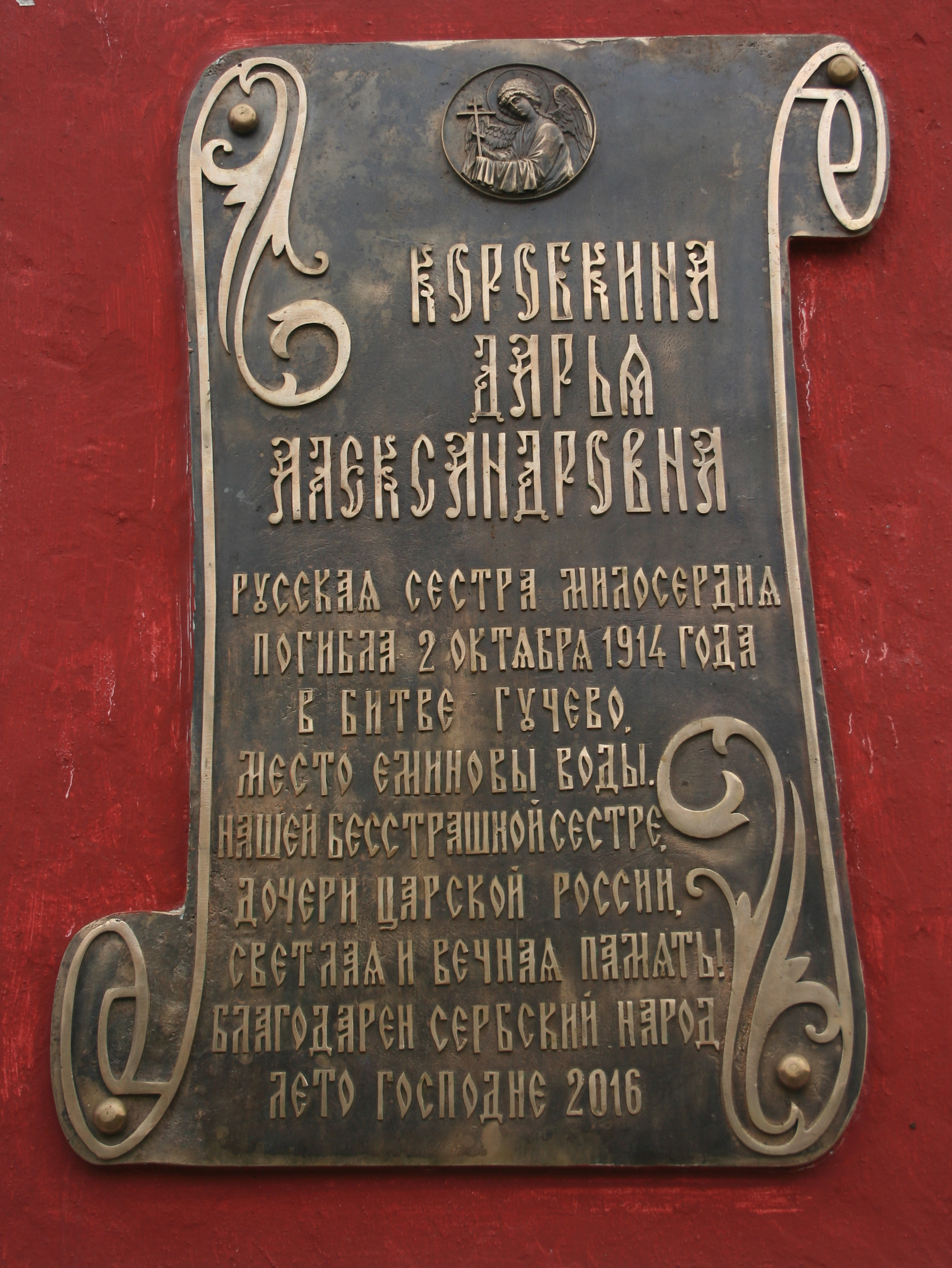
Memorial plaque on the building of the old school in Bacevci

Darja Alexandrovna Korobkina was born in St. Petersburg, Russia. Her bravery and tireless work during World War I as a nurse and volunteer of Serbia's Fifth Infantry Regiment were mentioned in dispatches. She worked “day and night” and was able to attend to 120 soldiers in one day. She died on October 2, 1914, during heavy fighting at Eminove Vode, on Mt. Gučevo.
