= Račić (surname) =

Račić (Serbian Cyrillic: Рачић) is a Serbo-Croatian family name.

Račići are mostly of Croatian ethnicity – in Croatia, about 800 persons in 250 households bear this name – and only rarely Serbs (from the Banja Luka area, BiH) or Bosniaks (from Cazin, BiH).

Notable people with this name include:

- Aleksandra Račić (born 1990), Serbian basketball player
- Dragoslav Račić (1905–1945), Serbian military commander
- Jakša Račić (1868–1943), Yugoslav National Party politician
- Josip Račić (1885–1908), Croatian painter
- Krešo Račić (1932–1994), Croatian hammer thrower
- Marko Račič (1920–2022), Slovenian track and field athlete
- Puniša Račić (1886–1944), Montenegrin Serb Chetnik leader
- Stevan Račić (born 1984), Serbian footballer
- Uroš Račić (born 1998), Serbian footballer

== See also ==
- Račić and Račići, two villages in Bosnia and Herzegovina bearing the same name (singular and plural)
- Racić (surname)
