= Račić =

Račić may refer to:

- Račić (surname), a Slavic surname
- Račić, Bosnia and Herzegovina, a village near Bihać
