= Racić =

Racić is a Serbo-Croatian surname.

It may refer to:

- Bojana Racić, former vocalist in the Serbian rock band Cactus Jack (band)|Cactus Jack
- Ljubiša Racić, former guitarist in the Yugoslav rock bands Formula 4 and Bijelo Dugme
- Zoran Racić, Serbian retired footballer

== See also ==
- Račić (surname)
