= Godačica =

Coordinates: 43°46′N 20°51′E

Godačica Годачица (Serbian)
- Village (Selo)
- Interactive map of Godačica
- Country: Serbia
- District: Raška
- Municipality: Kraljevo

Population (2011)
  - Total: 909
- Time zone: UTC+1 (CET)
  - Summer (DST): UTC+2 (CEST)

Godačica is a village situated in Kraljevo municipality in Serbia.
