= Banja Koviljača =

Banja Koviljača Бања Ковиљача (Serbian)
- Town
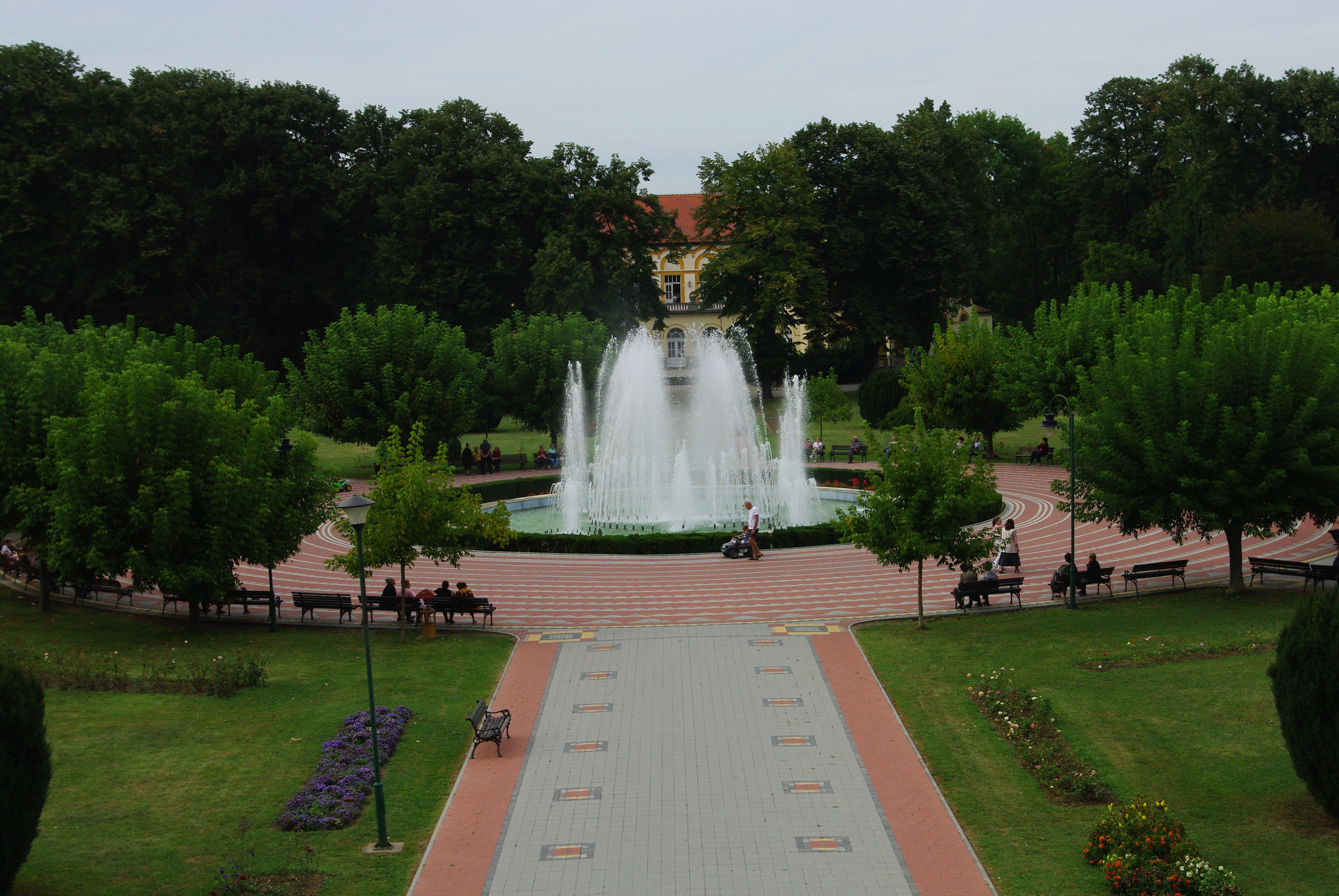
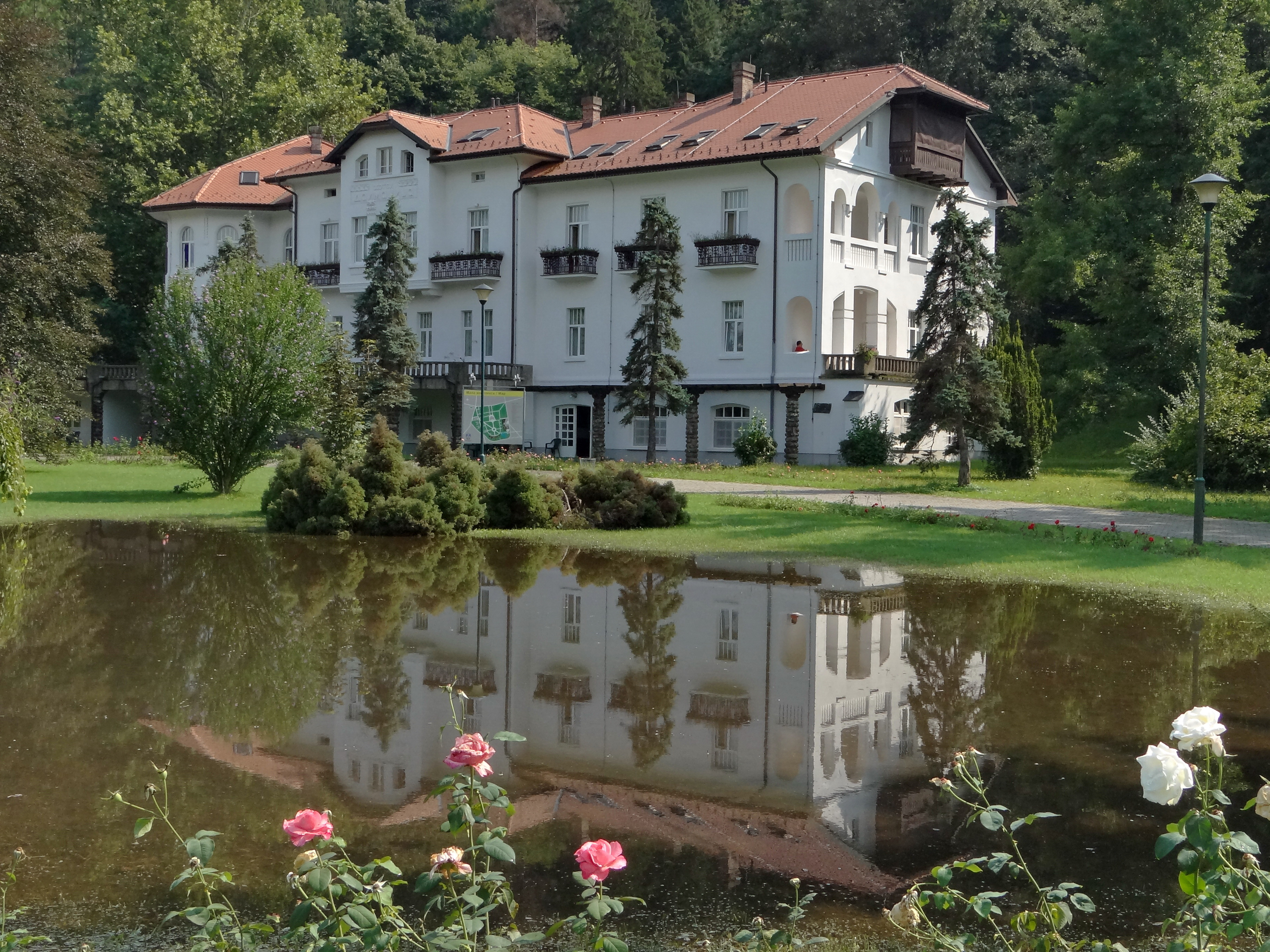
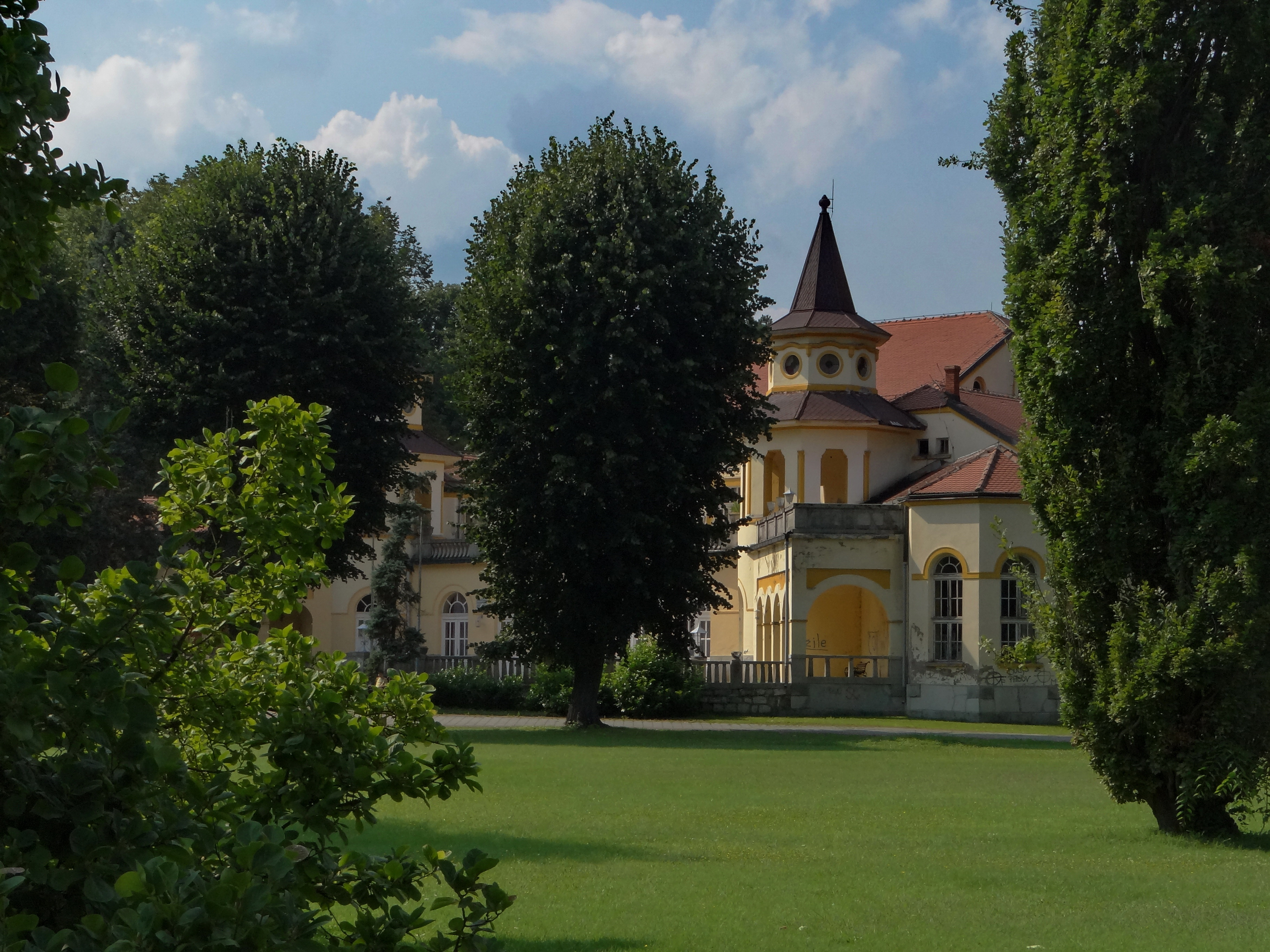
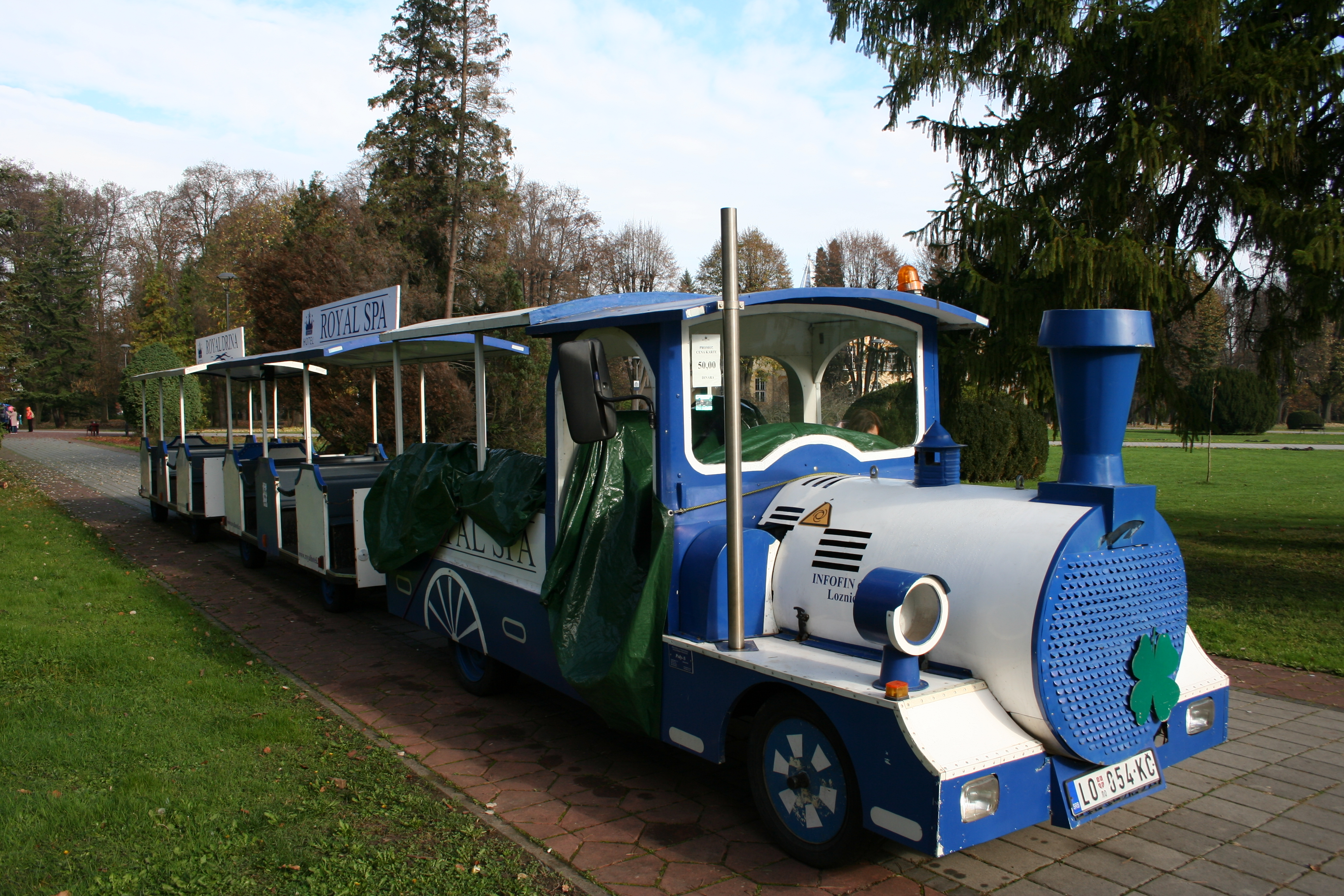
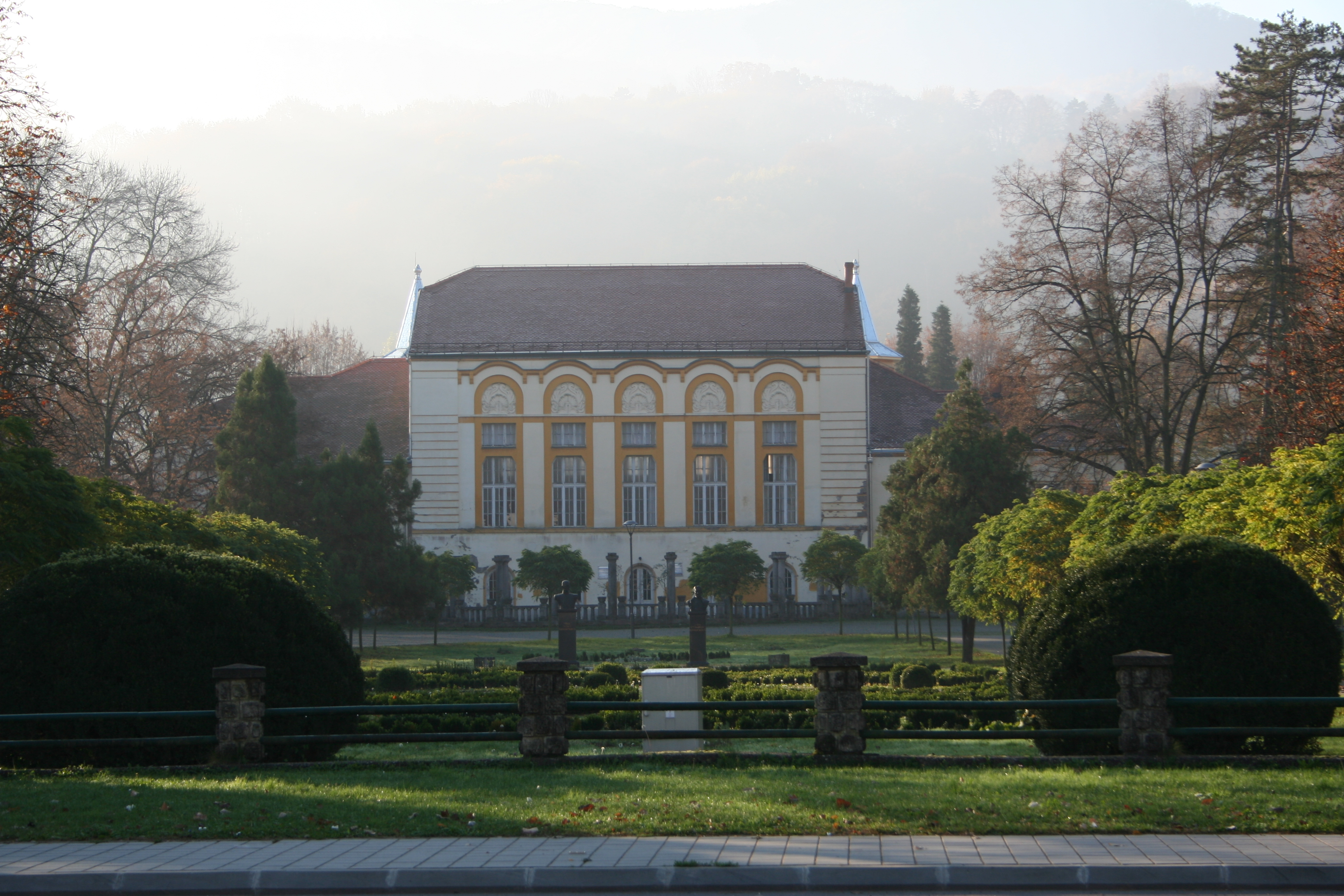
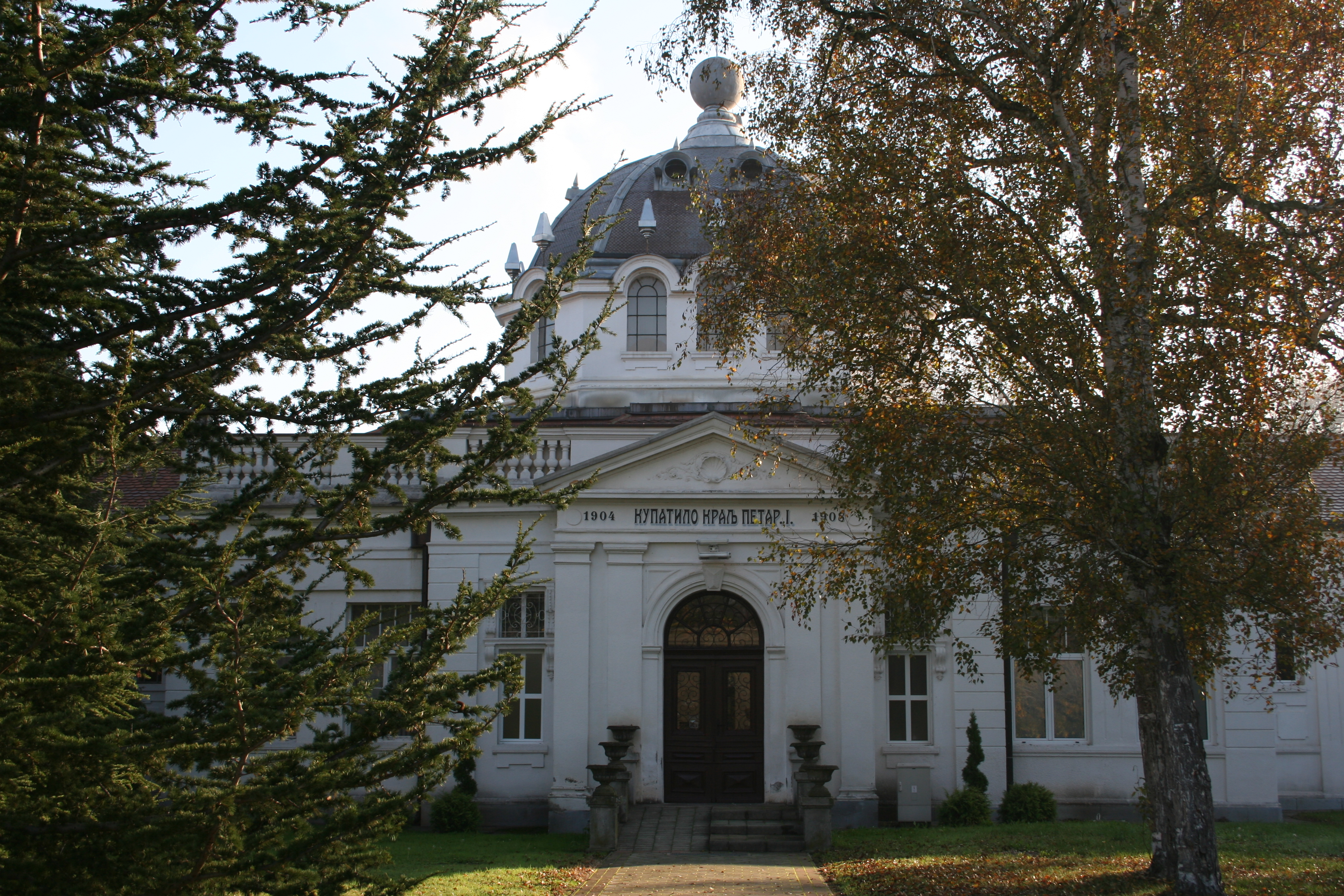
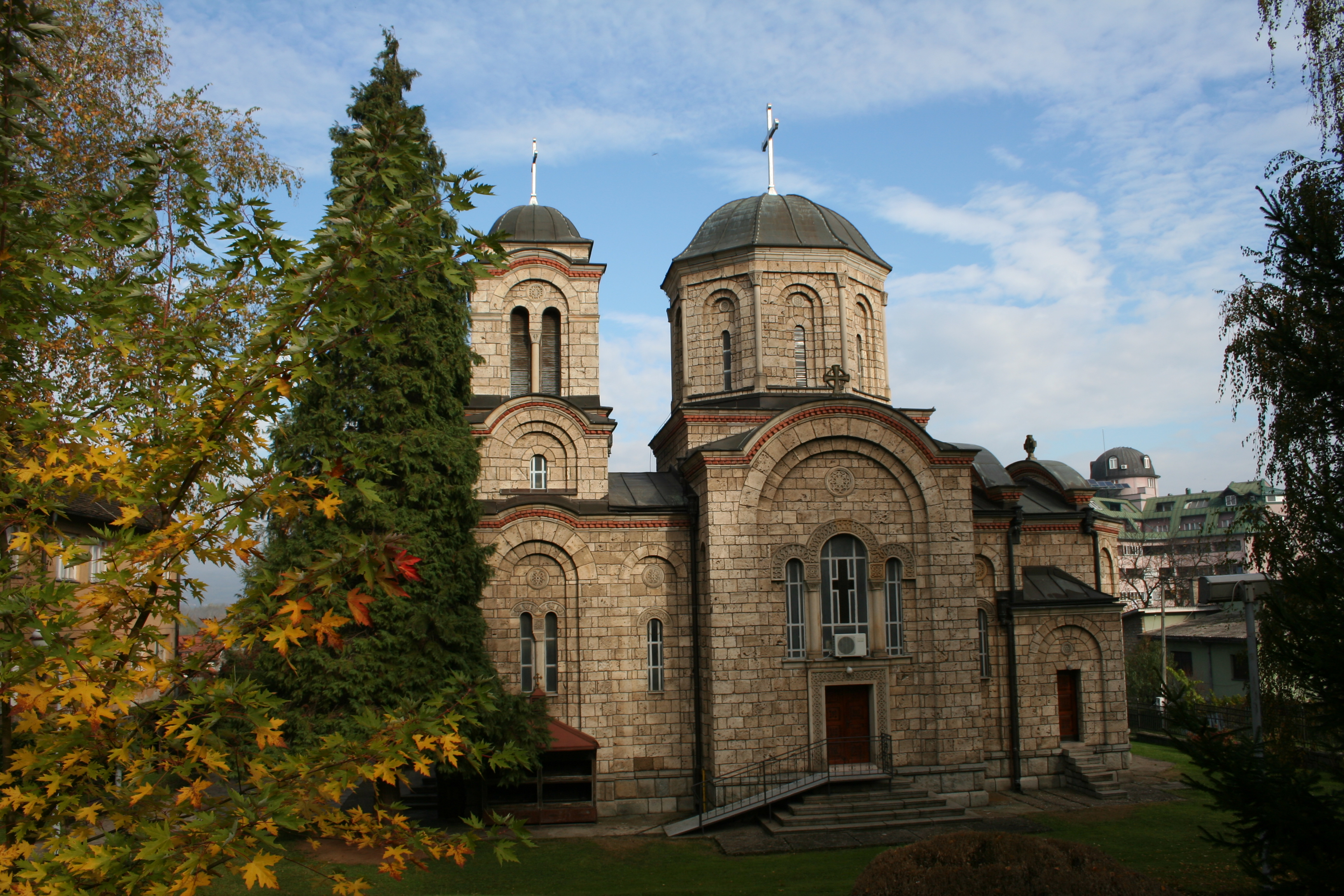
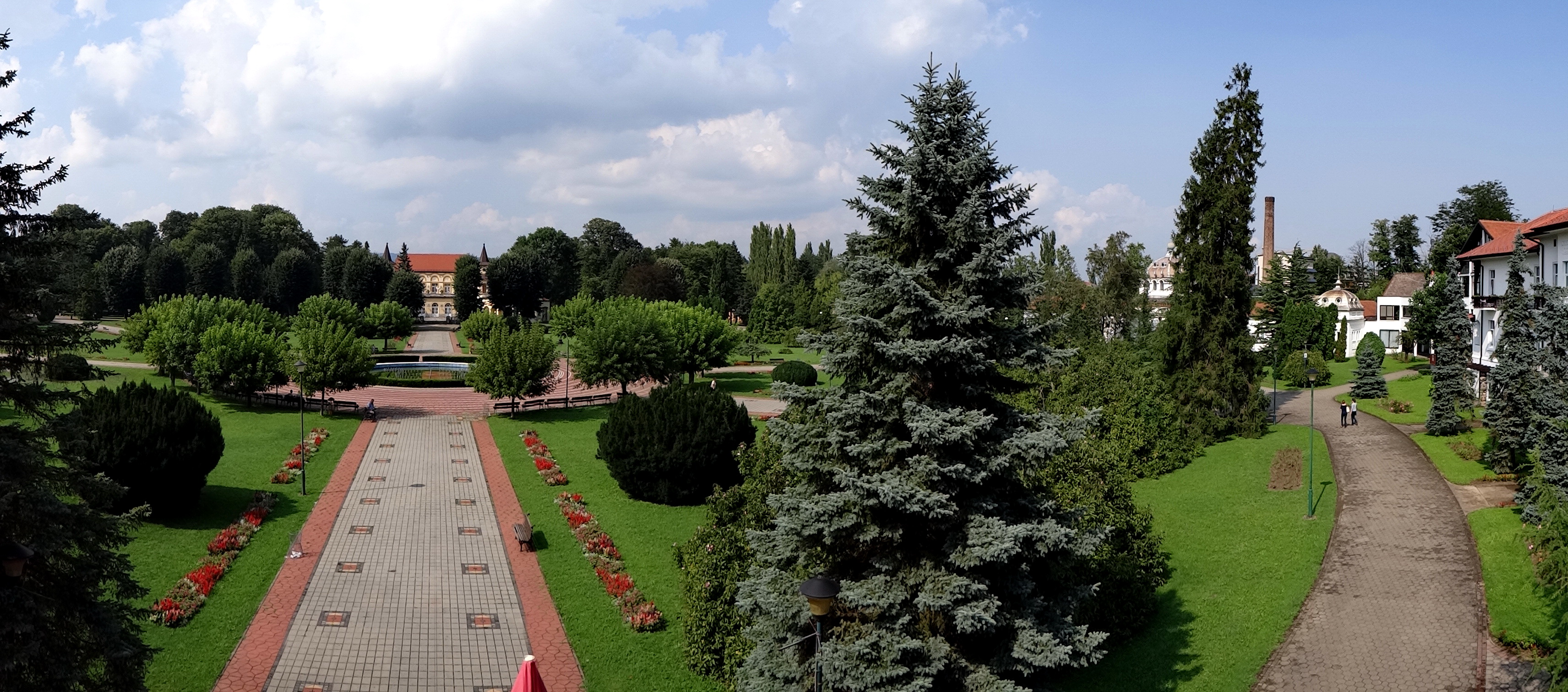

- Location within Serbia
- Coordinates: 44°31′N 19°09′E
- Country: Serbia
- District: Mačva District
- Municipality: Loznica

Government
  - Mayor: Zoran Đurić

Area
  - Total: 13.22 km^{2} (5.10 sq mi)
- Elevation: 128 m (420 ft)

Population
  - Total: 5,151
  - Density: 389.6/km^{2} (1,009/sq mi)
- (2011 census)
- Postal code: 15316
- Area code: 015
- Vehicle registration: LO
- Website: www.banjakoviljaca.rs

Banja Koviljača (Serbian Cyrillic: Бања Ковиљача, pronounced [bâɲa koʋǐʎatʃa]) is a popular tourist spot and spa town located in the city of Loznica, Serbia. Situated on the west border of Serbia by the Drina River and 137 kilometres (85 mi) from Belgrade, it is the oldest spa town in Serbia. As of 2011 census, it has 5,151 inhabitants.

== Name ==
Banja Koviljača is named after the plant kovilje (Stipa pennata) or feather grass, "banja" being the Serbian word for spa. It is also known as Kraljevska Banja ("The Royal Spa").

== Features ==
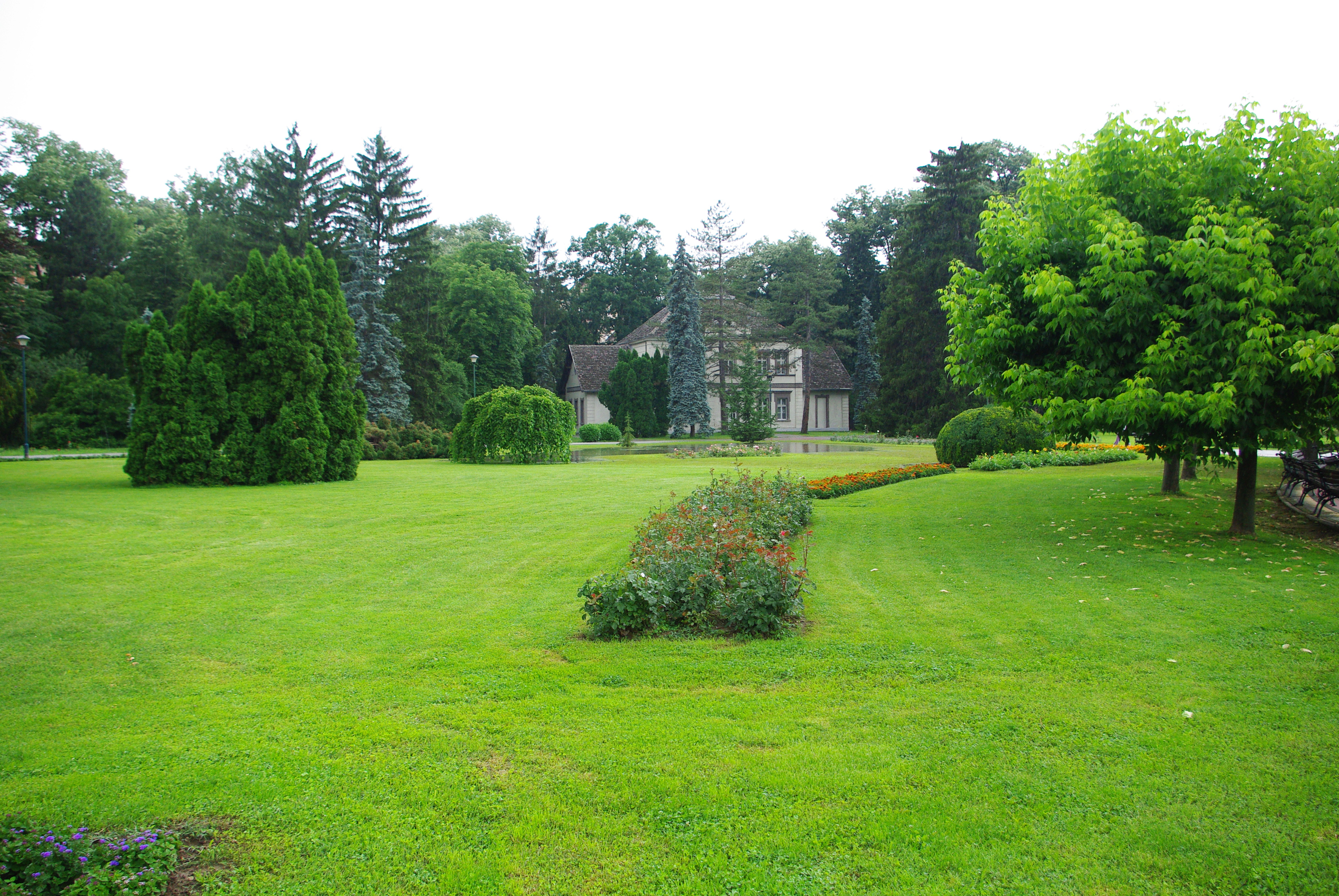
Park in Banja Koviljaca

Banja Koviljača has a number of sulfuric and iron-bearing thermal mineral springs, ranging from 21 to 38 degrees Celsius in temperature. Patients drink and bathe in these waters, which are also used for the preparation of mud packs.

The location of the spa was chosen for its proximity to useful natural elements: the Drina river, which can be forded; the wooded mountain Gučevo, which served as shelter from enemies; the plains, which supplied food; and the water, which was (and still is) considered to have medicinal properties.

== History ==
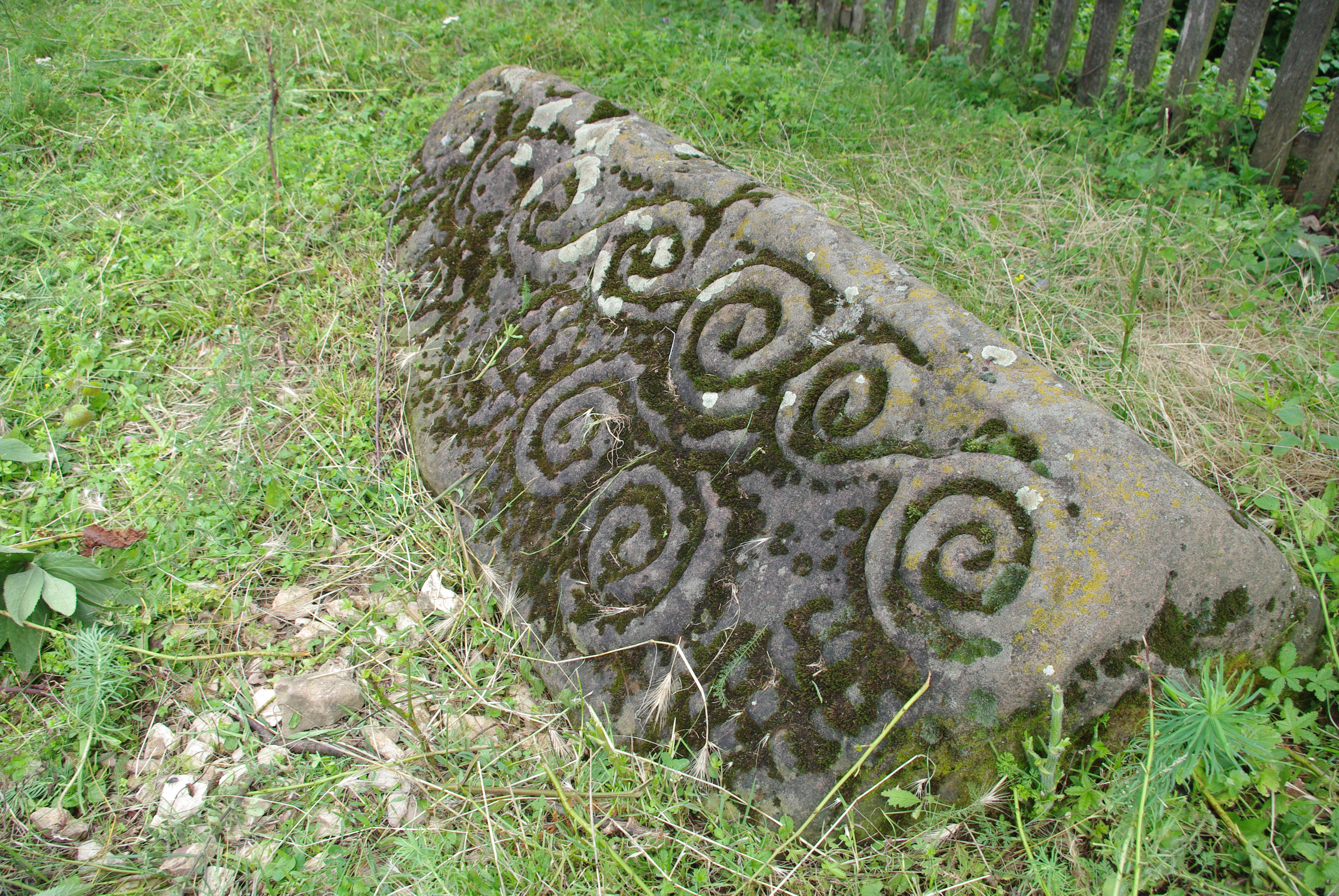
Roman stone near Banja Koviljaca, Koviljkin grad

Originally known as Koviljkin grad, it was built by the Romans and there are some claims that the name of this Roman settlement is "Genzis", but it was never confirmed. The first document mentioning the spa was written in 1533.

In the 18th century, Turks from Mačva and Podrinje came to visit this region. Some documents state that in 1720, Turks from the city of Zvornik built a medical bathroom for women named the "Stinking Spa", due to the sulfuric water from the springs. A legend states that a caravan had been passing in the area when he had to leave his horse behind because it was exhausted, and rolling in the mud. It is said that when the caravan returned, the horse had been cured.

Vuk Stefanović Karadžić, wrote about the sulfuric puddle and cold mineral springs when describing this region in 1827. According to Karadžic, its real name, Spa, was derived from the old town, fortress, which had been built on the hill above the current Spa. According to Kanić, Spa received its name from a very popular plant kovilja (Stipa pennata) which grows on nearby slopes and hills.

The first chemical analysis of the water was performed by the chemist Pavle Ilić in the year 1855. The first guest house was built in 1858 with ten rooms. In 1867, under the order of the Prince Mihajlo Obrenović, the spa won state protection.

Development of Banja Koviljača began on 1 August 1898, when a law was passed opening it to the people of the Podrinje district for exploration. Intensive development occurred until 1930, when Koviljača's jurisdiction was changed to Drinska Banovina, the capital in Sarajevo.

Kur-salon, entertainment hall considered to be the most impressive building in the spa, was built in 1932 by order of King Aleksandar Karađorđević.

Until 1970 this sanatorium operated under the name “Natural Sanatorium Spa Koviljača”. From 1970 to 1998, it was known as the “Institute for dissipated and post-traumatic conditions”.

In 1980, a facility for therapy and amenities was added. Since 1998 it has been called the “Special hospital for rehabilitation Spa Koviljača”. Medical services are provided by physicians of the Institute of Discopathy.

Koviljača Spa is one of the locations where Republic of Serbia has a Centre for Asylum Seekers. The center is a dedicated organization within the Commissariat for Refugees of Serbia. The centre was opened in 1965. and was used for accommodation of asylum seekers from South America and Eastern Europe until 1991. Between 1991. and 2006. it was used for accommodation of refugees from Bosnia & Herzegovina and Croatia. The centre was renovated in 2006, and since 2007. was used to accommodate asylum seekers under the auspices of the UNHCR.

== Geographical setting ==
Gučevo is a wooded mountain which rises above the Banja Koviljača Spa to the south. The mountain extends from northwest to southeast and from Koviljača to the mountain Boranja. It is 15 kilometers long. The peak of the Gučevo Mountain is Crni Vrh, and its altitude is 779 m above sea level. Mount Gučevo is composed mainly of limestone and sand.

In the past, there was a terrain fissure on the mountain, which was significant to the occurrence of thermo-mineral waters. The mountain of Gučevo has many clear water springs which grow into smaller brooks overhung by high beech forests. The river Drina dominates the area and meanders between Mačva and Semberija.

== Events ==
- International folk festival of European dances - August, Banja Koviljača, Loznica
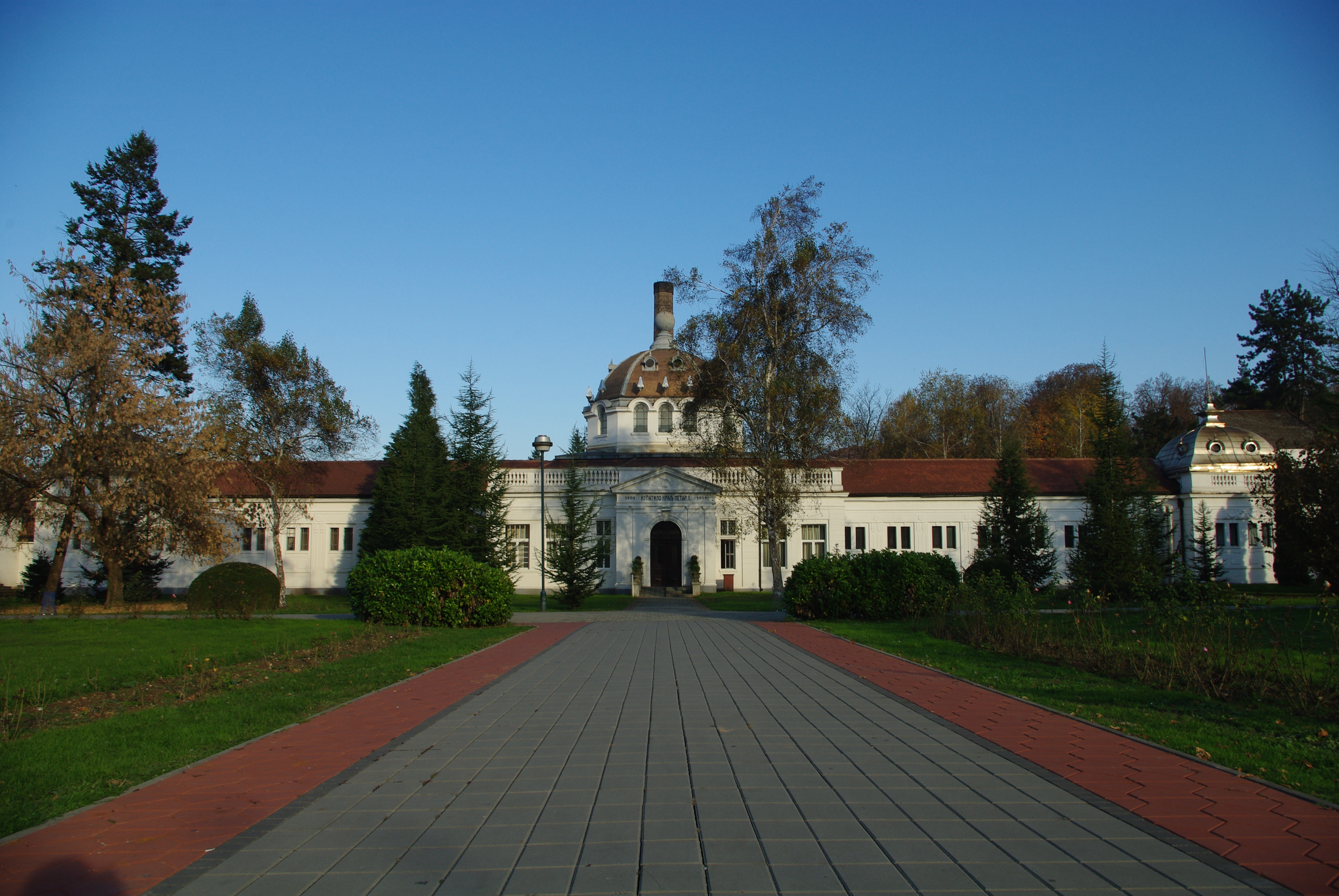
King Peter's bath in Banja Koviljaca

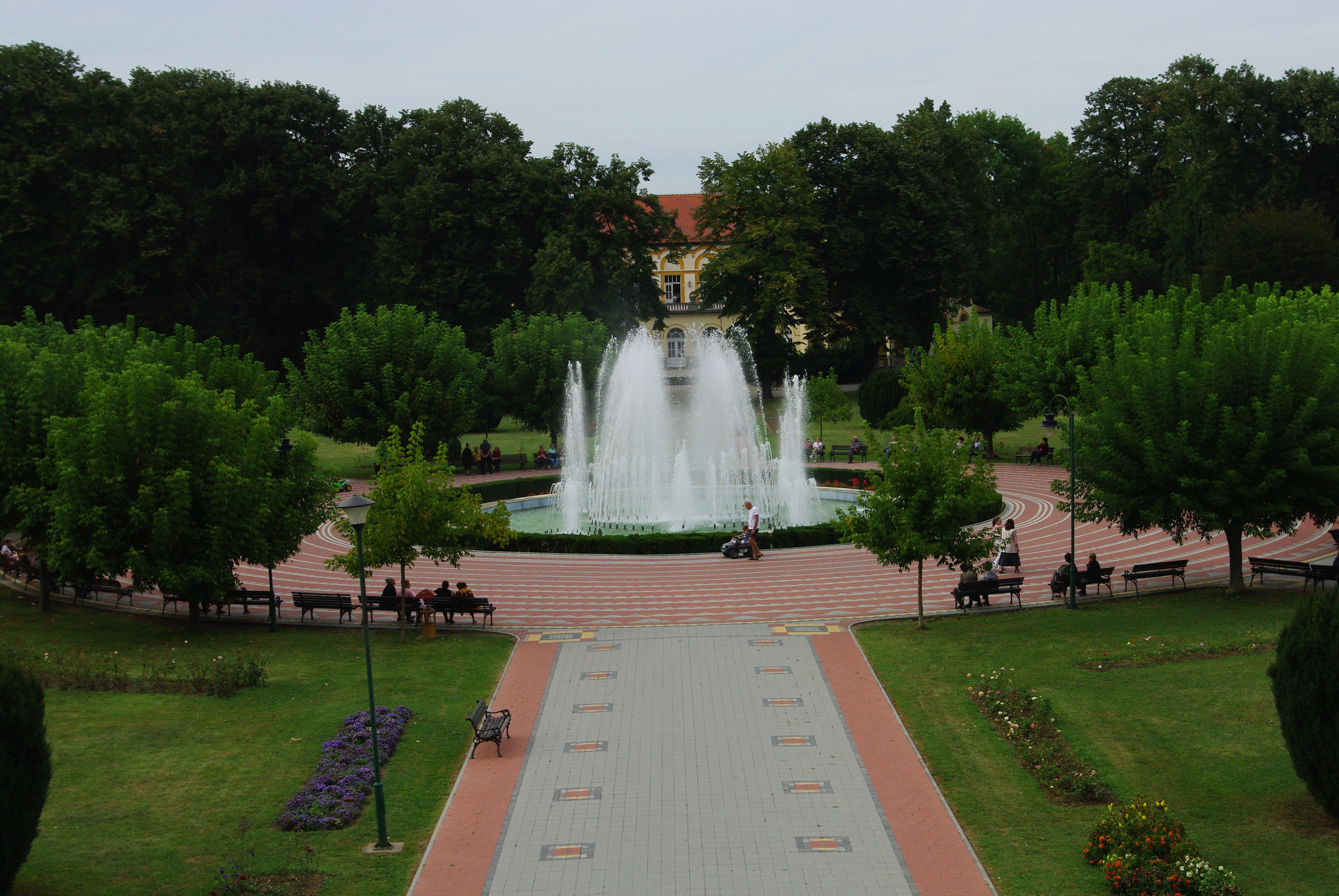
Fountain in Banja Koviljaca

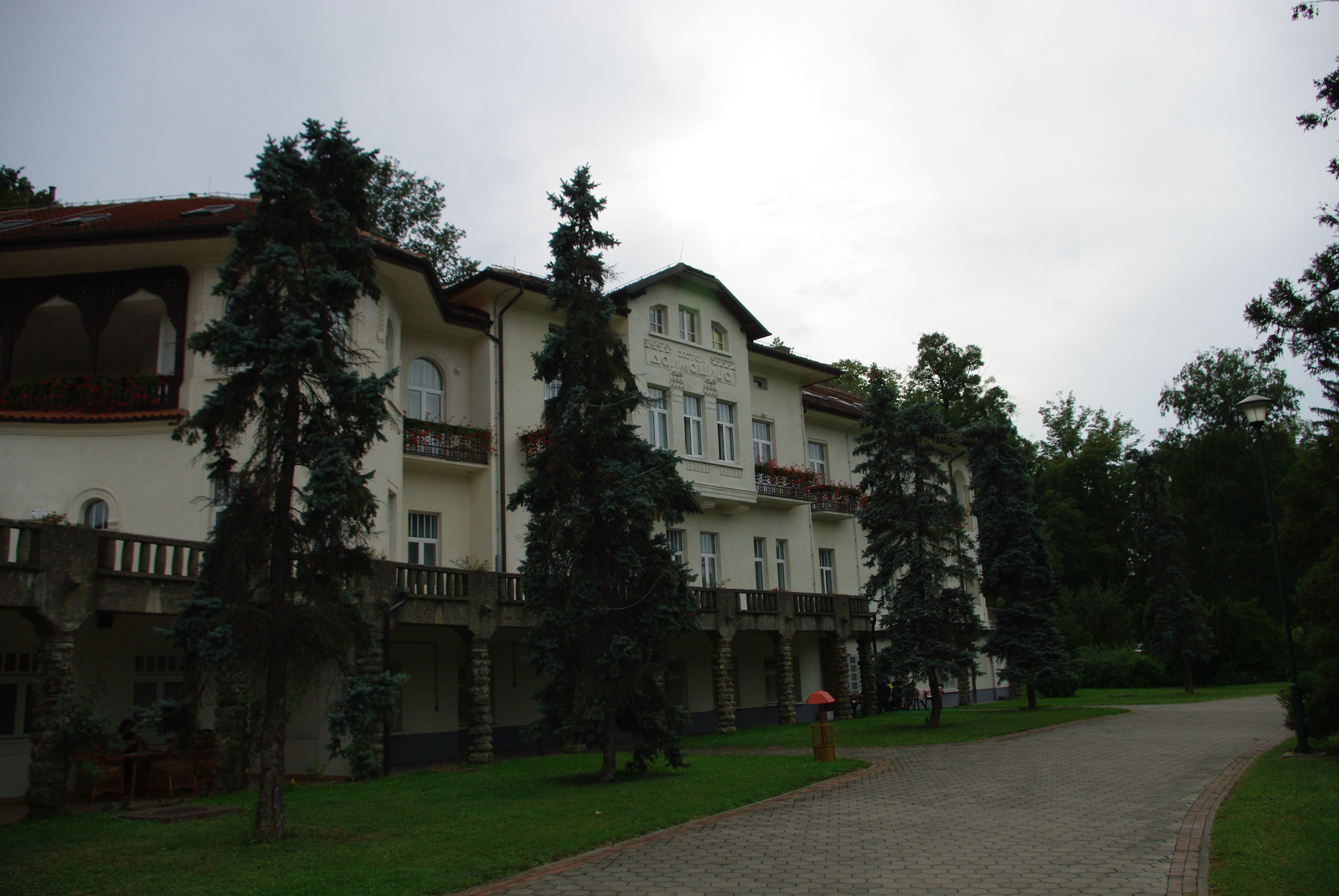
Hotel Dalmatia

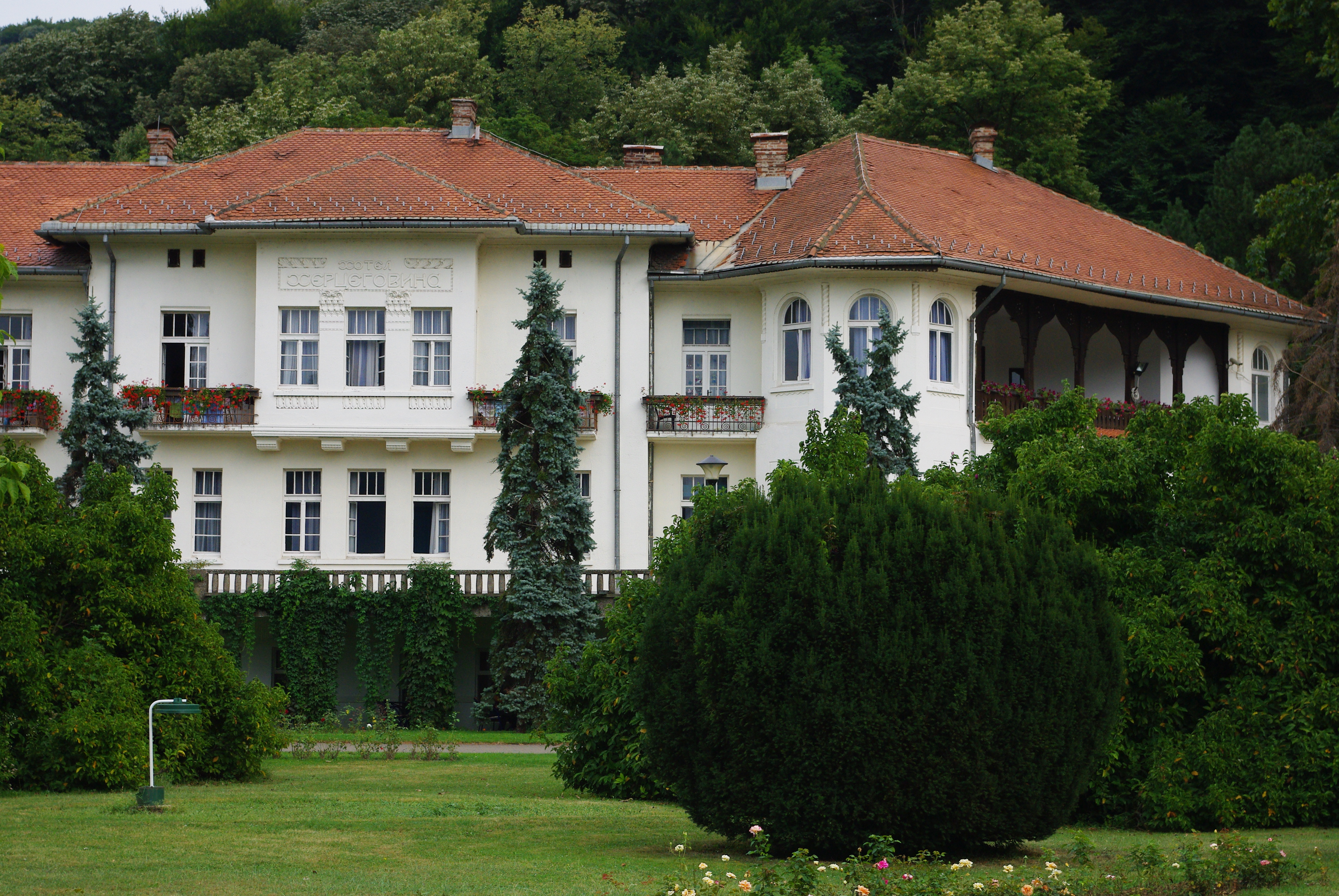
Hotel Herzegovina

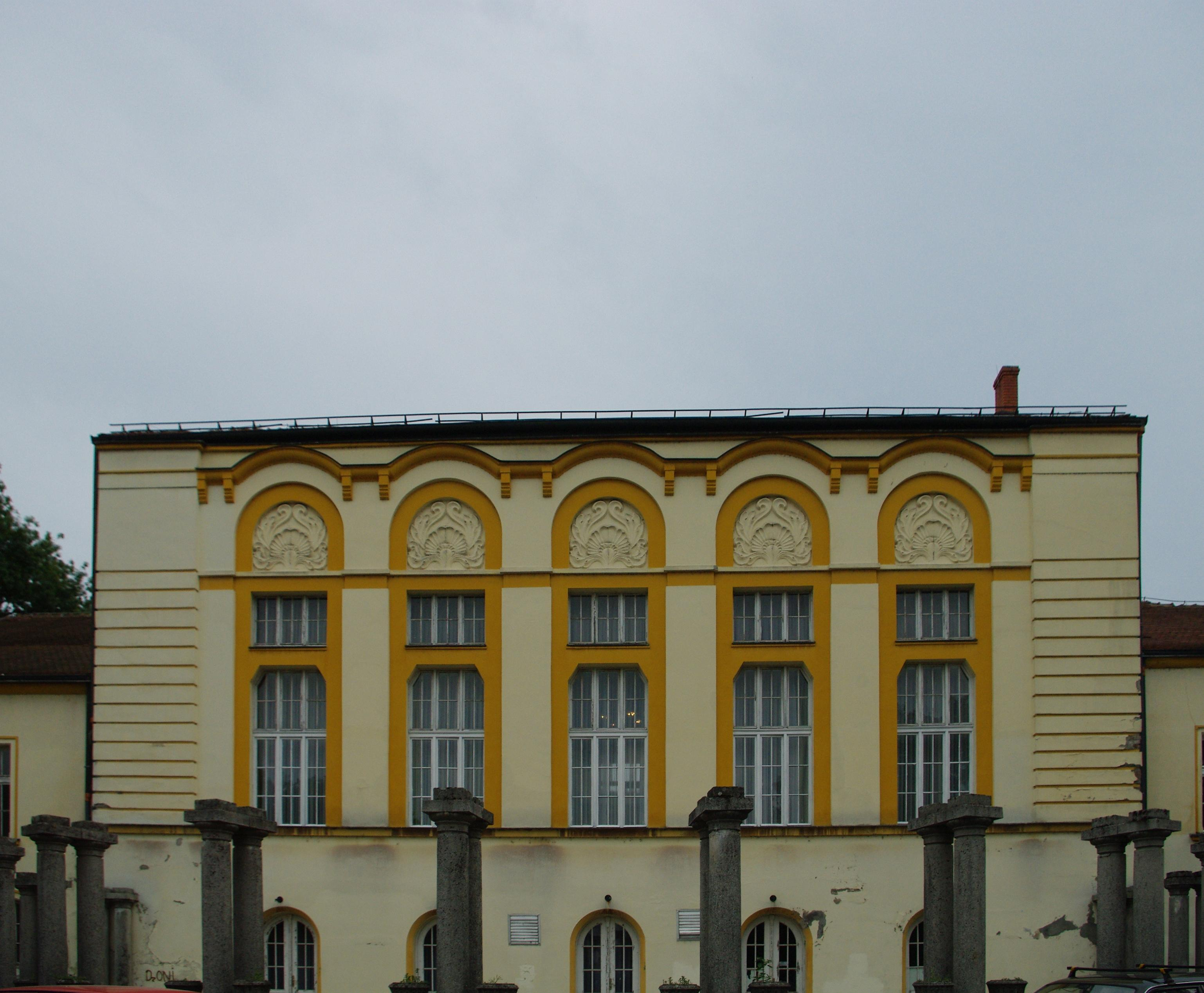
Kur-salon

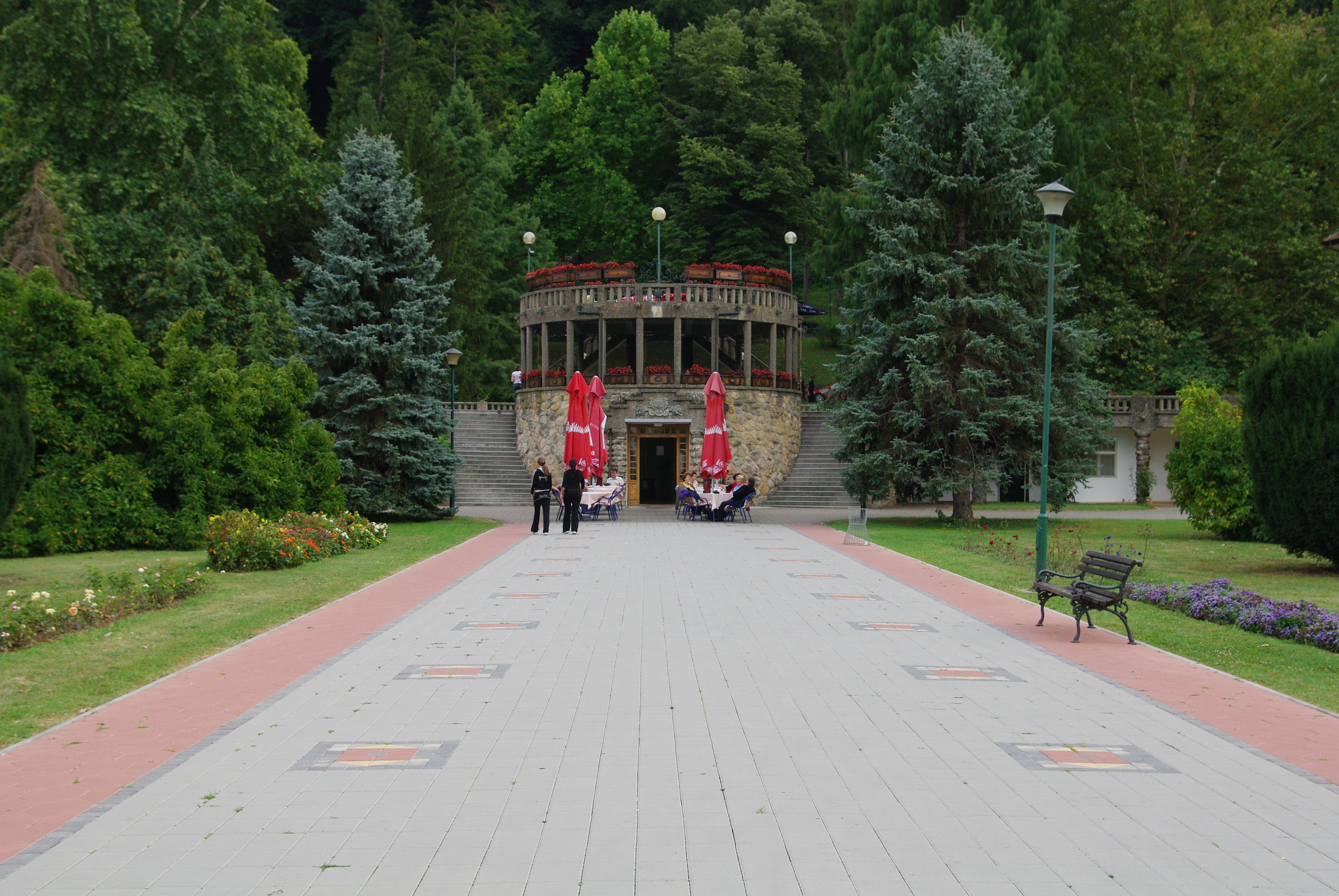
Citadel

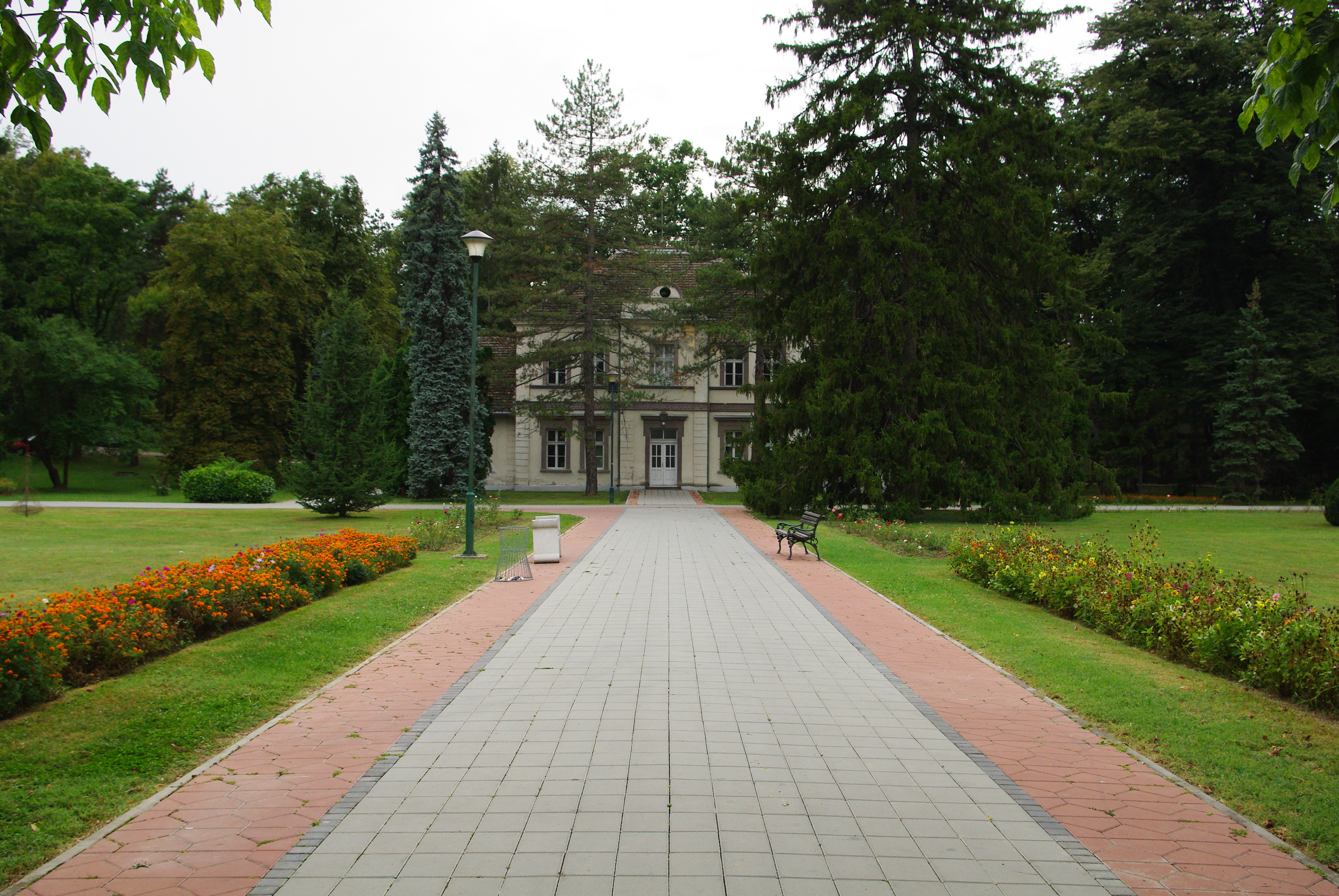
One of the many abandoned villas

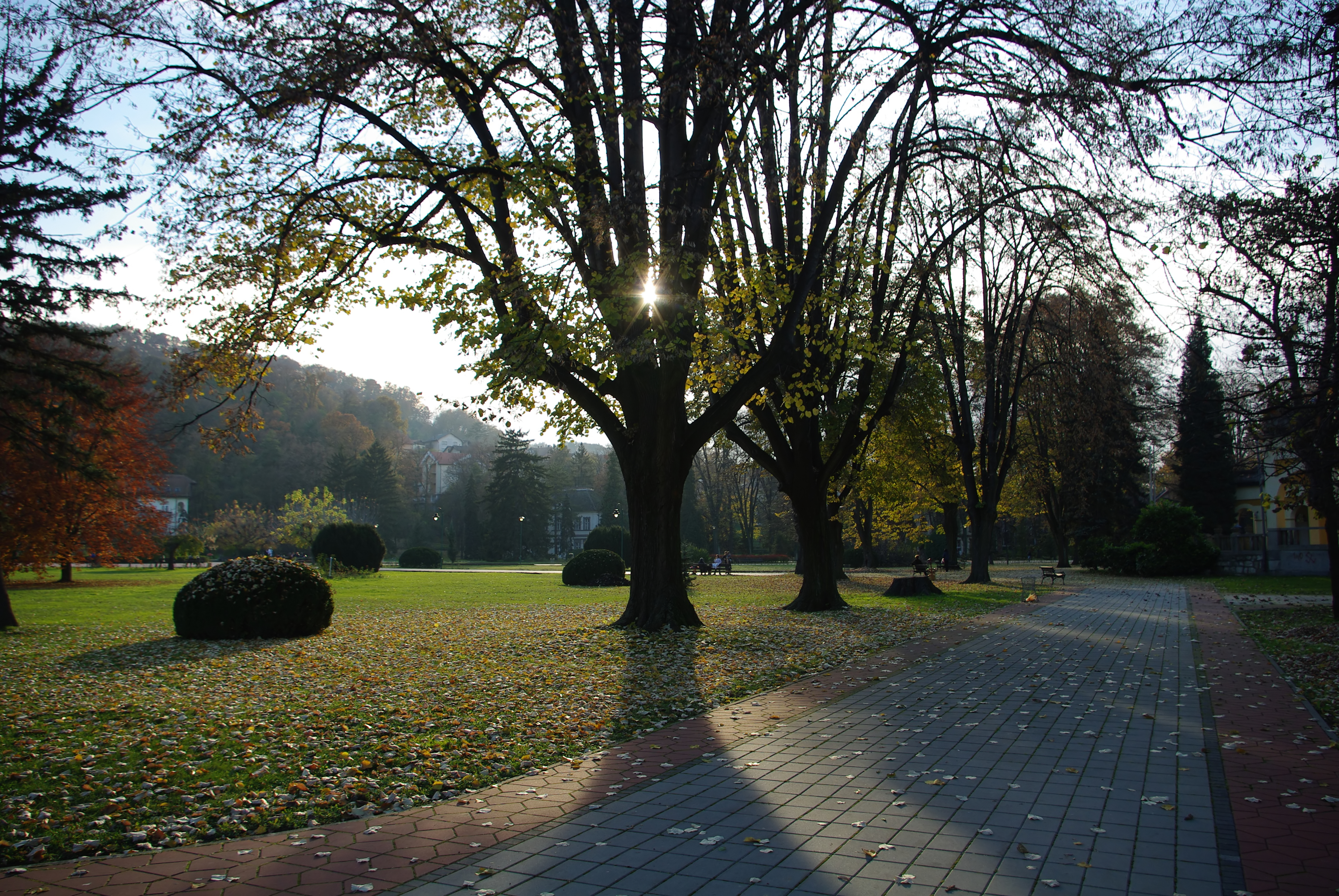
Tree at Banja Koviljaca

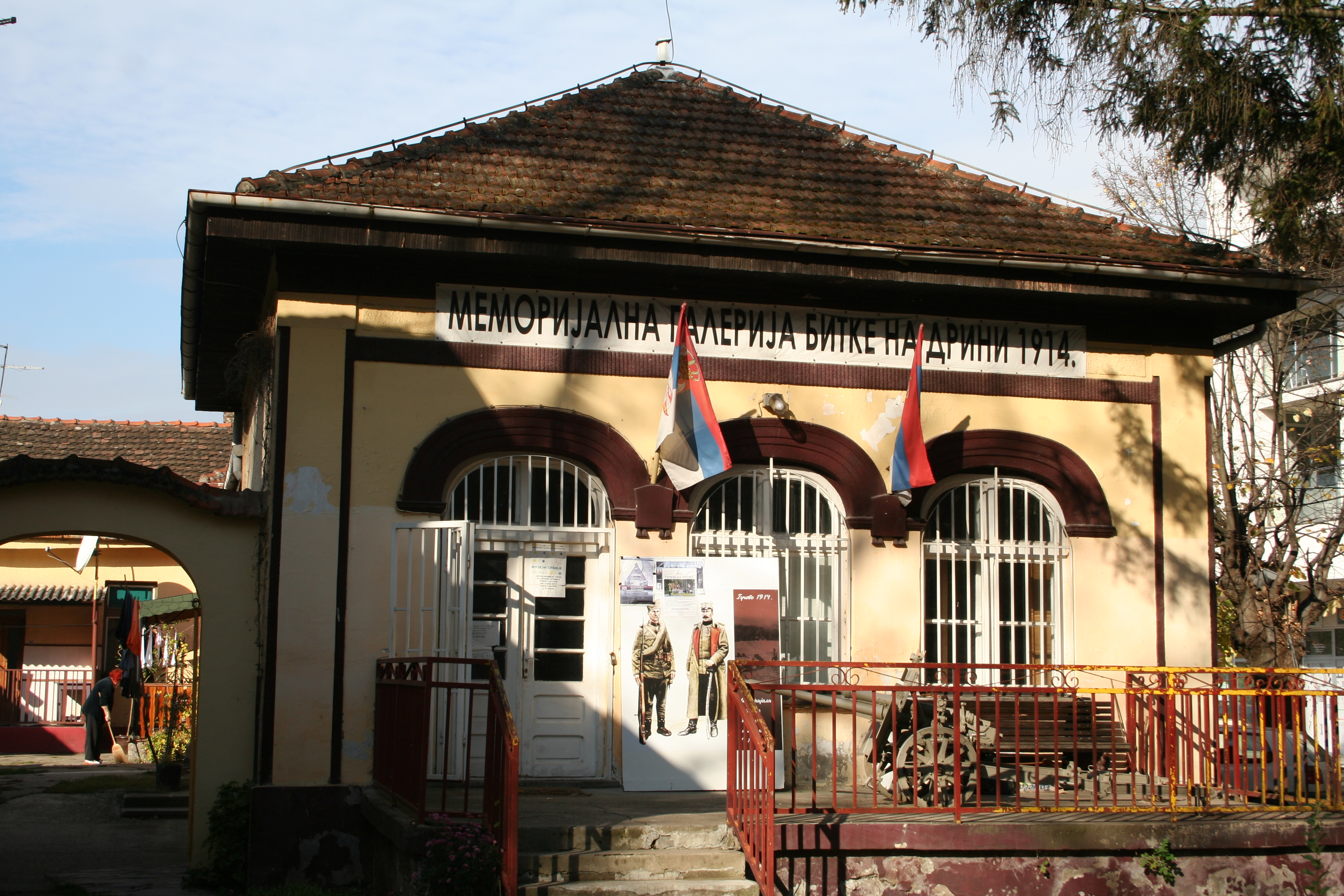
Memorial Gallery of the Battle of the Drina (1914)

== See also ==
- List of spa towns in Serbia
- List of places in Serbia
