= Zavlaka =

Coordinates: 44°21′10.08″N 19°23′20.04″E

- Village (Selo)
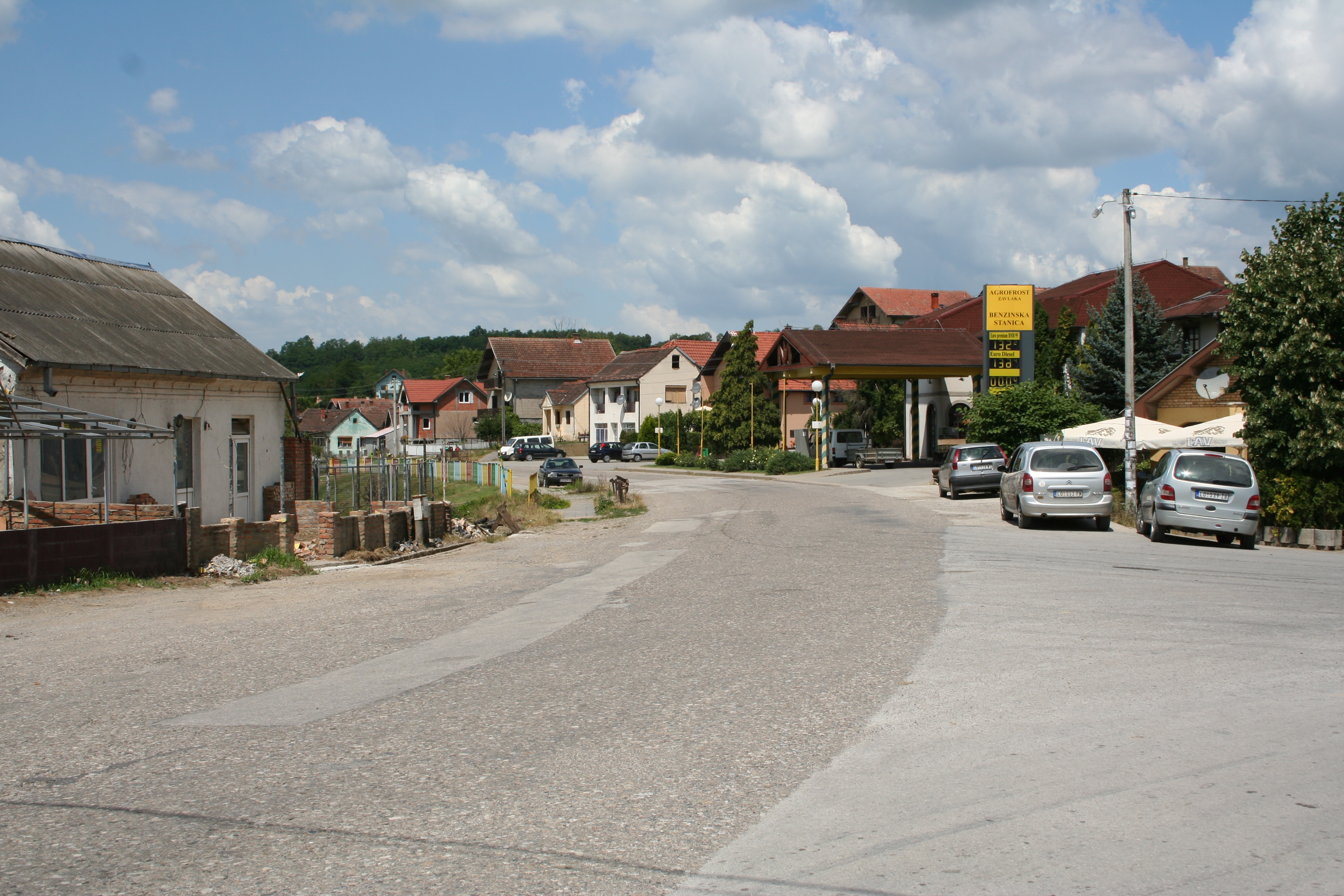
- Interactive map of Zavlaka
- Country: Serbia
- Municipality: Krupanj
- Time zone: UTC+1 (CET)
  - Summer (DST): UTC+2 (CEST)

Zavlaka (Serbian Cyrillic: Завлака) is a village in Serbia. It is situated in the Krupanj municipality, in the Mačva District of Central Serbia. The village had a Serb ethnic majority and a population of 962 in 2002.

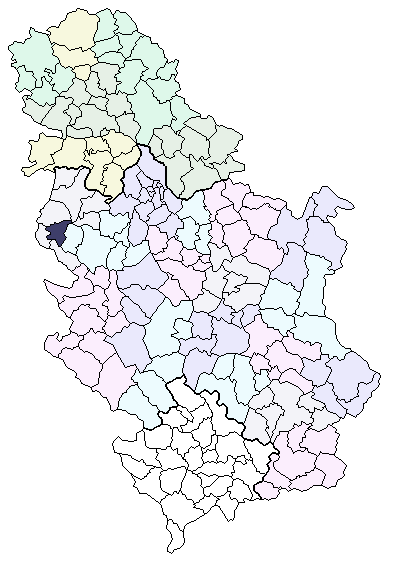
Location of the Krupanj municipality in Serbia

== Historical population ==
- 1948: 1,487
- 1953: 1,547
- 1961: 1,410
- 1971: 1,176
- 1981: 1,039
- 1991: 991
- 2002: 962

== See also ==
- List of places in Serbia
