= Lipolist =

Lipolist Липолист (Serbian)
- Village (Selo)
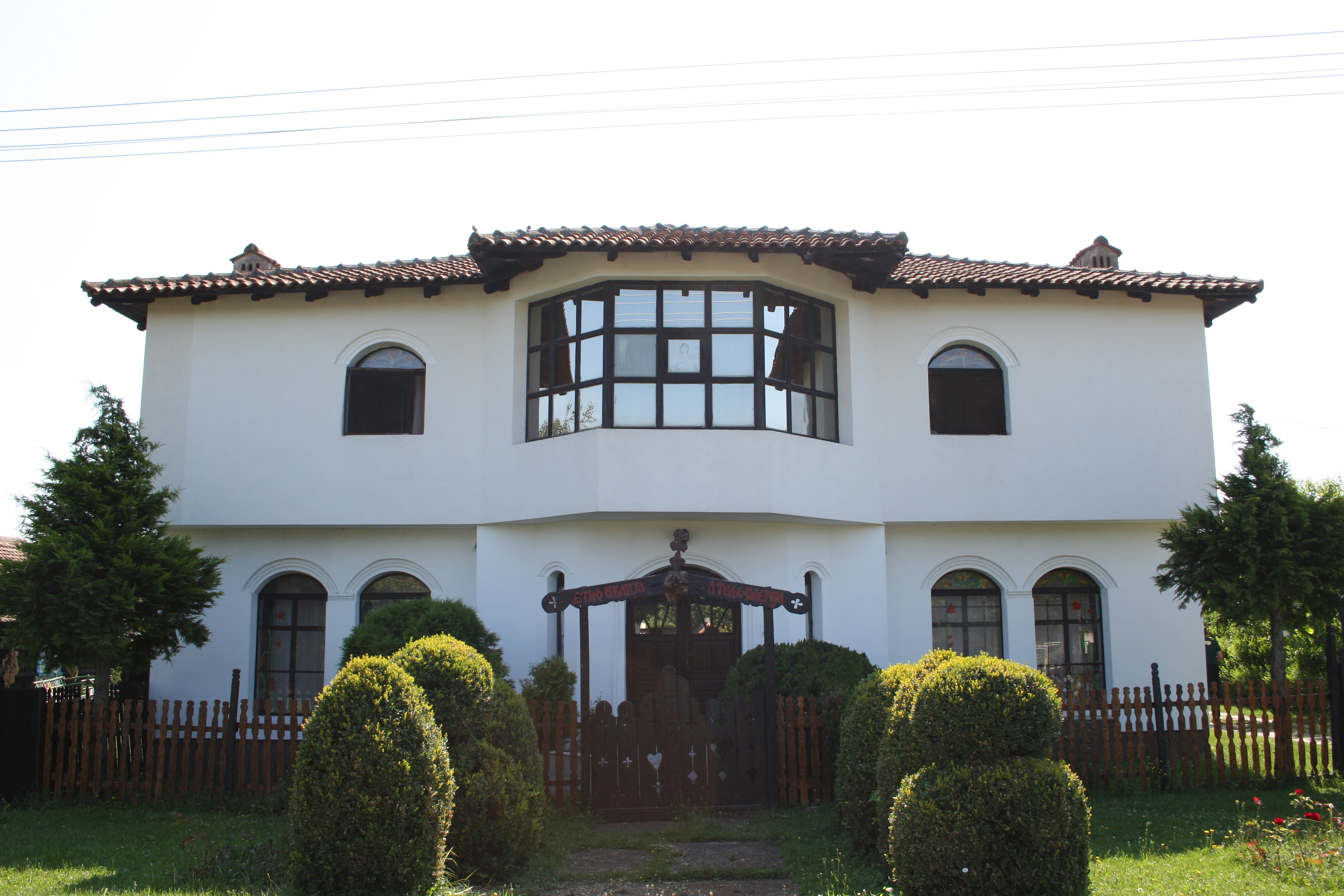

- Location within Serbia
- Coordinates: 44°42′N 19°30′E
- Country: Serbia
- Time zone: UTC+1 (CET)
  - Summer (DST): UTC+2 (CEST)

Lipolist (Serbian Cyrillic: Липолист) is a village in Serbia. It is situated in the Šabac municipality, in the Mačva District. The village has a Serb ethnic majority and its population numbering 2,582 people (2002 census).

== Geography ==
Lipolist is situated on the border between the lowland Mačva region and the hilly slopes of the Cer mountain. The name of the village means "linden tree leaf". In the early 2020s, it was estimated there are over 1,000 linden trees in the village or its surroundings.

== Characteristics ==
The village has a church dedicated to the Dormition of the Mother of God. Built in 1872, the church was declared a cultural monument and is protected by the state.

Lipolist has an elementary school "Stepa Stepanović", named after the field marshal Stepa Stepanović, one of the commanders in the World War I Battle of Cer. The battle occurred close to the village in August 1914, and Stepanović set his headquarters in Lipolist.

== Economy ==
Since 1985, an annual festival Ruže Lipolista ("Roses of Lipolist") has been held. The flower festival dedicated to roses also includes poetry evenings and other cultural events. Lipolist is known in Europe for the production of the rose seedlings. Around 1,000,000 seedlings are produced yearly in village's nursery gardens, of which 800,000 are exported mainly to Russia, Poland and Germany. Lipolist is the largest rose seedling producer in Serbia.

The commercial seedling production began in 1931. As of 2019, a dozen of families had nurseries which employed 1,000 workers. The largest plantations have up to 6,500 plants. The best known variety was the "Maršalka" ("Marshall rose"), grown in France, and named after Yugoslav president Marshal Josip Broz Tito. The flower was white with red edges, and was the bestselling rose variety in Serbia in the late 1970s and early 1980s. In the 2010s, the most grown cultivars were the purple ones. The breeders have been trying for decades to breed black roses, but the dark red color was the closest they achieved.

== See also ==
- List of places in Serbia
- Mačva
