= Gučevo =

Mountain in Serbia

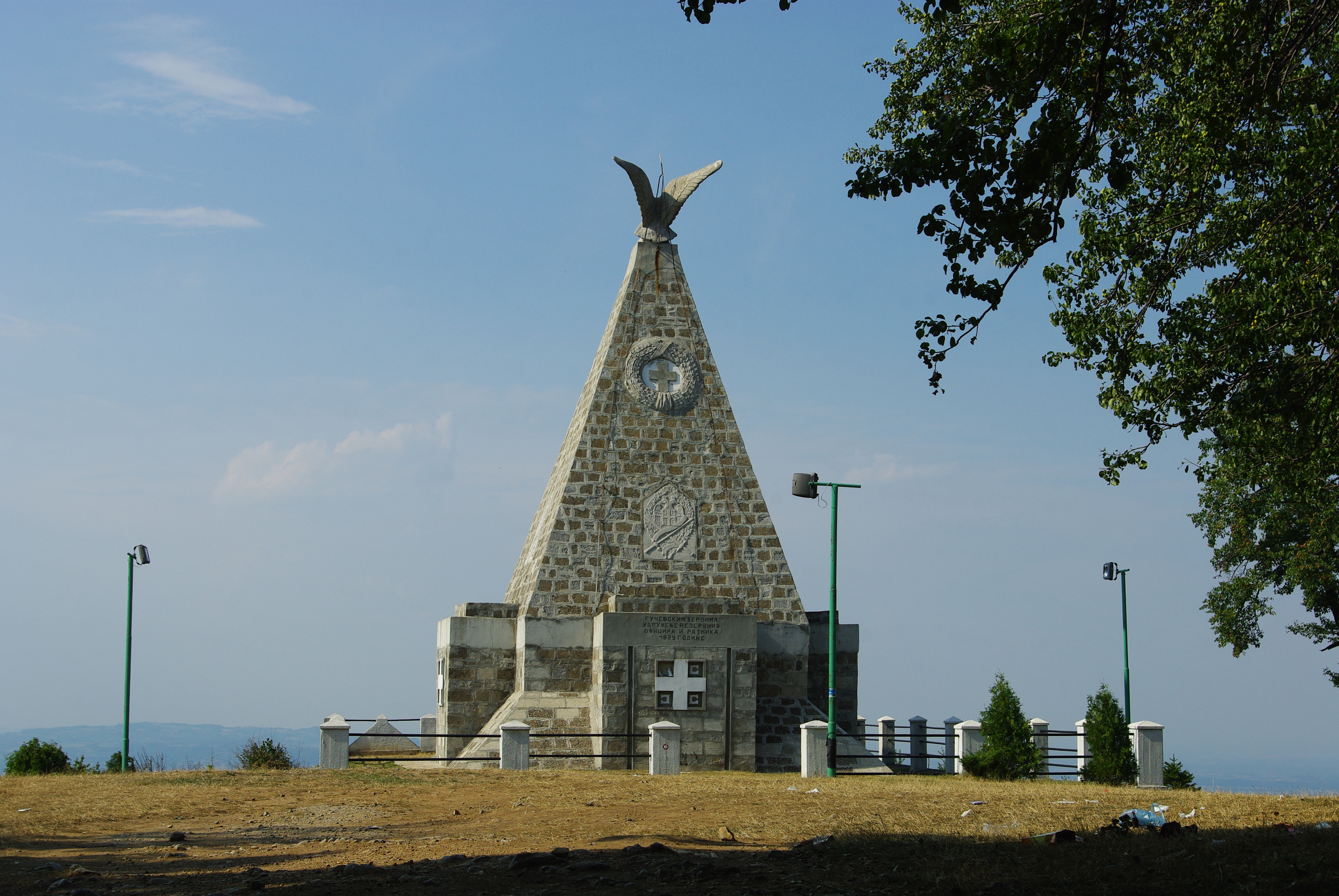
- Monument on Crni vrh

Highest point
- Elevation: 779 m (2,556 ft)
- Coordinates: 44°28′50″N 19°11′04″E

Geography
- Location within Serbia
- Location: Western Serbia
- Parent range: Dinaric Alps

Gučevo (Serbian Cyrillic: Гучево, pronounced [ɡûːtʃeʋo]) is a mountain in western Serbia, near the town of Loznica, overlooking the Drina river. Its highest peak, Crni vrh, has an elevation of 779 meters above sea level.

The mountain was a site of Battle of Gučevo between Serbian and Austro-Hungarian army in World War I. At the top of the mountain there is a monument to Serbian and Austro-Hungarian soldiers.

== See also ==
- List of mountains in Serbia
