= Battle of Loznica (1941) =

Battle between Serbian Chetniks and Germans in Serbia

- Part of the Uprising in Serbia during World War II in Yugoslavia
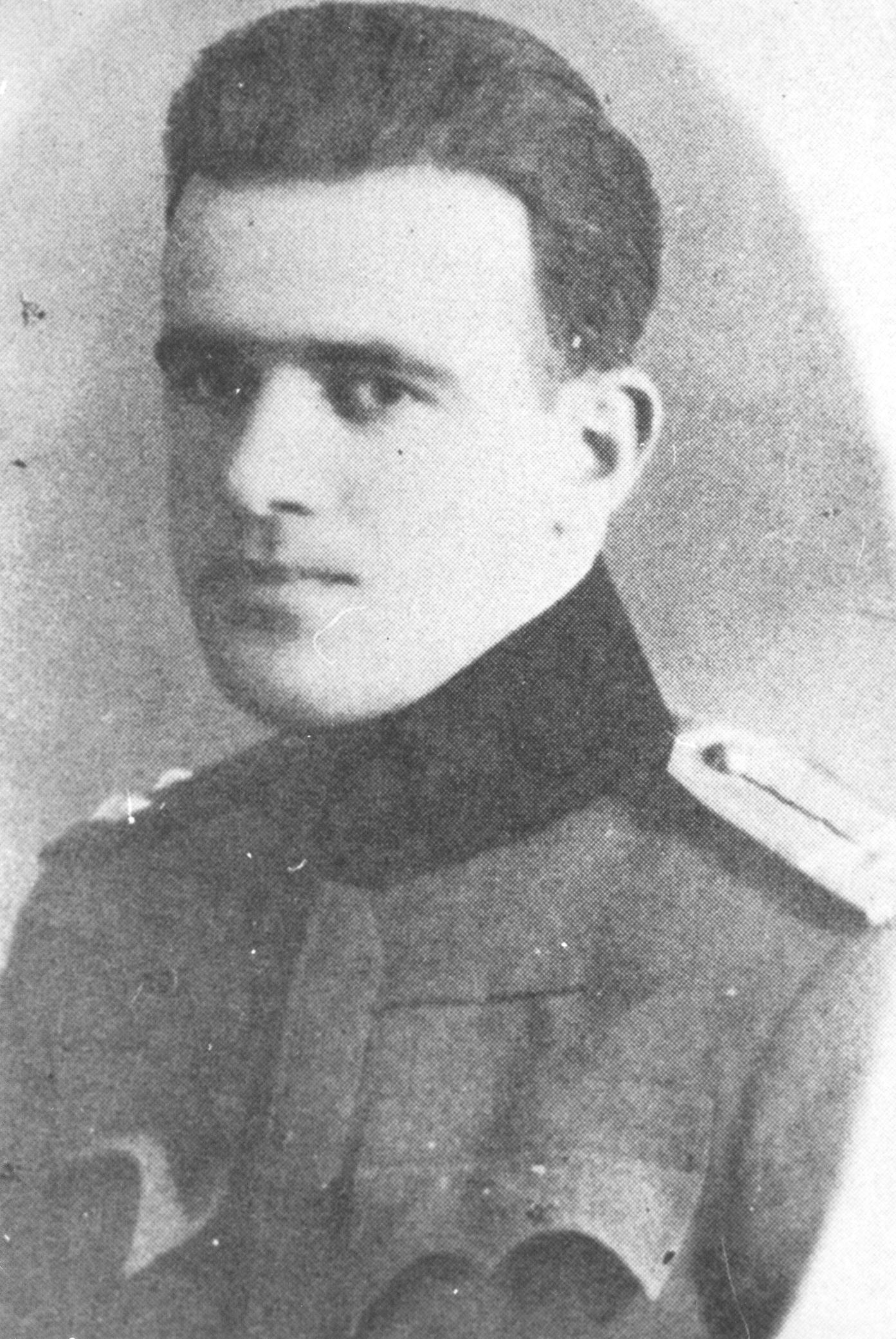
- Lieutenant Colonel Veselin Misita was killed leading his Chetniks in the attack on the German garrison
| Date | 31 August 1941 |
| Location | Loznica, German-occupied territory of Serbia |
| Result | Chetnik victory: First liberated town by a domestic resistance in occupied Europe |

Belligerents
| Chetniks | Germany (Government of National Salvation) Serb Gendarmes |

Commanders and leaders
| (Chetniks) Veselin Misita † (Chetniks) Georgije Bojić (Chetniks) Bogdan Drljača | Von der Olenz |

Units involved
| Jadar Chetnik Detachment | Elements of the 750th Infantry Regiment; 100~ Serbian Gendarmerie |

Casualties and losses
| 18 killed 4 wounded | Several killed and wounded 93 captured |

The Battle of Loznica involved an attack on the German garrison of that town by the Jadar Chetnik Detachment on 31 August 1941. Following the World War II German-led Axis invasion of Yugoslavia in April 1941, the Kingdom of Yugoslavia was partitioned. At the time, Loznica was part of the German-occupied territory of Serbia, which included Serbia proper, with the addition of the northern part of Kosovo (around Kosovska Mitrovica), and the Banat.

The Chetniks attacked, led by Lieutenant Colonel Veselin Misita, who was killed during the assault. The Germans surrendered and 93 were captured. This battle was closely followed by the joint Partisan-Chetnik attack on the German garrison at Banja Koviljača.

== Background ==
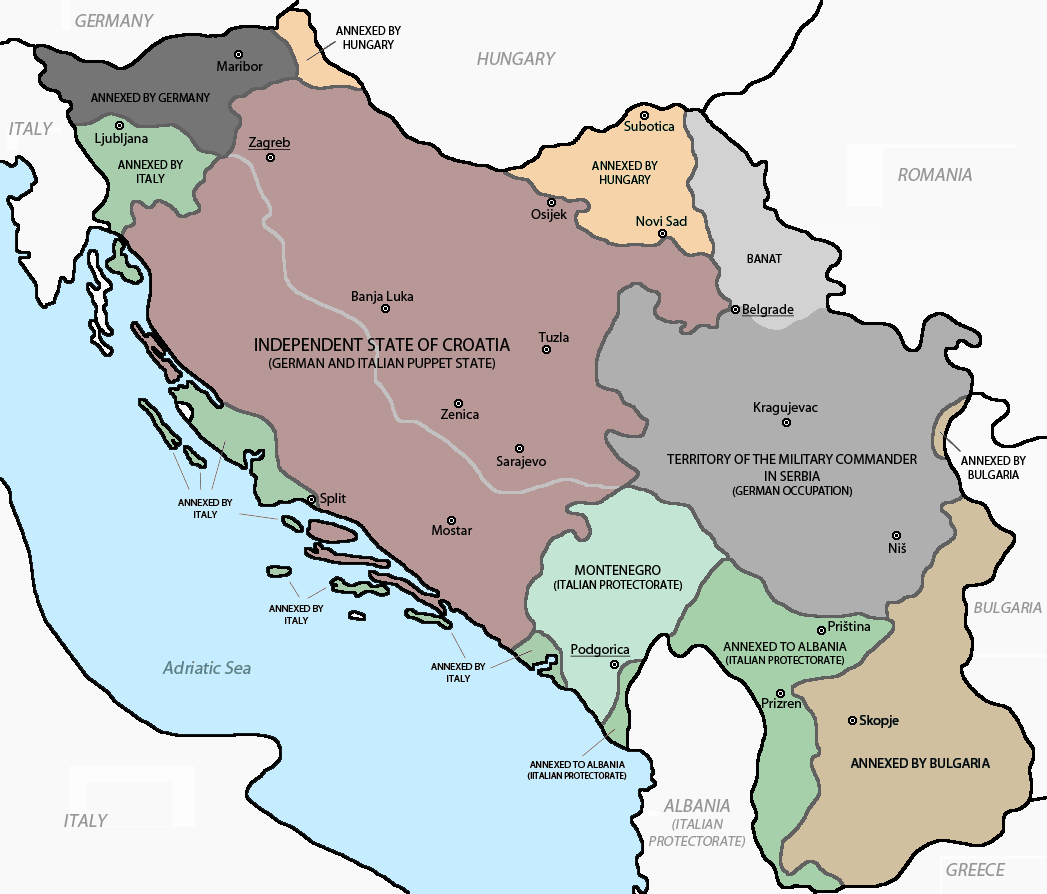
The occupation and partition of Yugoslavia, 1941–43. The dark and light grey areas on the eastern border show the extent of the German-occupied territory of Serbia.

In April 1941, Germany and its allies invaded and occupied the Kingdom of Yugoslavia, which was then partitioned. Some Yugoslav territory was annexed by its Axis neighbours, Hungary, Bulgaria and Italy. The Germans engineered and supported the creation of the puppet state, the Independent State of Croatia (Croatian: Nezavisna Država Hrvatska, NDH), which roughly comprised most of the pre-war Banovina Croatia, along with rest of present-day Bosnia and Herzegovina and some adjacent territory. The Italians, Hungarians and Bulgarians occupied other parts of Yugoslavian territory. Germany did not annex any Yugoslav territory, but occupied northern parts of present-day Slovenia and stationed occupation troops in the northern half of the NDH. The German-occupied part of Slovenia was divided into two areas that were placed under the administration of the Gauleiters of the neighbouring Reichsgau Kärnten and Reichsgau Steiermark.

The remaining territory, which consisted of Serbia proper, the northern part of Kosovo (around Kosovska Mitrovica), and the Banat was occupied by the Germans and placed under the administration of a German military government. This was due to the key rail and riverine transport routes that passed through it, and its valuable resources, particularly non-ferrous metals.

In May, German troops of the 750th Infantry Regiment of the 704th Infantry Division were stationed in the Mačva, Jadra and Pocerina (Cer) districts of the Podrinje region, garrisoning Šabac, Banja Koviljača and Loznica.

In early July, shortly after the launching of Operation Barbarossa against the Soviet Union, armed resistance began in the German-occupied territory of Serbia, against both the German Army and the representatives of the German-installed puppet government known as the Commissioner Government. This was a response to appeals from both Joseph Stalin and the Communist International for communist organisations across occupied Europe to draw German troops away from the Eastern Front, and followed a meeting of the Central Committee of the Yugoslav Communist Party in Belgrade on 4 July. This meeting resolved to shift to a general uprising, form Partisan detachments of fighters and commence armed resistance, and call for the populace to rise up against the occupiers throughout Yugoslavia. This also coincided with the departure of the last of the German invasion force that had remained to oversee the transition to occupation. From the appearance of posters and pamphlets urging the population to undertake sabotage, it rapidly turned to attempted and actual sabotage of German propaganda facilities and railway and telephone lines. The first fighting occurred at the village of Bela Crkva on 7 July, when gendarmes tried to disperse a public meeting, and two gendarmes were killed.

== Prelude ==
In the Podrinje region, encompassing the Drina basin, a Partisan district committee had been formed on 29 June, to oversee the local uprising and form Partisan detachments. After collecting weapons and ammunition, the detachment's first action was to attack the gendarmerie station in Bogatić on 7 August, disarming the gendarmes and capturing more weapons. Due to the scope of the local uprising, on 9 August the detachment was renamed the Podrinje Partisan Detachment. They disarmed the re-equipped gendarme platoon at Bogatić on 10 August, and then carried out the destruction of town archives, telephone lines and bridges in the district. By 14 August, the detachment's ranks had swelled to about 360 fighters in six companies, the occupation forces and local collaborators were finding it difficult to use the road from the district centre Šabac to Loznica due to Partisan ambushes, and the railway line between the two towns was out of action.

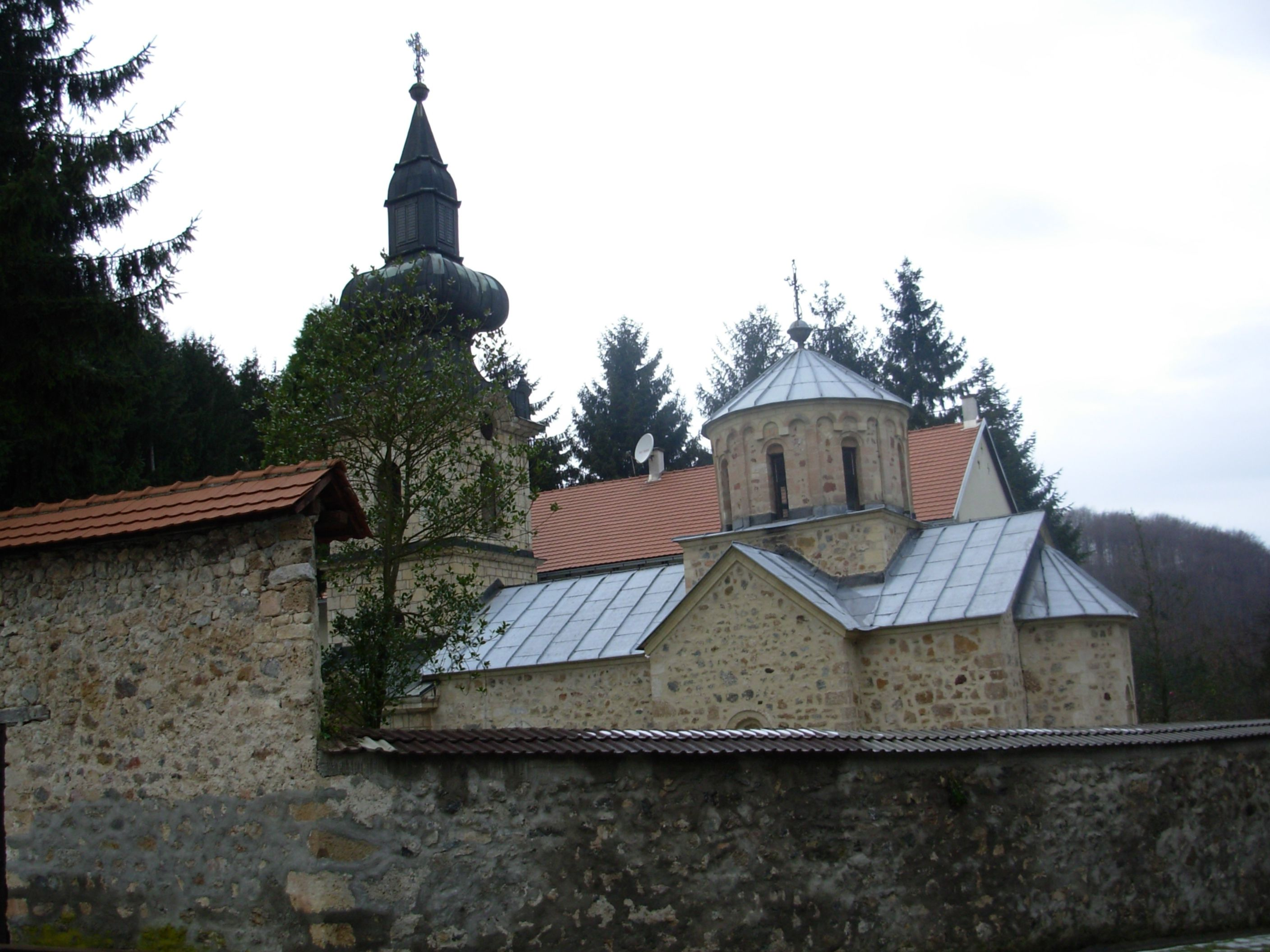
The Tronoša Monastery, where Misita established his headquarters

The first royalist Chetnik units were mobilised by order of Draža Mihailović in August 1941. In late July, Mihailović had sent a regular officer, Lieutenant Colonel Veselin Misita to the Jadar district as his emissary. Misita had established himself at the Tronoša Monastery near Loznica. The abbot of the monastery was Georgije Bojić, who was also a captain in the Royal Yugoslav Army reserves. In August, Misita and Bojić held a meeting with pro-Chetnik people from the Jadar district to set up the Jadar Chetnik Detachment. Other key attendees included Nikola Gordić and Mika Komarčević. On 15 August, the 25-strong Cer Chetnik Detachment was formed under the command of a regular artillery officer, Captain First Class Dragoslav Račić. Due to Mihailović's position that the Chetniks should prepare for an uprising, but not engage in fighting the occupiers until the time was right, some Chetniks left the Jadar detachment and joined the more aggressive Račić or the Partisans.

Račić signed a mutual cooperation agreement against the occupation forces with the commander of the Podrinje Partisans, Nebojša Jerković. Due to its lack of action against the Germans and puppet government, the Jadar Chetnik Detachment became quite isolated. Their leadership realised that the Partisans were getting stronger with each success against the occupiers, and the Chetnik position was becoming relatively weaker due to their inaction. Misita's decision to attack Loznica was a consequence of the cooperation agreement Račić signed with the Partisans.

== Battle ==
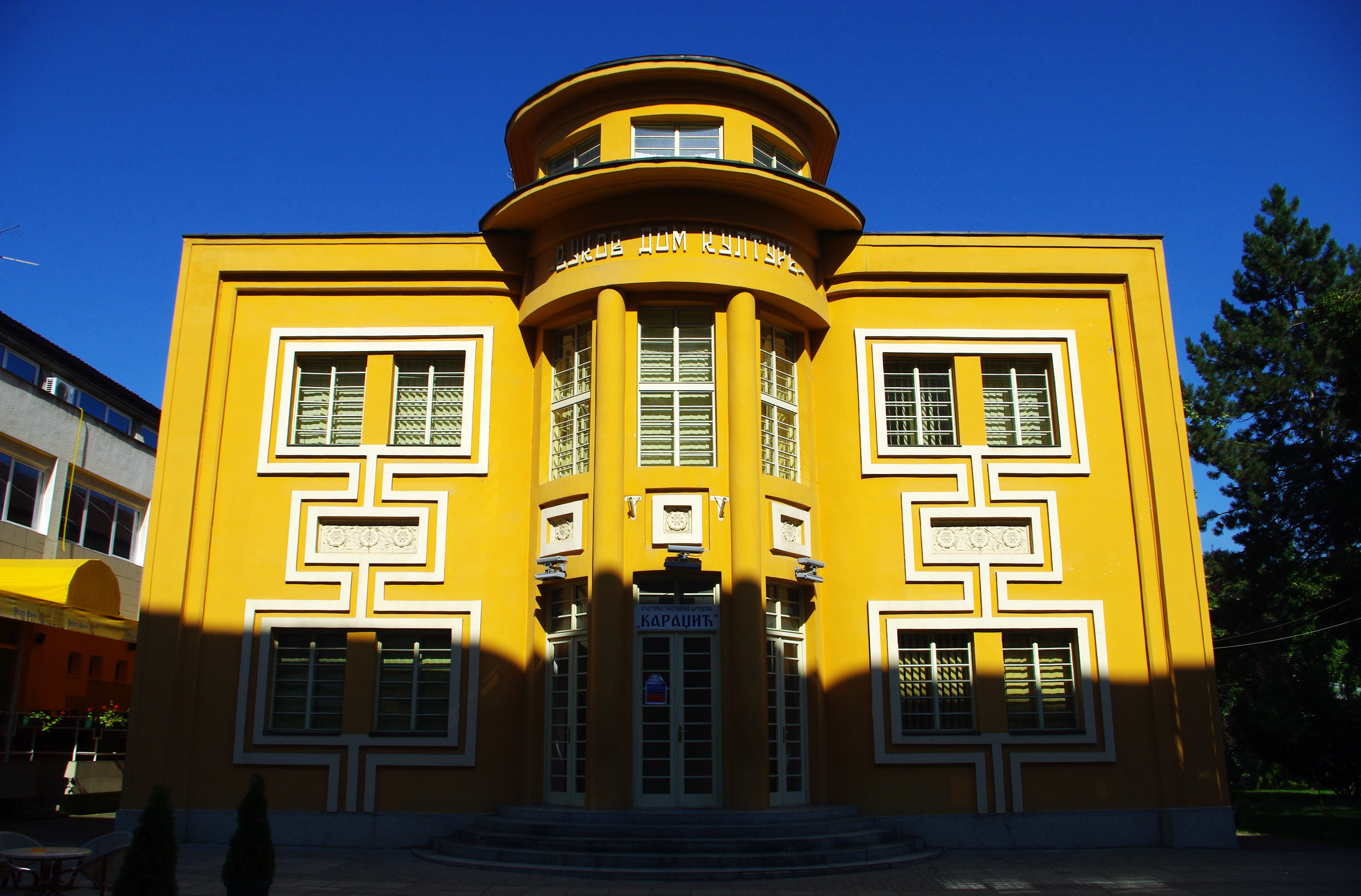
One of the German strongpoints had been established in the Vuk Karadžić Cultural Centre

At the time of the attack on Loznica, the Jadar Chetnik Detachment consisted of a large number of poorly organised peasants, drawn mainly from the villages around the town. The Germans had established strongpoints in the gymnasium, Vuk Karadžić Cultural Centre, and the "Laze Hajduković" cafe. The attack commenced at 07:00, with Misita in the vanguard. He was killed at the head of his troops while throwing hand grenades at German positions. Many of the Germans surrendered in the face of the Chetnik assault. During the battle, Misita's Chetniks suffered 18 killed and four wounded, while the Germans incurred several killed and wounded and 93 captured. The remaining Germans fled in the direction of Banja Koviljača. The wounded Germans were taken to hospital, and the rest of the captured troops were escorted to the monastery, and treated humanely.

At the same time as the Jadar Chetniks were attacking Loznica, Račić's Cer detachment attacked the village of Bogatić in accordance with the Chetnik-Partisan agreement. The gendarmes had been reinforced by the 6th Company of the German 750th Infantry Regiment with artillery support. On the second day of the attack, the garrison was reinforced by the 7th Company of the 750th Infantry Regiment arriving from Sremska Mitrovica, and an additional platoon sent from Šabac. After two days fighting, Račić's Chetniks withdrew to Cer mountain with considerable losses, after which they marched to Loznica to join the Jadar Chetniks.

== Aftermath and legacy ==
Following its capture, the Chetniks established a command post in the town and mobilised the populace. Supporters of the Partisans formed a local unit and directed workers into the fields and a nearby mine. The Partisans also set up a workshop in the town to manufacture hand grenades. After their failed attack on Bogatić, the two Chetnik detachments decided to attack Banja Koviljača. Launched on 1 September, this attack was initially unsuccessful. After being reinforced by the Podrinje Partisans, the town was captured in the early hours of 6 September. In the meantime, other elements of the Podrinje Partisan Detachment had expelled the German garrison and collaborationist gendarmes from Bogatić on 3 September. On 6 October 1941, Loznica was re-occupied during the German Mačva operation.

Josip Broz Tito's biographer Vladimir Dedijer described Misita's death as a great loss for the uprising. On 31 August 2008, the deputy speaker of the Serbian National Assembly, Božidar Delić of the Serbian Radical Party, dedicated a plaque to Misita in the Vuk Karadžić Square in Loznica. One of the people present was the man that had applied for the plaque to be installed, Božidar Panić, who had idolised Misita in his youth, and had lit a candle for him every year.
