= Bela Crkva incident =

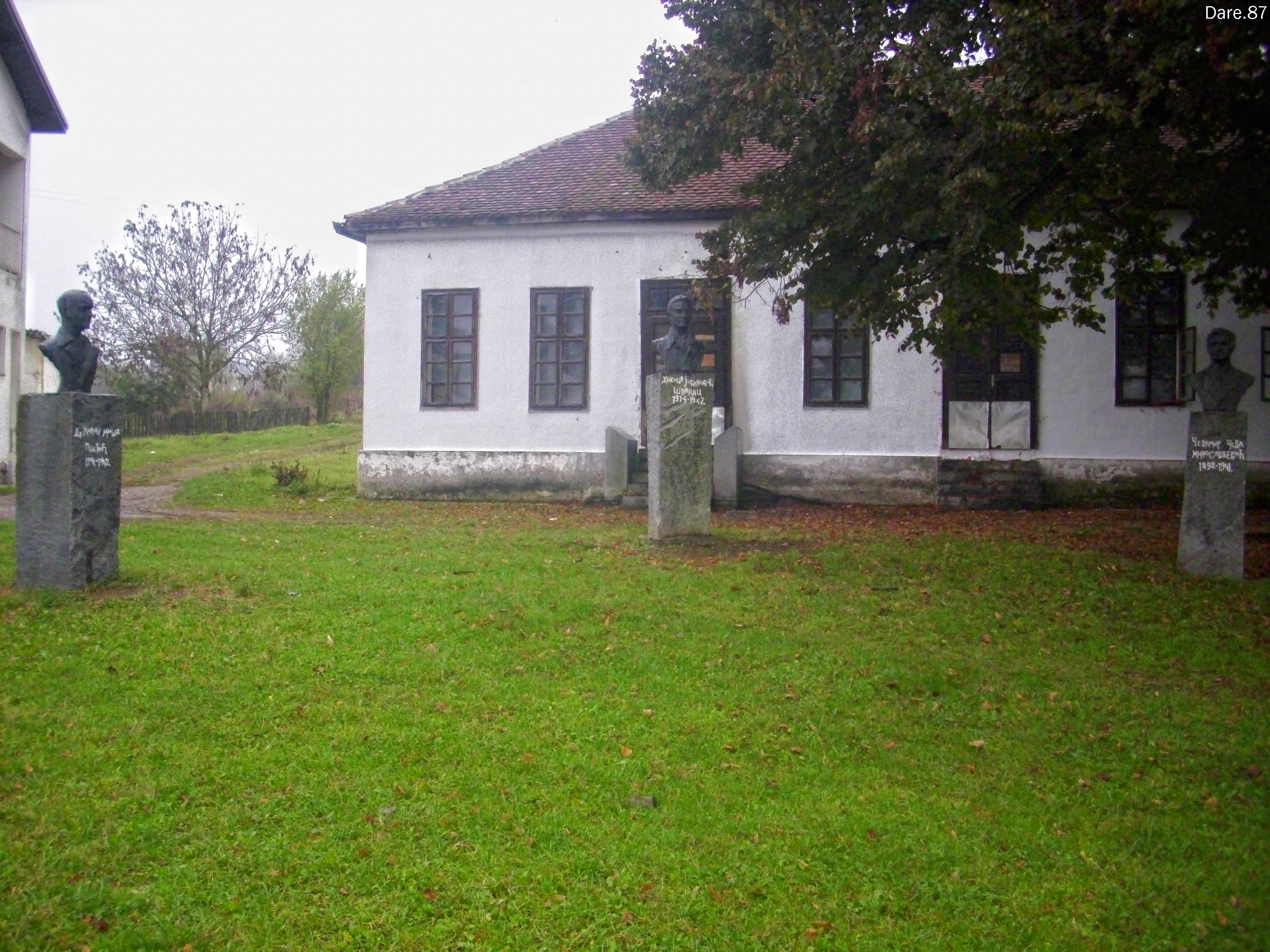
The former tavern in Bela Crkva in front of which the Partisans killed two gendarmes. Busts of Miša Pantić, Žikica Jovanović Španac and Čeda Milosavljević can be seen in the foreground.

The Bela Crkva incident was an event that took place on 7 July 1941 in the village of Bela Crkva near Krupanj, when a group of Yugoslav Partisans led by Žikica Jovanović Španac killed two gendarmes who were enforcing a ban on political rallies after the German occupation of Serbia. The event was later taken as the beginning of the uprising in Serbia led by the Communist Party of Yugoslavia against the Axis occupiers and their collaborators.

== Background ==
After quickly being overrun by Germany and its allies in the April 1941 invasion of Yugoslavia, the country was dismembered. Serbia proper was organized in the occupation zone called the Territory of the Military Commander in Serbia. The Germans also set up Milan Aćimović's puppet Commissar Government and kept the pre-war gendarmerie in order to maintain order. The Germans also banned all political activities in their occupation zone.

Outlawed in the interwar period, the Communist Party of Yugoslavia (CPY) began its preparations for an uprising as soon as the Royal Yugoslav Army capitulated. The German invasion of the Soviet Union sped up the CPY's activities. Germans and their collaborators also began arresting men who were suspected of being communists. The Politburo of the CPY Central Committee decided at its meeting held in Belgrade on 4 July 1941 (attended by Josip Broz Tito, Aleksandar Ranković, Milovan Đilas, Ivan Milutinović, Ivo Lola Ribar, Svetozar Vukmanović, and Sreten Žujović) that the time had come for armed resistance. The next day, the occupation authorities began killing hostages, as the gendarmes shot 13 hostages (ten communists and three Jews).

Western Serbia and Šumadija were the regions where the first partisan detachments were formed. Among them was the Valjevo detachment with the Rađevina company. The political commissar was journalist and teacher Žikica Jovanović Španac, a veteran of the Spanish Civil War. Among others in the Rađevina company were physician Miša Pantić and teacher Čeda Milosavljević.

== The incident ==
Sunday, 7 July, was the day of the traditional village fair on Saint John's Day (according to the Julian calendar). Vladan Bojanić, a law student, spread rumours that a political rally would take place later that day. Village chief Sredoje Knežević attempted in vain to disperse the people gathered there.

The group of 15 armed partisans entered Bela Crkva from the nearby forest around 4:00 p.m. and headed toward the tavern to give a speech. The rally was started by village resident Bogoljub Rakić, a shoemaker and soldier of the Rađevica company. Following him, Miša Pantić, Čeda Milosavljević and Žikica Jovanović addressed the gathered people from the steps of the tavern that was located there. They spoke about the shameful capitulation, about the occupation of the country and the regime of terror and exploitation, about domestic traitors who help the occupiers, about the Soviet Union and the strength of the Red Army. Reminding the audience of the fighting traditions of the area, such as Cer, Mačkov kamen and Gučevo, they invited them to join the partisan ranks. Different sources and testimonies claim that the peasants responded positively to speeches, and several young men decided to join them. After receiving new fighters, the partisans headed in the direction of the forest where they came from. Bojanić remained in Bela Crkva.

Shortly after the departure of the partisans, a gendarmerie patrol from the nearby village Zavlaka arrived in the village, which in the meantime was informed about the arrival of "armed communists". Sergeant Bogdan Lončar and Corporal Milenko Braković were on patrol, and they began to ask about the identity of the partisans and disperse the gathered people to their homes. Bojanić then went after the partisans and told them about the arrival of the gendarmes, so Jovanović made the decision to return and disarm them. Approaching the place where the speech was held, they saw the crowd caused by the gendarmes. The partisans then took cover, and Jovanović continued across the clearing towards the gendarmes and the crowd. He was followed by three partisans. When he approached them about fifteen meters away, one of those gathered shouted at the gendarmes that the Partisans had arrived, to which they turned and shouted at Jovanović to surrender; he replied that they were handing over their weapons. One of the gendarmes then shot at Jovanović but did not hit him, to which he responded almost simultaneously with shots from his Steyr M1912 pistol. Lončar was immediately fatally shot and fell to the ground, while the other was shot, but he also soon fell hit. At the same time, one of the partisans from Jovanović's entourage shot at the gendarmes. All sources agree that Jovanović killed Lončar, but it is unclear who exactly killed Braković.

After the shooting, Jovanović approached the killed gendarmes and took their rifles. These rifles were given to the new fighters who joined the company that day. To the gathered peasants, who were surprised by the speed of events and the unexpected turn of the situation, Jovanović said, "This is how all those who will serve the occupier will pass." After the action, Bojanić joined the company, as he could no longer stay in the village.

The events in Bela Crkva quickly resonated in Rađevina and the entire Valjevo region. For days, there was talk about the appearance of partisans and their confrontation with the gendarmes. The people spun various stories, which were usually exaggerated, but the collaborationist press from Belgrade itself, writing about this event as the "beginning of communist riots in Serbia", spread the news about the appearance of partisans.

== Aftermath ==
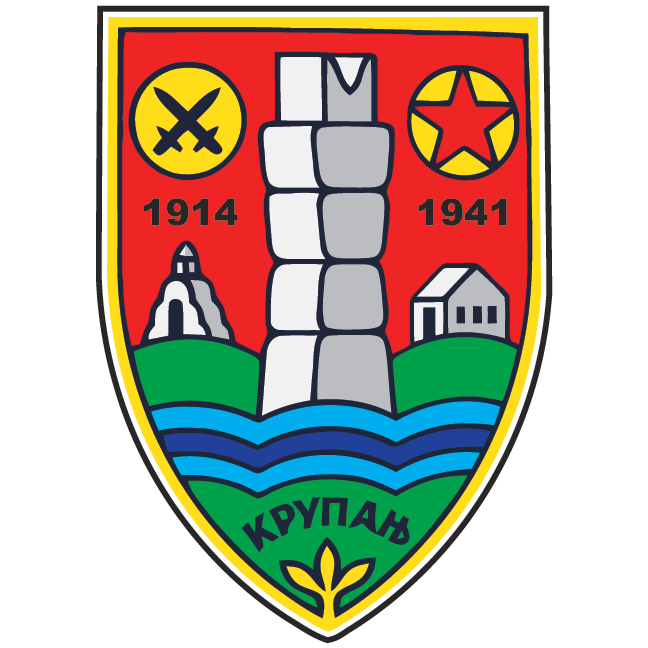
The year 1941 is featured on the coat of arms of the Krupanj municipality in reference to the event in Bela Crkva.

Immediately after the liberation of Yugoslavia, on 27 June 1945, the National Assembly of Serbia made a decision to declare 7 July a holiday – the Day of the Uprising of the People of Serbia. Živorad Jovanović Španac and Miša Pantić were also decorated with the Order of the People's Hero.

The holiday was celebrated until political changes in Serbia after the downfall of Slobodan Milošević. On 9 July 2001, the new parliamentary majority led by Zoran Đinđić's Democratic Party and Vojislav Koštunica's Democratic Party of Serbia revoked the decision from 1945. In subsequent years, representatives of state institutions and anti-communist individuals from the ruling civic parties, as well as revisionist historians, with the parallel efforts of the Serbian Orthodox Church, tried to revise the historical event. In the early 2000s, the remains of Lončar and Braković were exhumed and re-buried in the church of St. George in Bela Crkva. They both were legally rehabilitated by a decision of Šabac district court in 2008.
