= Uprising in Serbia (1941) =

Uprising against German occupation forces

- Part of World War II in Yugoslavia
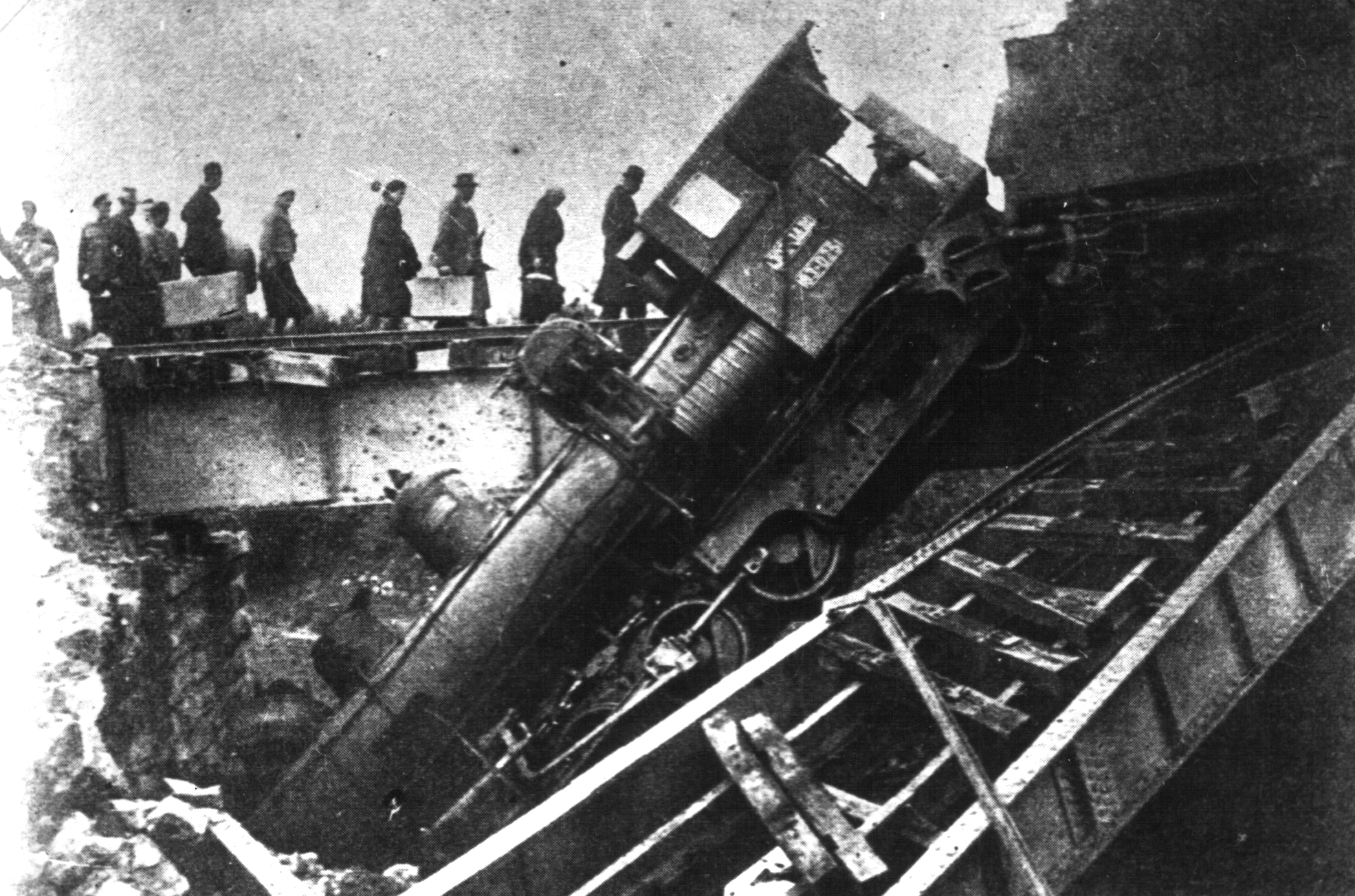
- Destroyed German train in Serbia, 1941
Date	7 July – 29 November 1941 (4 months, 3 weeks and 1 day)
Location	Western parts of Serbia
Result	German and Collaborationist victory: Uprising suppressed

Belligerents
(Yugoslav Partisans) Partisans; Chetniks (31 August–1 November)	Chetniks (from 1 November)	(Nazi Germany) Germany: Commissioner Government; Government of National Salvation (from 29 August); Pećanac Chetniks; Albania

Commanders and leaders
(Yugoslav Partisans) Josip Broz Tito (Yugoslav Partisans) Aleksandar Ranković (Yugoslav Partisans) Miloš Minić (Yugoslav Partisans) Koča Popović	(Chetniks) Draža Mihailović (Chetniks) Dragoslav Račić (Chetniks) Dragutin Keserović (Chetniks) Veselin Misita †	Heinrich Danckelmann; Franz Böhme; Paul Bader; Milan Nedić (Chetniks) Kosta Pećanac; Aćif Hadžiahmetović; Bilall Dreshaj; Shaban Polluzha

Casualties and losses
4,000 Chetniks & Partisans		200 killed 400 wounded
- 35,000 rebels and civilians massacred in reprisals

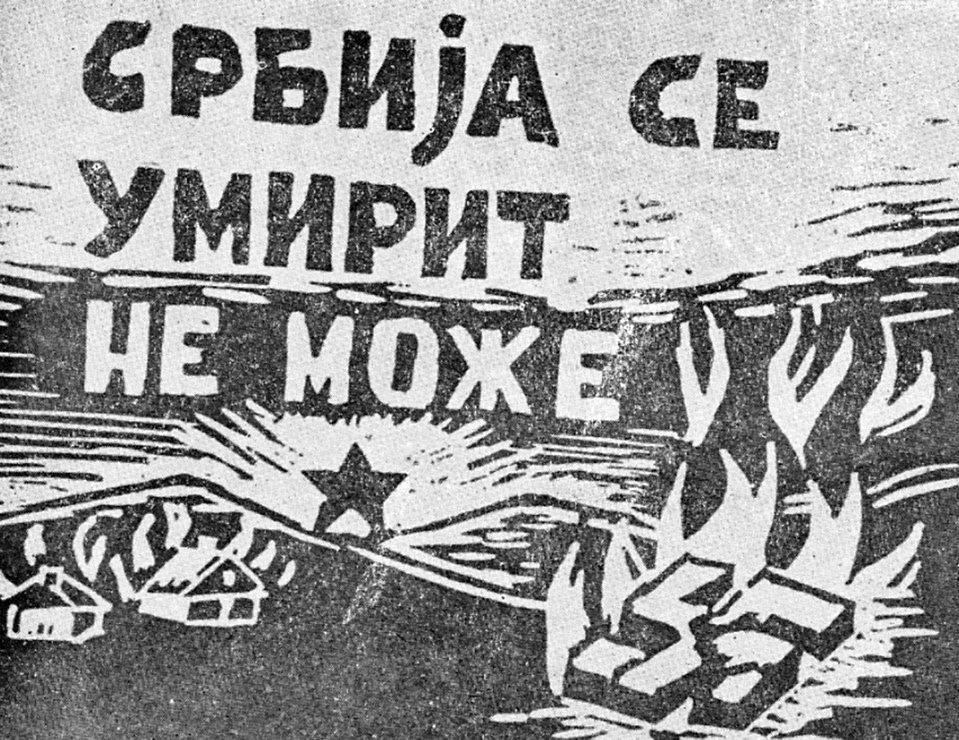
Poster of the Serbian Partisans, calling for an uprising

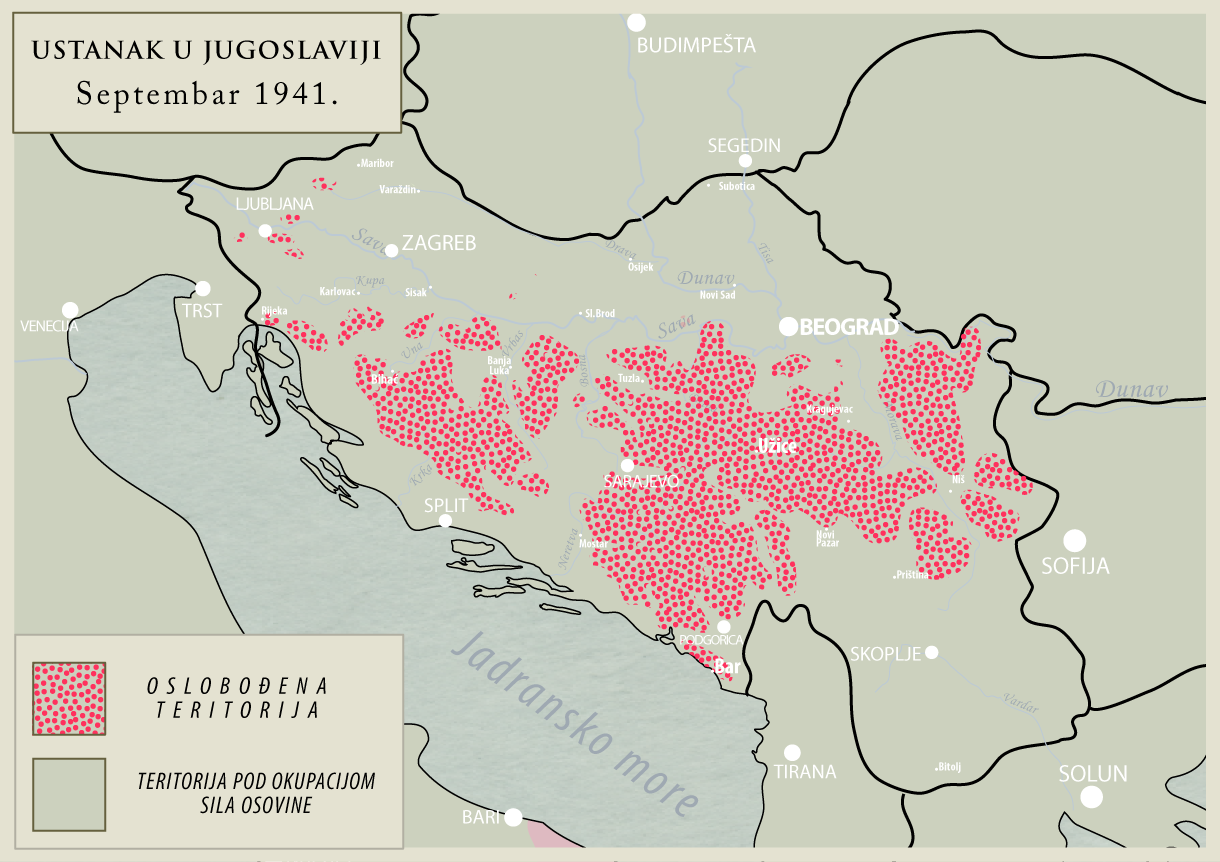
The uprising as of September 1941.

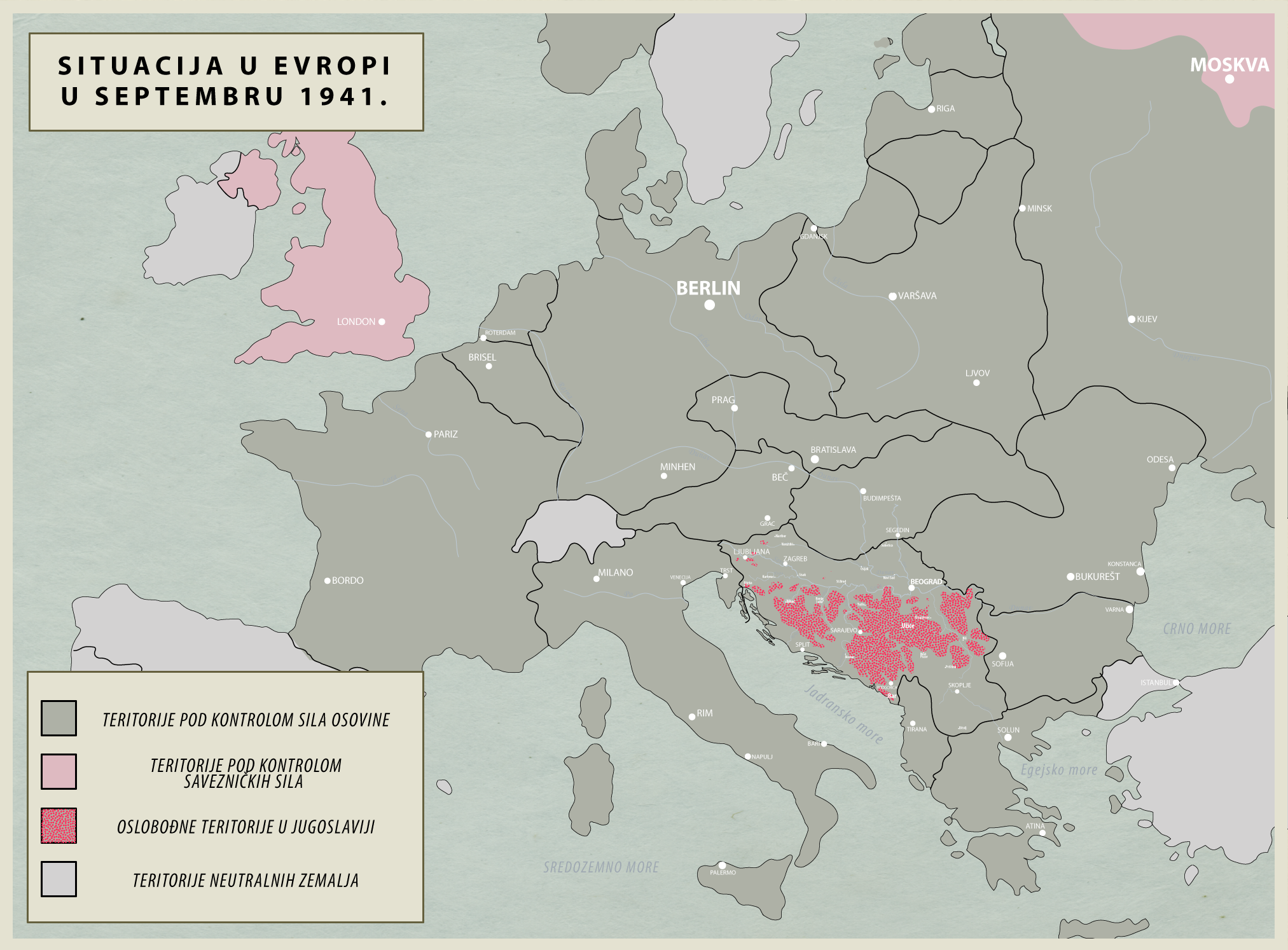
The Uprising in Yugoslavia and Europe 1941.

The Uprising in Serbia was initiated in July 1941 by the Communist Party of Yugoslavia against the German occupation forces and their Serbian quisling auxiliaries in the Territory of the Military Commander in Serbia. At first the Yugoslav Partisans mounted diversions and sabotage and attacked representatives of Milan Aćimović's quisling administration. In late August some Chetniks joined the uprising and liberated Loznica. The uprising soon reached mass proportions. Partisans and Chetniks captured towns that weak German garrisons had abandoned. The armed uprising soon engulfed great parts of the occupied territory. The largest liberated territory in occupied Europe was created by the Partisans in western Serbia, and was known as the Republic of Užice. Rebels shared power on the liberated territory; the center of the Partisan liberated territory was in Užice, and Chetniks had their headquarters in Ravna Gora.

As the uprising progressed, the ideological rift between the two factions became more and more obvious. On one side the Chetnik detachments considered themselves loyal to the royal government-in-exile and fought for the restoration of pre-war order. On the other side, Partisans favored the introduction of socialism and the post-war reorganization of Yugoslavia on a federal basis. The Chetnik leader Dragoljub Mihailović abandoned the uprising in late October and entered into negotiations with the quisling government and the Germans in order to destroy the rival Partisans.

The Germans soon gathered a large force and quelled the uprising using mass terror, but the remaining Partisan forces crossed into Bosnia, where they formed the 1st Proletarian Brigade. After the collapse of the uprising, the Territory of the Military Commander was largely pacified until the return of the Partisans and the Belgrade Offensive in the second half of 1944. Meanwhile, the Chetniks became even more reluctant to fight against the Germans, and engaged in anti-Partisan operations and open collaboration. Nevertheless, Mihailović was able to establish himself as the sole legitimate representative of the Yugoslav government-in-exile, and ordered that all resistance forces should fight under his command.

== Background ==
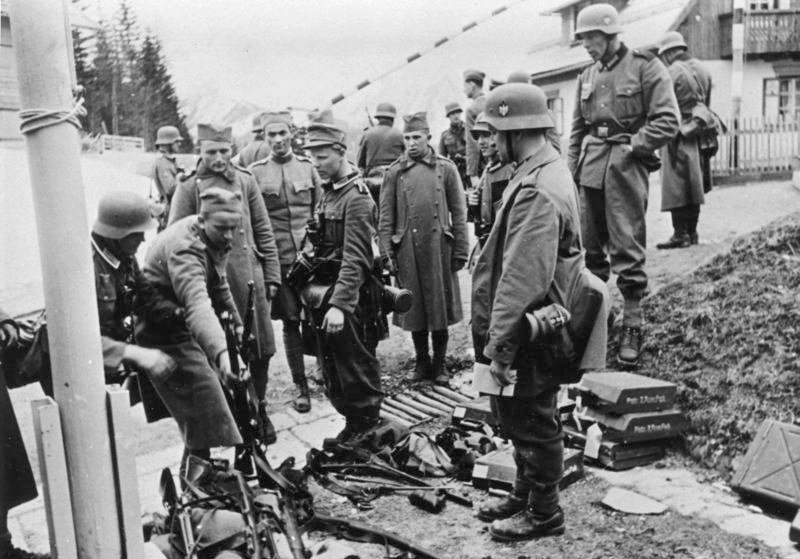
Yugoslav infantry surrendering to Germans

Hitler believed that with the occupation of Yugoslavia the country was liquidated as an independent state. The Kingdom of Yugoslavia was divided between Nazi Germany, Italy, Hungary and Bulgaria, while in the territory of present-day Croatia and Bosnia and Herzegovina, the Independent State of Croatia was proclaimed. Occupiers plundered possessions and took some 350,000 Yugoslav soldiers prisoner. The largest part of Serbia was organized into the Territory of the Military Commander in Serbia and as such it was the only example of a military regime in occupied Europe. The Germans chose Milan Aćimović as head of the quisling Commissary Government.

== Preparations for the uprising ==
=== Communists ===
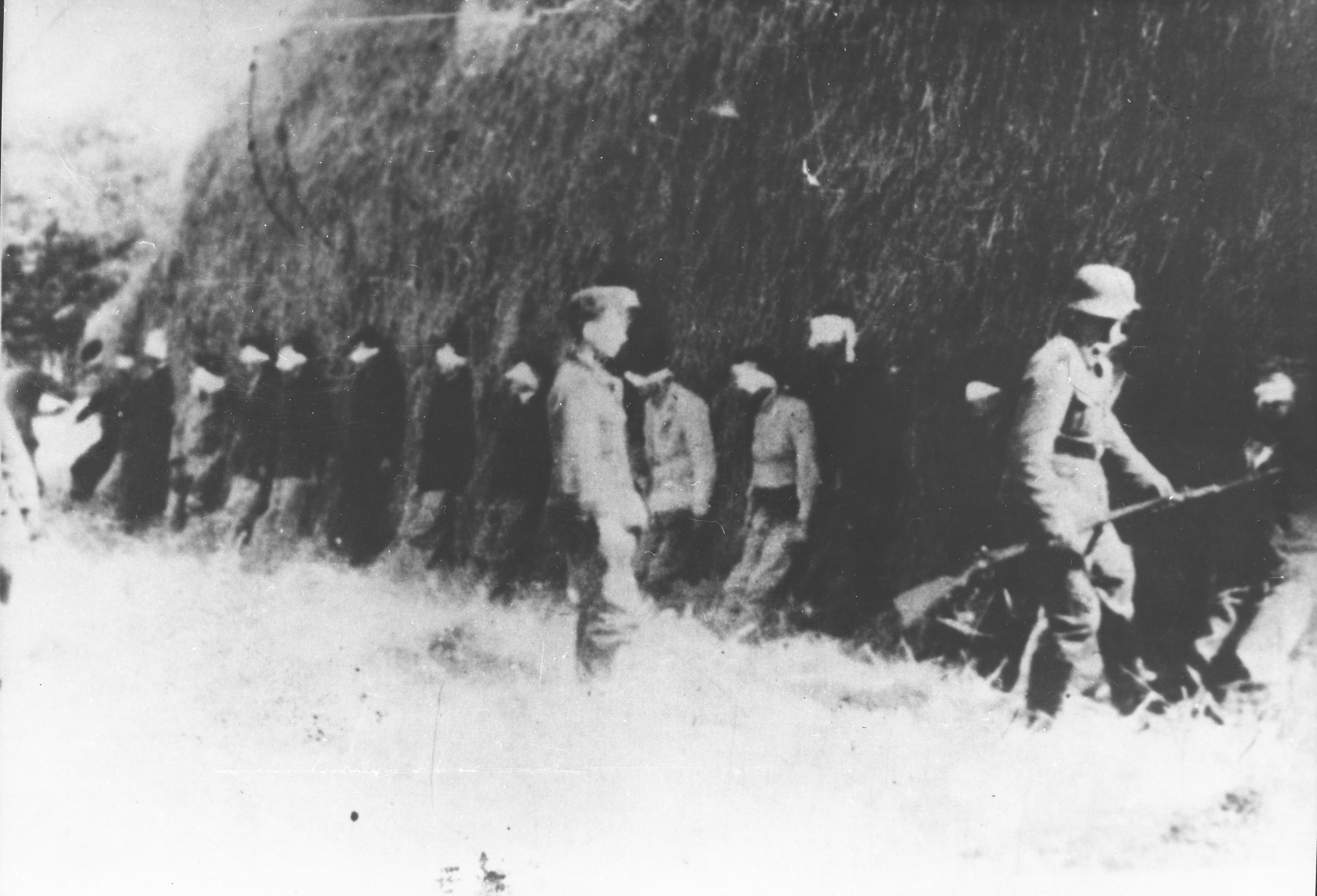
Sixteen blindfolded Partisan youth await execution by German forces in Smederevska Palanka, 20 August 1941

Preparations for the uprising by the Communist Party of Yugoslavia began after the May consultation held in Zagreb on 4 May 1941. The Military Committee of the Provincial Committee of the Communist Party for Serbia was formed in mid-May. On 13 May 1941, Josip Broz Tito sent a message to the Comintern stating that the Yugoslav communists were preparing for an uprising that would commence when Germany attacked the Soviet Union. The Central Committee of the Communist Party of Yugoslavia arrived in Belgrade in late May, and this was of great importance for the development of the resistance. After their arrival, the Central Committee held conferences with local party officials.

The German invasion of the Soviet Union, Operation Barbarossa, was launched on 22 June 1941. Before the invasion, the Germans withdrew the majority of their troops from Serbia, leaving three weak divisions in Serbia (the 704th, 714th and 717th Infantry Divisions) and one weak division (the 718th Infantry Division) in the Independent State of Croatia. The majority of these divisions were made up of older soldiers from Austria. Communist sympathisers in Srđan Budisavljević's Ministry of the Interior in Dušan Simović's government, such as Janko Janković, destroyed files on communists held in prewar police archives. So when mass arrests of communists began after the launch of Barbarossa, few records were available for the Gestapo to use. The communists then considered that all the requirements for the uprising were met.

The entrance of the USSR into the war strengthened the hope of the Serbian people, who traditionally saw Russia as protector of Serbia, as well as optimism that the war would be over soon. Dragomir Jovanović recorded that on 22 June the atmosphere in the streets was similar to the atmosphere of during the coup on 27 March. In Mačva peasants pulled out stakes from haystacks fearing that Soviet paratroopers would impale themselves by falling on them. In Belgrade, observers were posted on a tall building to report the arrival of Soviet aircraft. In Banat, medical groups were formed to help paratroopers.

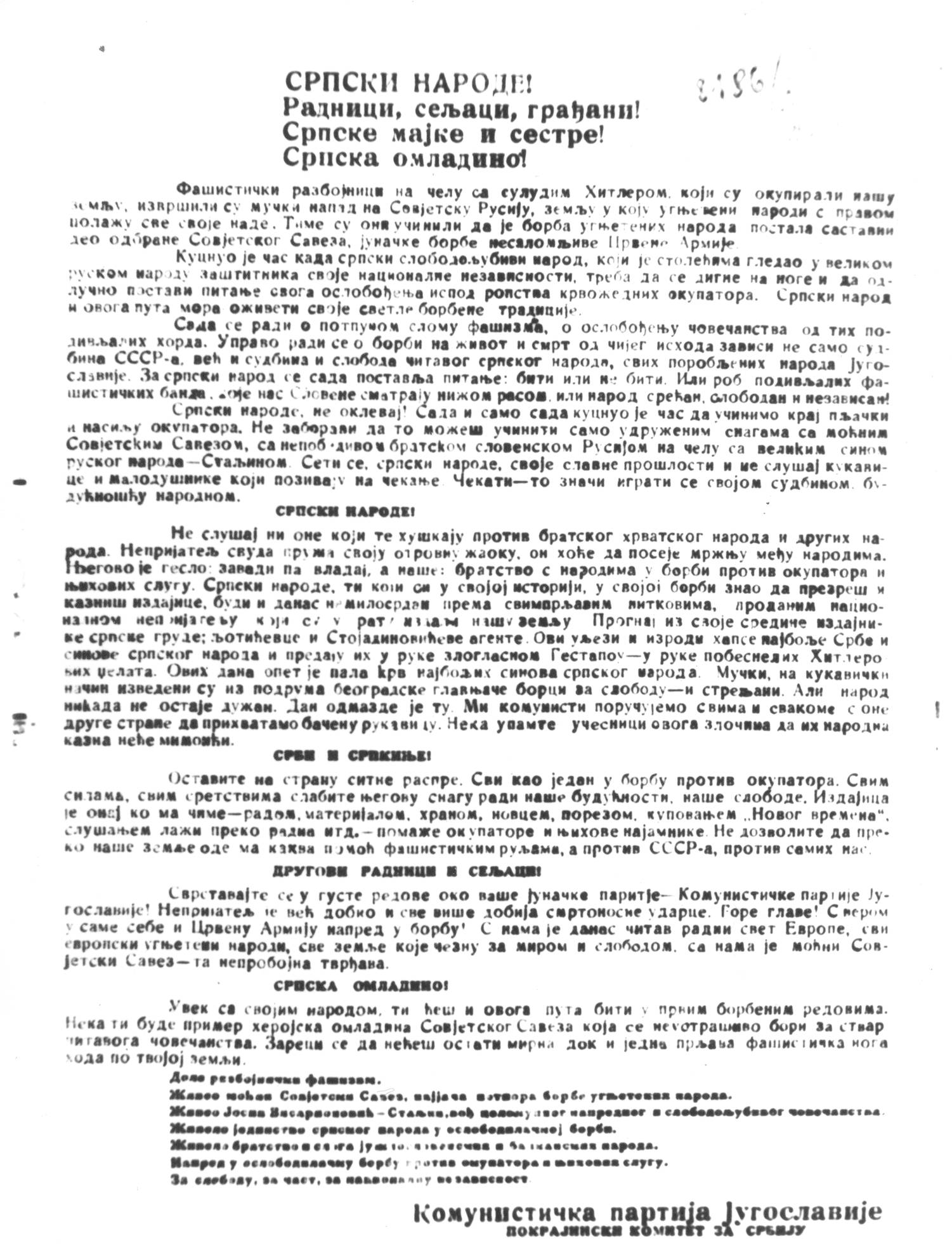
Proclamation of 5 July

Decisions for a struggle in Serbia were issued on June 23, 1941 at the meeting of the Provincial Committee for Serbia, which was attended by Aleksandar Ranković, Spasenija Babović, Đuro Strugar, Moma Marković, Ivo Lola Ribar, Blagoje Nešković, Vukica Mitrović, Mirko Tomić, Miloš Matijević, Ljubinka Milosavljević, Vasilije Buha and Milovan Đilas. At the meeting, party instructors for certain parts of Serbia were decided. For the upcoming struggle, the communists had to hasten the forming of armed groups and collecting weapons and medical supplies. After the meeting, instructors went to their designated areas. By the end of June, Moma Markovic held meetings with district committees in Jagodina, Niš and Zaječar, Mirko Tomić was in charge of Kruševac, Vasilije Buha went to Niš, Milan Mijalković went to Užice and Čačak, Miodrag Ivković to Šabac. Petar Stambolić operated in the Pomoravlje area and Miloš Minić in the Valjevo area. Several local detachments were formed numbering dozens of partisans. Significant amounts of weapons and ammunition were collected.

The Supreme Headquarters of the National Liberation Army of Yugoslavia was established on June 27. Josip Broz Tito was chosen as Supreme Commander. Other members were: Milovan Đilas, Edvard Kardelj, Ivan Milutinović, Aleksandar Ranković, Rade Končar, Franc Leskošek, Sreten Žujović, Ivo Lola Ribar and Svetozar Vukmanović. On July, in the home of Vladislav Ribnikar on Dedinje a session of the Central Committee was held. Present were Tito, Ranković, Milutinović, Đilas, Ribar, Vukmanović and Žujović. A decision was made to begin sabotage and small attacks on German and quisling forces. The Supreme Staff for Serbia was established, with Žujović, Filip Kljajić, Branko Krsmanović, Nikola Grulović and Rodoljub Čolaković as members. This date was later celebrated in socialist Yugoslavia as Fighter's Day.

On July 5, a communist party proclamation appeared that called upon the Serbian people to struggle against the invaders. The Serbian people were reminded of their glorious past, and called to side with "invincible Slavic Russia" headed by Stalin, the greatest son of Russian people. Communists pointed out time had come for an armed struggle against invaders, urged people to organize partisan detachments, set fire to factories and warehouses, destroy railroads and communications, organise hiding of wheat, etc.

=== Chetniks ===
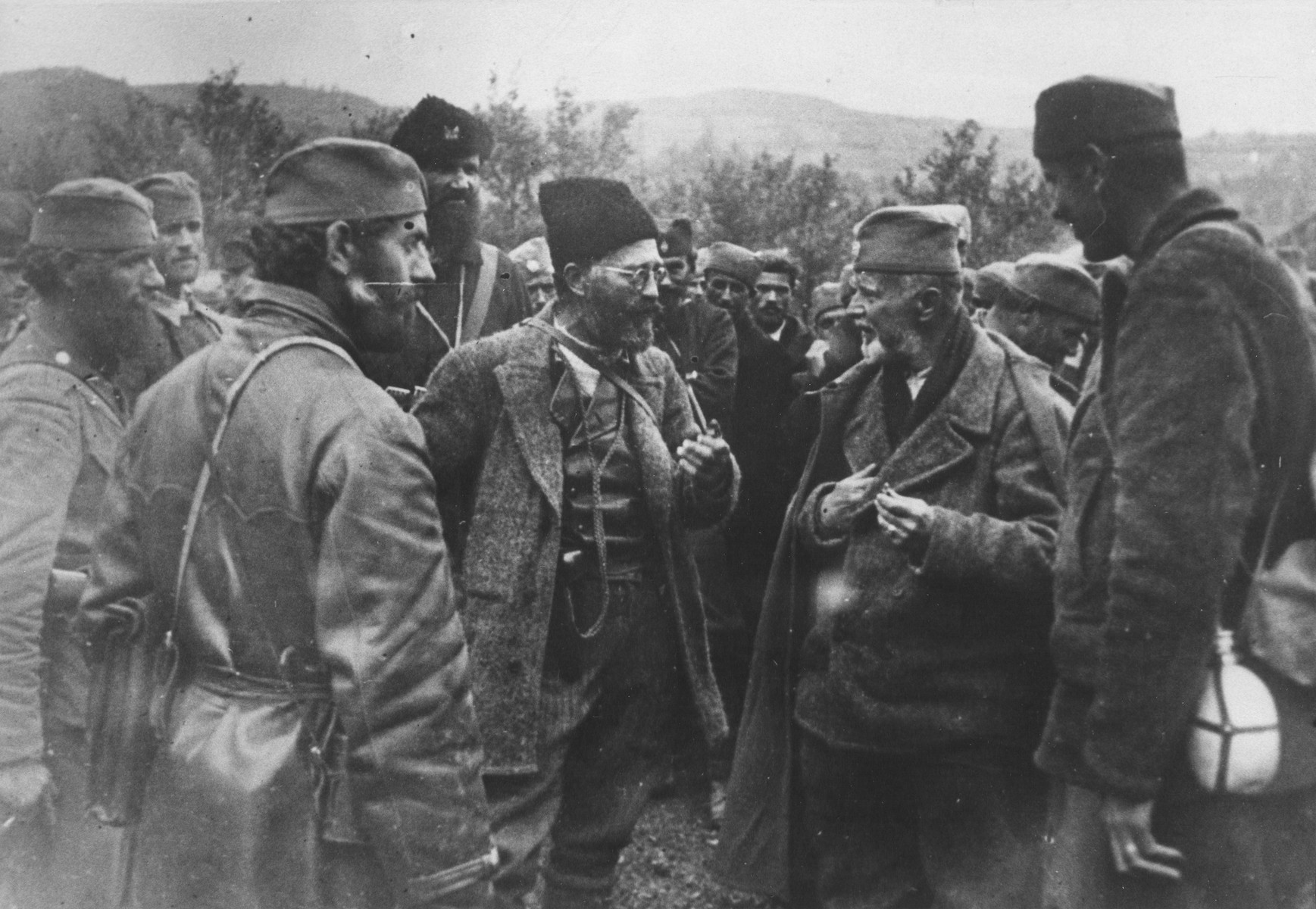
Mihailović confers with his men.

Yugoslav Army colonel Dragoljub Mihailović avoided falling into German hands during the invasion. He and his followers hid on the Ravna Gora plateau on Suvobor mountain, arriving on 13 May. It was an isolated area, with weak German presence and influence, and an intact local administration and gendarmerie. During the first months at Ravna Gora, Mihailović tried to come into contact with other officers who had also avoided capture or formed their own detachments, developed an intelligence network, came into contact with the government-in-exile and won local officials to his cause. With their help, Mihailović created lists of reservists and conscripts he would mobilise. The only civilians that were included in his organisation were members of the Serbian Cultural Club, such as Dragiša Vasić and Stevan Moljević.

Mihailović believed that the war would not end soon. He made his first public appearance at a village fair in Tometino Polje on 28 June, where he announced to the gathered people that preparations for armed combat were in place, but the moment for its beginning hadn't yet come.

== Resistance begins ==
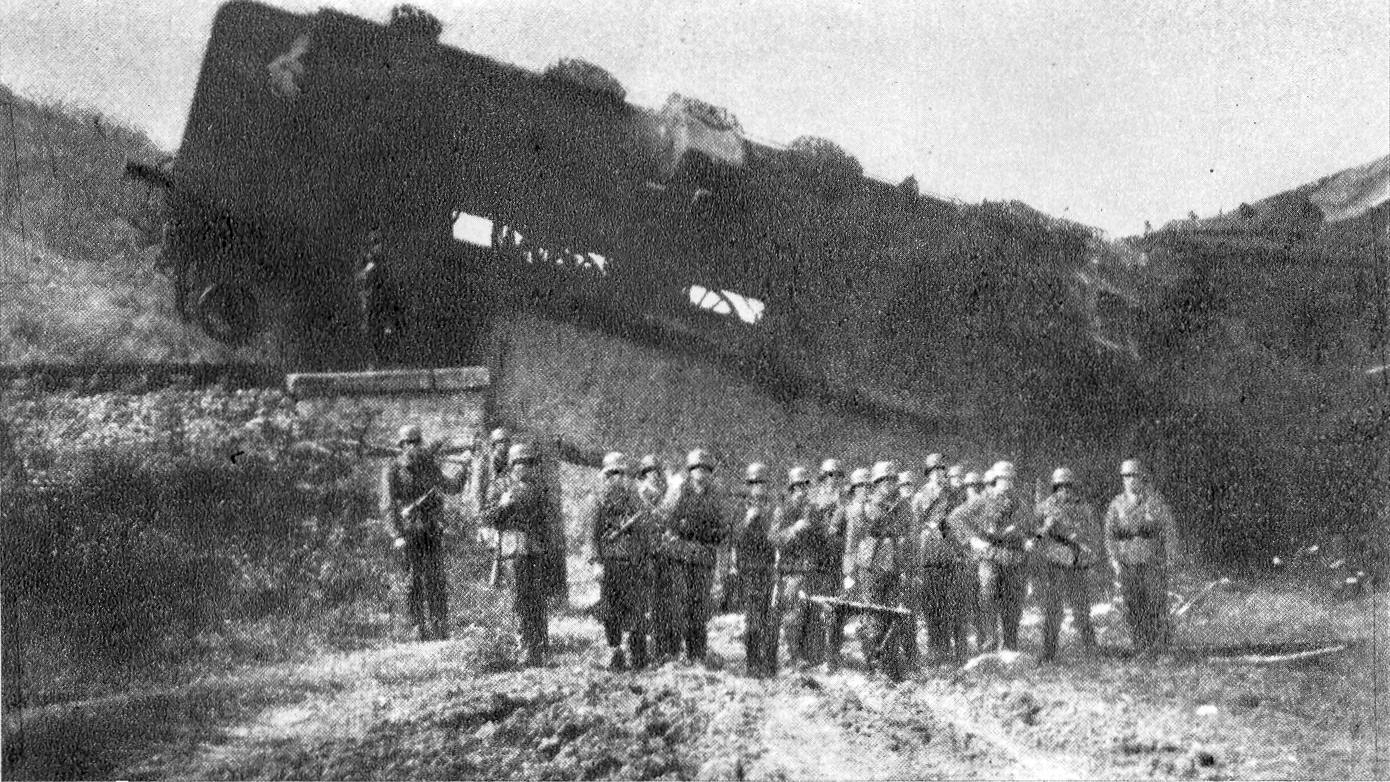
German train destroyed by partisans in Serbia 1941.

Western Serbia was chosen as the base for the uprising, due to its forests and hilly terrain, and a population which had provided strong resistance to invading Austrian forces in World War I. The first Partisan and Chetnik detachments were formed in the Valjevo area.

For the beginning of the uprising the Rađevina partisan detachment took armed action on 7 July 1941 in Bela Crkva near Krupanj. In Bela Crkva the traditional Ivanjdan midsummer village fair was held. A group of fifteen partisans, led by commander Miša Pantić and political commissar Žikica Jovanović Španac gathered people and called them to join in the fight against the German invaders. Speeches were given by Pantić, a doctor from Valjevo, and Jovanović, a journalist from Valjevo and combatant from the Spanish Civil War. Gendarmes Bogdan Lončar and Milenko Braković tried to break up the gathering, forbidden under the military occupation. The partisans opened fire and killed both gendarmes.

=== Spread of the uprising ===
The uprising spread from western Serbia to other parts of Serbia. During July and August many Party and SKOJ proclamations that called for armed struggle were printed. Communist groups cut communication lines along railways between Niš and Leskovac. The main power line of Radio Belgrade was cut already on 4 July. Saboteurs in Belgrade set fires on German trucks, garages and trains.

The Commissariat of Interior registered 220 incidents of sabotage in July. Attacks were carried out on police and gendarmerie stations, seats of local governments, rail lines. The village of Valjevska Kamenica was liberated on 22 July. German representative Felix Bender reported to Minister for Foreign Affairs that various groups of "determined communists consists of 60–100 members, who, partially well armed... carries out terrorist acts toward Serbian people, take or kill Serbian officials, make sabotages". Bender mentioned killings of German soldiers, attacks on German trains, trucks, and sabotage of military installations. He also reported that the gendarmerie inflicted losses on communists, but suffered losses as well.

=== Chetniks join the uprising ===
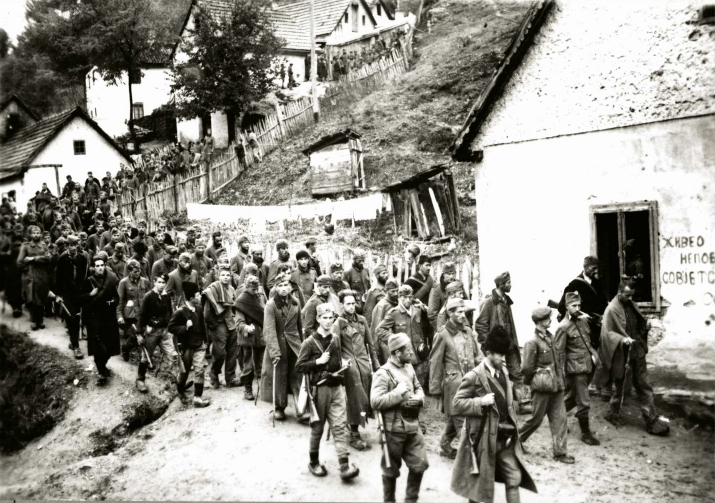
The Partisans and the Chetniks carried captured Germans through Užice, autumn 1941.

When the organized partisan struggle begun, a few ex-Army commanders, originally without Mihailović's approval, carried by the wave of the uprising, took part in combat. Mihailović didn't want to start his uprising, preferring to wait and build up his forces, waiting for a favourable moment. He thought that Germans were stronger in every way and resistance was futile and counter-productive. Participation of Chetnik forces in the uprising was largely forced by fear that the partisans would gain influence among the Serbian people. Former officers couldn't stand to watch how young boys and laymen from ranks of teachers, students, workers and peasants were waging battles. This was particularly true of officers who were compromised by their poor performance during the Axis invasion four months earlier and whom civilians considered incompetent cowards.

In late August Mihailović ordered the creation of Chetnik detachments, made up of recruits 20–30 years old. Their assignment would be to take power at the moment of popular uprising. Mihailović proclaimed himself the legitimate representative of the Yugoslav Royal Army and, on basis of Yugoslav law, demanded the enlistment of reservists 30–40 years old. These Chetnik units had an assignment to prevent pillaging and unnecessary violence, and at the same time, the actions of "destructive elements" (Communists).

At the end of August the first contacts were made between Partisans and Chetniks. Already on August 25, an agreement on joint attacks had been made by the commander of the Podrinje Partisan detachment and Captain Dragoslav Račić, a commander of the Cer Chetnik detachment. Joint Partisan-Chetnik actions against German forces came to the fore during taking of Krupanj and Gornji Milanovac, the battle of Šabac and the sieges of Valjevo and Kraljevo.

==== Battle of Loznica ====
Chetnik insurgents launched a surprise attack on the occupied town of Loznica on the morning of 31 August 1941, after the Germans refused the invitation to surrender sent by courier the previous night. Fighting for Loznica was the largest armed conflict with the Germans in occupied Yugoslavia until then.

==== Capture of Banja Koviljača ====
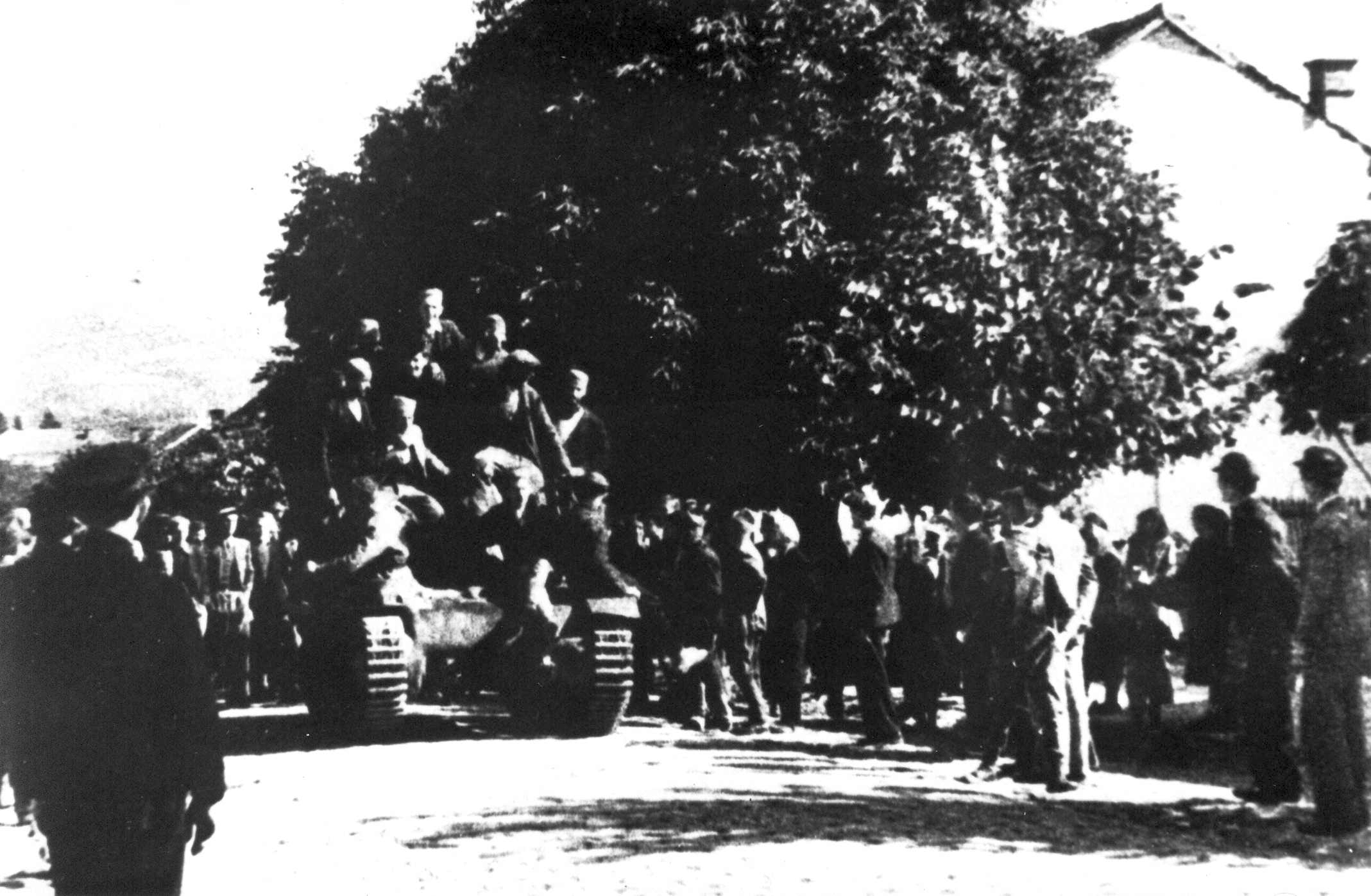
Captured German tank in Čačak, October 1941

Banja Koviljača was captured in a battle fought between 1 and 6 September 1941 between allied forces of Chetniks and Partisans on one side and German forces garrisoned in occupied Banja Koviljača (now Western Serbia) and Ustashe relief forces from Bosnia (then in NDH) on the Axis side. The battle took place soon after Chetniks captured Loznica on 31 August 1941. The attack on the German outpost in Banja Koviljača was the first major battle between Serb rebels and German forces by the end of the invasion of Yugoslavia. The action of Chetniks against the occupying German forces garrisoned in Loznica and Banja Koviljača was organized in a period of Partisan-Chetnik collaboration. The Battle of Banja Koviljača was the first battle where Chetniks and Partisans were allied against Axis forces.

==== Battle of Krupanj ====
After three days of fighting, Krupanj was liberated on September 3, 1941 by the Valjevo Partisan detachment and Chetniks led by Orthodox priest Vlada Zečević and his lieutenant Ratko Martinović. Zečević, Martinović and bulk of the Chetniks later joined the partisans.

==== Battle of Šabac ====
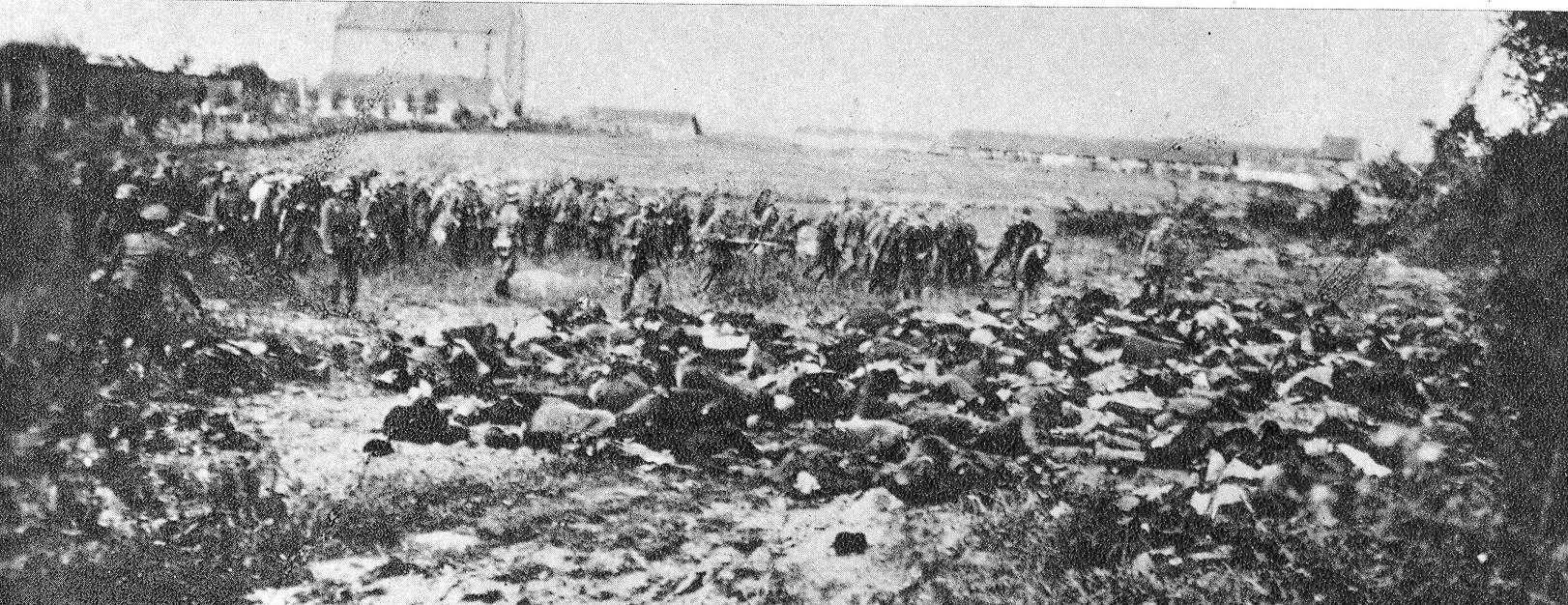
German mass murder of civilians in Šabac, Serbia 1941

Nebojša Jerković, a commander of the Mačva Partisan detachment, visited Chetnik captain Dragoslav Račić, a commander of the Cer Corps, to reach agreement on a joint attack on Šabac. The Battle of Šabac lasted from September 22 until September 24, when the 342nd German Division came in aid to the besieged Germans and broke the rebel encirclement. German soldiers, retaliating, killed some 1,000 men from Šabac and Mačva. The number of soldiers in the Mačva Partisan detachment dropped to half its initial forces. Deployment of the 342nd German Division in the Mačva operation marked the beginning of a major German counter-offensive on liberated territory.

==== Battle of Kruševac ====
The fighting between attacking rebel forces and Axis garrison lasted for four days.

On the first day Keserović's Rasina Detachment attacked the Kruševac garrison from Bagdala and Rasina. The Chetniks of the Rasina Detachment pushed the Germans from their positions on the town's periphery to its center and blocked them in three buildings in the town center. The Partisan Rasina Detachment was positioned between Obilićevo and the railway in Dedina and was unable to join the initial surprise attack of Chetnik forces on the first day. As soon as the attack on Kruševac began, Kosta Pećanac insisted to cancel it and to cancel the alliance between Chetniks and Partisans. In his order issued on 23 September and in his appeal to Serbs issued on 24 September, Pećanac condemned his own units that participated in the attack on Kruševac.

On the second day, Keserović canceled the attack, and retreated to join other Chetnik units under Brigadier General Ljubo Novaković in their attack on Axis-held Kraljevo. Therefore on the second day of the attack only the Chetnik Stalać Detachment and the small Partisan Rasina Detachment continued to attack the garrison, and German forces received reinforcements: infantry, cavalry and tanks from the Niš garrison.

Although the town was well defended the German garrison had 28 dead and 16 to 20 wounded soldiers, including the captain who was the commander of the German battalion and garrison. On the fourth day of the battle Kosta Pećanac and a large force of Chetniks reinforced the Axis garrison. The rebels gave up further attacks after having suffered 17 dead and 74 wounded. Keserović and Radojević issued a resolution and condemned Pećanac and Milan Nedić as traitors and invited people to join "National liberation Chetnik detachments" (Serbian: Hационално-ослободилачки четнички одреди) en masse. Pećanac sentenced Keserović and Radojević to death.

==== Battle of Gornji Milanovac ====
Yugoslav Partisans and Yugoslav army in homeland (known as Chetniks) in joint action freed Gornji Milanovac from the Nazi occupation. Gornji Milanovac was merged with the other released towns of the occupied Kingdom of Yugoslavia to form the short-lived Republic of Užice. At the head of that joint action was Zvonimir Vučković. During that battle two German tanks were trapped and now one of those is a monument on the exit from the town in the village of Nevade, while the other is a monument in Užice. (Hotchkiss H35)

==== Battle of Kraljevo ====
The siege of Kraljevo was the most important battle during the Uprising in Serbia in 1941. The siege lasted in period 9—31 October 1941. The battle was waged between besieging forces of the Chetniks and Yugoslav Partisans against German forces garrisoned in Kraljevo in the German-occupied territory of Serbia (modern-day Serbia).

The rebel forces had between 3,000 and 4,000 soldiers. The battle started on 9 October 1941 when Chetniks attacked German forces near Monastery of Žiča. Several days after the battle began in a reprisal for the attack on a German garrison, the German forces committed a massacre of approximately 2,000 civilians between 15 and 20 October, in an event known as the Kraljevo massacre.

On 23 October most of the Partisan forces left the siege of Kraljevo and regrouped their forces to attack Chetniks in Čačak, Užice and Požega. The rebels organized their last larger attack on Kraljevo on 31 October, using two tanks previously captured from German forces, but failed after suffering heavy casualties.

In early November most of the Chetnik forces besieging Kraljevo retreated to reinforce their positions in other towns in Western Serbia attacked by communist forces. On 20 November 1941 both rebel formations signed a truce, only to be soon again defeated by German offensive in December 1941 that forced Partisans to leave Serbia and Mihailović and his Chetniks to flee constant German pursuit.

== Republic of Užice ==
The Republic of Užice was a short-lived liberated Yugoslav territory and the first liberated territory in World War II Europe, organized as a military mini-state that existed in the autumn of 1941 in occupied Yugoslavia, more specifically the western part of the Territory of the Military Commander in Serbia. (Note: Official name of the occupied territory) The Republic was established by the Partisan resistance movement and its administrative centre was in the town of Užice.

== Initial German response ==
=== Government of National Salvation ===
The Government of National Salvation, also referred to as the "Nedić regime", was the second Serbian puppet government, after the Commissioner Government, established on the Territory of the (German) Military Commander in Serbia (Note: Official name of the occupied territory translated from German: Gebiet des Militärbefehlshaber Serbiens Hehn) during World War II. It was appointed by the German Military Commander in Serbia and operated from 29 August 1941 to October 1944. The Nedić regime enjoyed some support. The Prime Minister throughout was General Milan Nedić. The Government of National Salvation was evacuated from Belgrade to Kitzbühel, Austria in the first week of October 1944 before the German withdrawal from Serbia was complete. Nedić himself was captured by the Americans when they occupied Austria, and was subsequently handed over to the Yugoslav communist authorities to act as a witness against war criminals on the understanding he would be returned to American custody to face trial by the Allies. The Yugoslav authorities refused to return Nedić to American custody, and he died on 4 February 1946 after falling out the window of a Belgrade hospital, under circumstances which remain unclear.

=== Killings of civilians ===
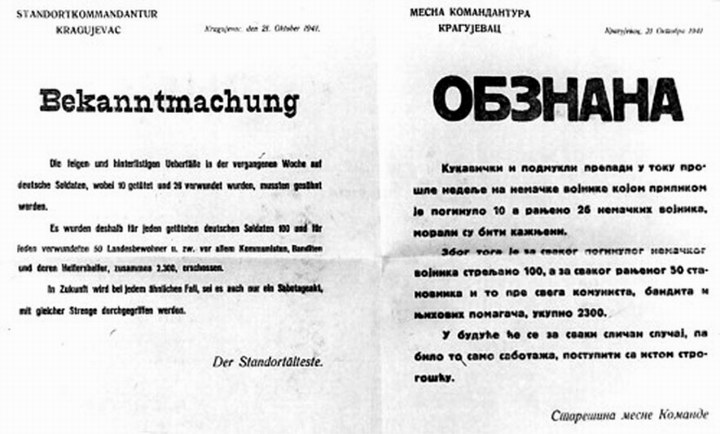
German announcement of killing 2,300 civilians in Kragujevac massacre as retaliation for 10 killed and 26 wounded Wehrmacht soldiers.

The Kragujevac massacre was the murder of Serbs, Jewish and Roma men and boys in Kragujevac, Serbia, by German Wehrmacht soldiers on 20 and 21 October 1941. All males from the town between the ages of sixteen and sixty were assembled by German troops and members of the collaborationist Serbian Volunteer Command (SDK) and Serbian State Guard (SDS), including high school students, and the victims were selected from amongst them. On 29 October 1941, Felix Benzler, the plenipotentiary of the German foreign ministry in Serbia, reported that 2,300 people were executed. Later investigations by the post-war Yugoslavian government came up with between 5,000 and 7,000 people executed, although these figures were never proven reliable. Subsequently, Serbian and German scholars have agreed on the figure of 2,778.

== Partisan-Chetnik split ==
In order to quell the uprising, Germans brought additional troops and carried out a campaign of severe reprisals against the civil population. The German actions forced Mihailović to withdraw his troops from combat, attack the Partisans and seek contact with the German administration in order to end hostilities. He met with representatives of the Wehrmacht in the village of Divci. Despite his offer, the Germans replied that they would soon bring armoured units that would end the uprising and that "the German Wehrmacht cannot burden itself with allies who join it from opportunistic reasons". Mihailović replied that he had to take some towns from Germans in order to prevent communists taking them, and that he didn't want to fight against the Germans. He tried to persuade the Germans of his unconditional loyalty and requested supplies for combat against the Partisans. He also asked the Germans that his "patriotic actions" remain secret so as to avoid for him the fate of Kosta Pećanac, who openly made agreement with the Axis, lost any influence with the Serbian people and became considered a traitor by his own people.

Despite Mihailović's offers, the Germans left him no option but unconditional surrender. From that time he waged relentless war against the Partisans. Chetnik actions against Partisans in southwest Serbia at the end of 1941 were parallel or nearly parallel with German actions against Partisans. The Partisan HG for Serbia issued a proclamation to the Serbian people on the treachery committed by Mihailović, saying he attacked the Partisans and sought to deceive honest Serbian peasants and Chetniks.

During fights between Chetniks and Partisans in western Serbia at the beginning of November 1941, Chetniks captured a few hundred partisans. Out of this number, Chetniks gathered 365 captured Partisans and on November 13, handled them to Nedić's and German troops, who either executed them or sent them to concentration camps in occupied Serbia, Germany or Norway. Concurrently with Mihailović's turn toward Germans, Yugoslav Prime Minister in exile Dušan Simović promoted him via Radio London for commander of all armed Yugoslav troops in the country.

== End of the uprising ==
=== Operation Uzice ===
Operation Uzice was the first major counter-insurgency operation by the German Wehrmacht on the occupied territory of the Kingdom of Yugoslavia. The operation was directed against the Užice Republic, the first of several "free territories" liberated by the Yugoslav Partisans. It was named after the town of Užice, and is associated with the First Enemy Offensive (Serbo-Croatian Latin: Prva neprijateljska ofenziva/ofanziva) in Yugoslavian historiography. The security forces of the German-installed puppet regime of Milan Nedić also participated in the offensive.

After the offensive commenced on 20 September 1941, the Partisans initially received assistance from local Chetnik formations in opposing the Germans, but after weeks of disagreement and low-level conflict between the two insurgent factions about how the resistance should proceed, the Chetniks launched an attack on the Partisans in the towns of Užice and Požega on November 1 which resulted in the Chetniks being repulsed. The Partisans then counter-attacked decisively, but by early December had been driven from liberated area by the German and Serb collaborationist offensive.

=== Operation Mihailovic ===
Operation Mihailovic was the final German anti-guerrilla offensive to suppress the Serbian Chetnik detachments of the Yugoslav Army, headed by Colonel Dragoljub Mihailović. The offensive took place from 4 to 9 December 1941 near Šumadija, in the Territory of the Military Commander in Serbia.

== Aftermath ==
The uprising in Serbia failed to cause any serious casualties to Axis forces, which suffered 200 soldiers killed and 400 wounded. About 4,000 men of the rebels were killed during the fighting, while 35,000 civilians were killed in Serbia as victims of German reprisals.

== See also ==
- World War II in Yugoslavia
- Republic of Užice
- Operation Užice
- Kragujevac massacre

== Literature ==
- Давидовић, Горан (2001). Чачани на опсади Краљева октобра 1941. године – Хронологија догађаја. Kraljevo: Научни скуп Краљево октобра 1941.
- Bailey, Ronald H. (1980). Partisans and Guerrillas. Vol. 12. Time-Life Books. ISBN 978-0783557199.
- Dimitrijević, Bojan B. (2014). Vojska Nedićeve Srbije: Oružane snage srpske vlade, 1941–1945 [The Army of Nedić's Serbia: The Armed Forces of the Serbian Government, 1941–1945] (in Serbian). Belgrade, Serbia: Službeni Glasnik. ISBN 978-86-519-1811-0.
- Hehn (1971). Unknown Title.
- Kurapovna, Marcia Christoff (2009). Shadows on the Mountain: The Allies, the Resistance, and the Rivalries That Doomed WWII Yugoslavia. John Wiley. ISBN 978-0-470-08456-4.
- Lampe, John R. (2000). Yugoslavia as History: Twice There Was a Country. CUP. ISBN 978-0521773577.
- MacDonald, David Bruce (2002). Balkan holocausts? : Serbian and Croatian victim-centred propaganda and the war in Yugoslavia ([Online-Ausg.] ed.). Manchester University Press. p. 142. ISBN 0719064678.
- Karchmar, Lucien (1973). Draz̆a Mihailović and the Rise of the C̆etnik Movement, 1941-1942. Department of History, Stanford University.
- Kovbasko, Budimka (1971). Kriva reka: (kopaonička). Istorijski arhiv; Brue, Zajodnica kulture.
- Marković, Savo (2004). "Benediktinska opatija svete Marije Ratačke kod Bara, Acta diplomatica et iuridica". Croatica Christiana Periodica. 28 (53).
- Marković, Predrag J. (7 July 2011). "Zaboravljena antifašistička tradicija". vreme.com.
- Minić, Miloš (1993). Oslobodilački ili građanski rat u Jugoslaviji 1941-1945. Agencija "Mir". p. 244. ISBN 9788682295013. "...Зечевићем и поручником Мартиновићем који су окупили у свој четнички одред неколико стотина људи из тог краја..Њихов одред учествовао је у борби заједно са Рађевским батаљоном и у тој борби је један немачки батаљон био после тешке борбе разбијен и заробљен, и Крупањ ослобођен."
- Mitrović, Dojčilo (1975). Zapadna Srbija 1941 [i.e. hiljadu devetsto četrdeset prve]. Nolit.
- Nikolić, Kuzman (1999). Napad na Kruševac 1941 (in Serbian). Kruševac, Serbia: Narodna Biblioteka Kruševac.
- Pajić, S. (4 September 2011). "Decenijama palio sveću zaboravljenom heroju" (in Serbian). Blic. "u oslobođenju Banje Koviljače prvi put su zajedno delovali četnici i partizani"
- Pavlowitch, Stevan K. (2002). Serbia: The History Behind the Name. London: C. Hurst. ISBN 978-185065-476-6.
- Pavlowitch, Stevan K. (2008). Hitler's New Disorder: The Second World War in Yugoslavia. Columbia University Press. ISBN 978-1850658955.
- Petranović, Branko (1992). Srbija u Drugom svetskom ratu 1939-1945. Beograd: Vojnoizdavački i novinski centar.
- Tomasevich, Jozo (1969). "Yugoslavia During the Second World War". In Vucinich, Wayne S. (ed.). Contemporary Yugoslavia: Twenty Years of Socialist Experiment. University of California Press. pp. 59–118.
- Tomasevich, Jozo (1975). War and Revolution in Yugoslavia, 1941–1945: The Chetniks. Stanford University Press. ISBN 978-0804708579.
- Tomasevich, Jozo (2001). War and Revolution in Yugoslavia, 1941–1945: Occupation and Collaboration. Stanford University Press. ISBN 978-0804736152.
