= Sloboda Monument =

Freedom Monument
- Споменик Слобода
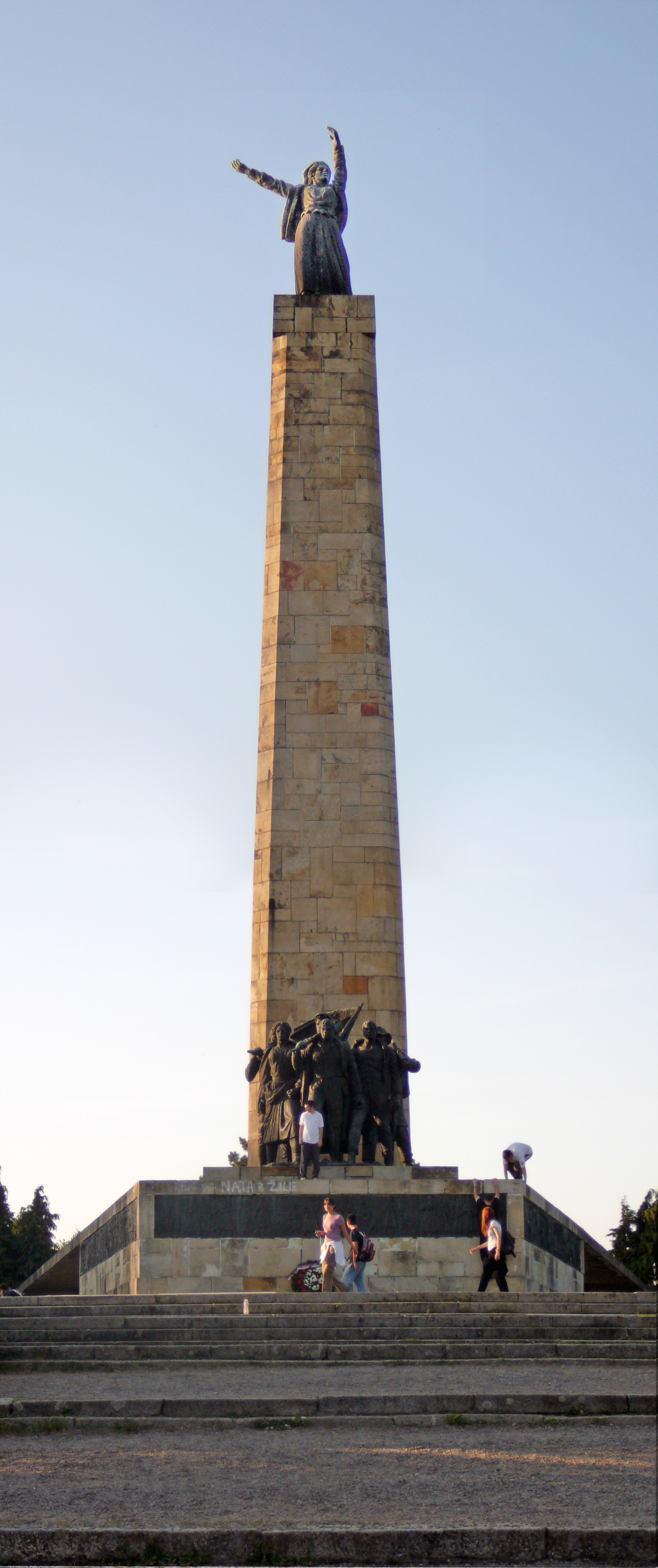
- Monument Freedom on Iriški venac
- Interactive map of Freedom Monument

Freedom Monument or Sloboda Monument (Serbian Cyrillic: Споменик Слобода) is a large memorial located at Iriški venac, the central peak of Fruška Gora mountain in Vojvodina, Serbia. Erected in 1951, the monument honors the fighters who gave their lives during the National Liberation War and serves as a lasting symbol of the anti-fascist resistance of the people of Vojvodina during World War II. It was officially unveiled on 7 July 1951, coinciding with the tenth anniversary of the Uprising of the People of Serbia. The monument was designed by renowned sculptor Sreten Stojanović, one of the leading figures of modern Yugoslav sculpture.

The composition consists of a tall stone obelisk rising from a massive pedestal, crowned by a bronze female figure symbolizing Victory, with arms uplifted in a powerful gesture of defiance and freedom. At the base stands a sculptural group of Partisan fighters, while the surrounding walls are adorned with bronze reliefs portraying scenes from the struggle and liberation of Yugoslavia.
