= Radanovci, Kosjerić =

Radanovci Радановци
- Village
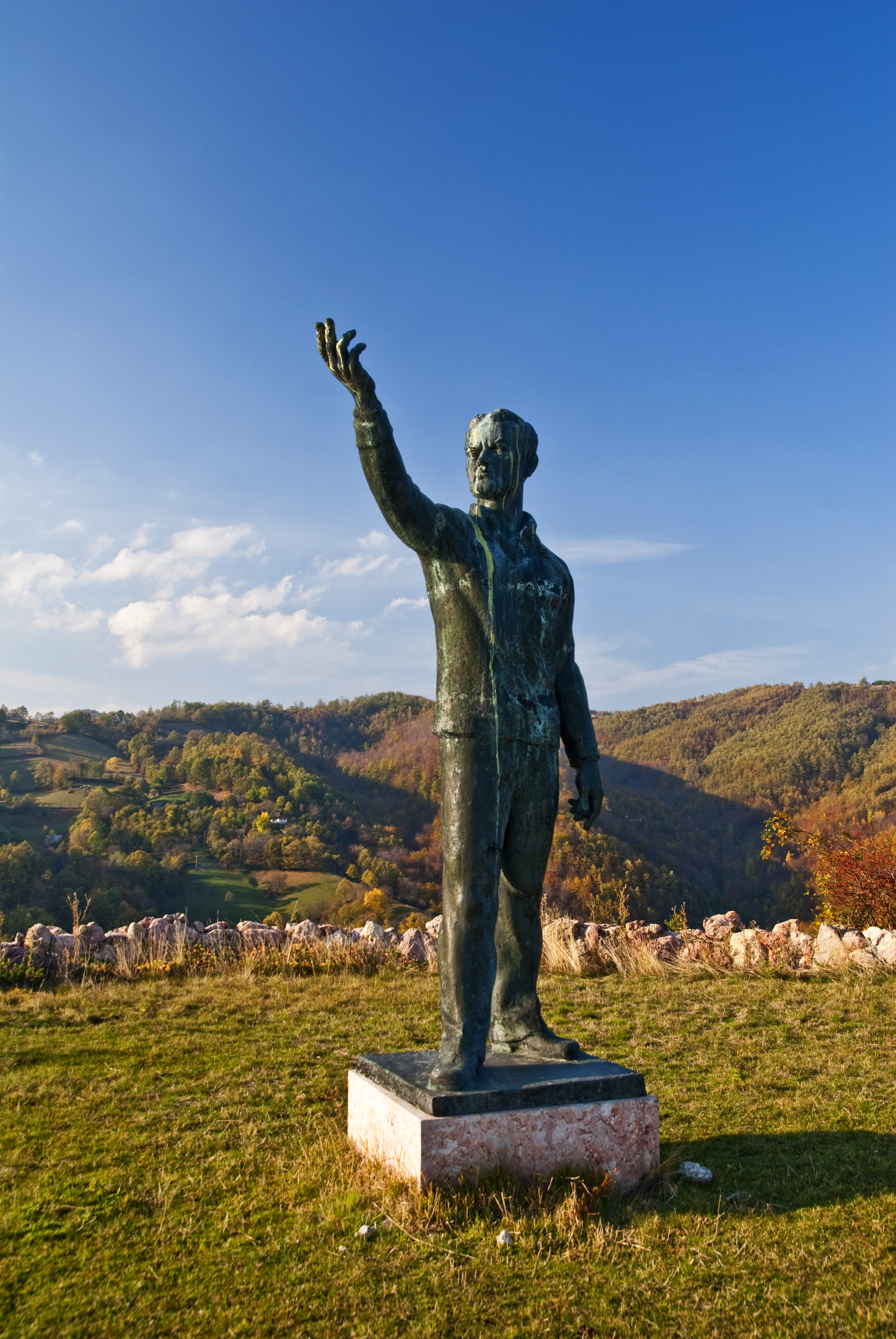
- Monument to war hero Žikica Jovanović Španac at the place of his death

- Location within Serbia
- Coordinates: 44.080°N 19.858°E
- Country: Serbia
- District: Zlatibor District
- Municipality: Kosjerić

Population (2011)
  - Total: 369
- Time zone: UTC+1 (CET)
  - Summer (DST): UTC+2 (CEST)

Radanovci (Serbian Cyrillic: Радановци) is a village in the municipality of Kosjerić in western Serbia. According to the 2011 census, the village has a population of 369 inhabitants.
