= Žikica Jovanović Španac =

Yugoslav partisan and republican volunteer in the Spanish Civil War

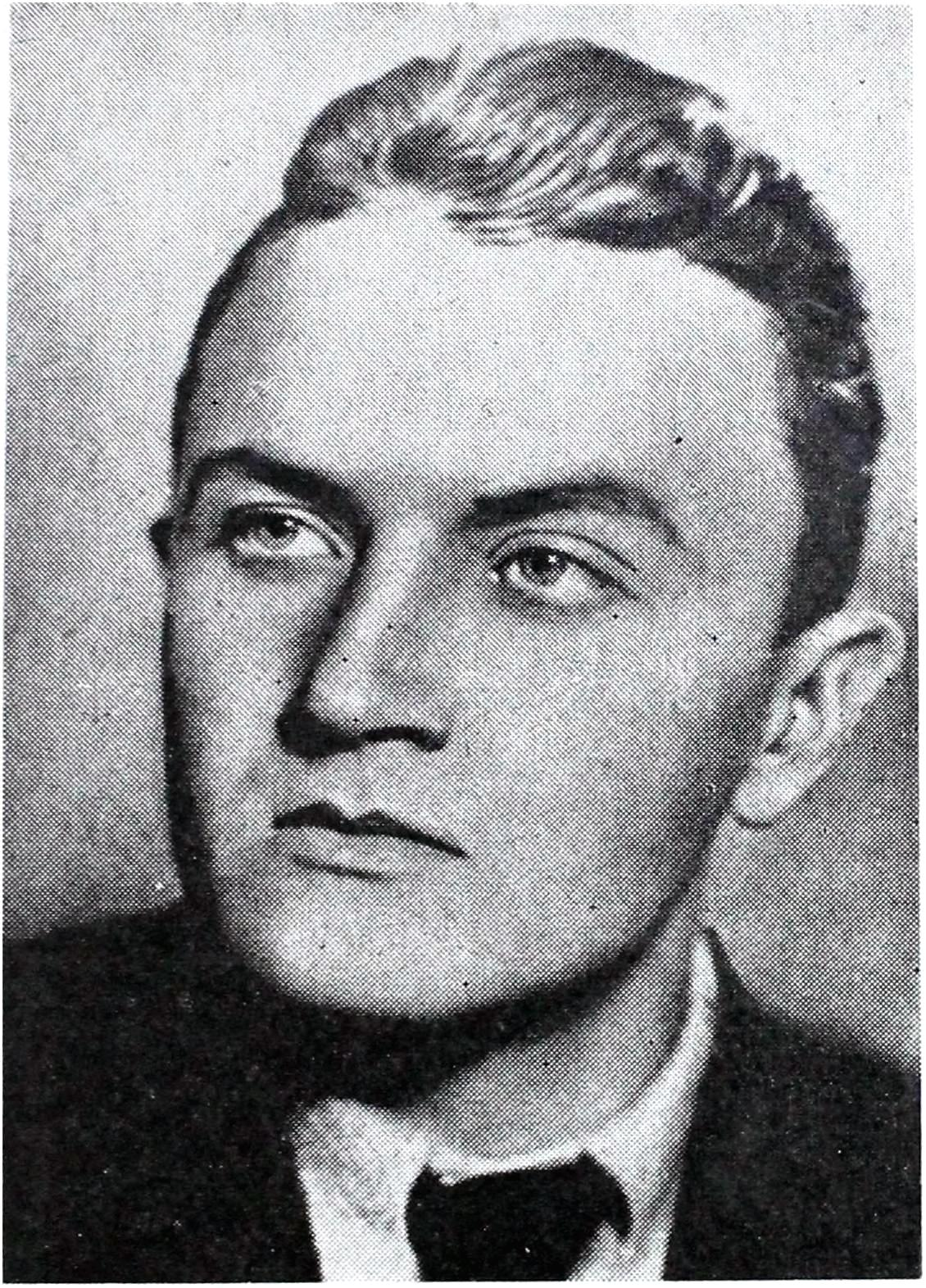
Žikica Jovanović Španac

Živorad "Žikica" Jovanović (Serbian Cyrillic: Живорад „Жикица" Јовановић; 17 March 1914 – 13 March 1942), nicknamed Španac (Шпанац, "The Spaniard") was a Yugoslav partisan, Spanish-trained commando and republican volunteer in the Spanish Civil War and is credited for initiating the anti-fascist struggle in Yugoslavia during World War II. He was a skilled guerrilla fighter and organizer of guerrilla units in Serbia, largely tied to his intense Spanish Civil War activities. He enjoyed enormous prestige in Yugoslav communist ranks, and in 1941 he even disobeyed direct orders of Josip Broz Tito to leave from Serbia to Bosnia with his units.

== Biography ==
=== Before World War II ===
Jovanović was born in 1914 in Valjevo, Central Serbia, related to an extended family of landowners and merchants. He graduated from the high school there, and later enrolled the Faculty of Philosophy at the University of Belgrade. However, before completing his studies, Jovanović, like many other idealists across Europe, volunteered to help the Spanish Republic rebuff a Fascist Coup launched in the summer of 1936. He fought with some distinction in the Spanish Civil War, and became a respected guerrilla warfare specialist. He participated in the Madrid University City Battle between the Republican volunteers and the Spanish Army of Africa. He fought at the head of the Balkan Volunteer Brigade in a number of campaigns such as the Battle of the Ebro and the Battle of Teruel until the fall of Barcelona in 1939, which marked the collapse of the Republic.

He was one of the few remaining International Brigades volunteers who fled over the frontier to France, only to be interned by the Gestapo as an enemy alien following the Nazi invasion of France. It is believed that, along with others, he managed to escape via Marseille, and walked much of the way home after landing in Italy.

Among his compatriots and fellow brigadiers, he was later nicknamed "Španac" (Spaniard) for this time spent in struggle along the Spanish people for whom he had developed a tremendous affinity.

=== World War II ===
In April 1941 following the Axis invasion of Yugoslavia and Greece, Jovanović wanted to join the army, but was rejected under suspicion of anti-state activities having been a Revolutionary suspect in the so-called White Terror of King Alexander during the 1930s, and later, Prince Regent Pavle.

Three months later, after joining the Partisan movement led by Josip Broz Tito, he is reputed to have started the war against fascist occupiers. On July 7, 1941, he shot two members of the gendarmerie, at a fair in Bela Crkva. Then, mounting the steps of the local town hall, he fired into the air to summon the crowd with his two trademark Webley revolvers, giving a rousing speech that called upon the proletarian class of Yugoslavia to destroy the "beasts of Fascism", uttering the words that became the rallying cry of the Yugoslav Communist Party: "Death to Fascism, freedom for the people". Whether the actual revolt began in relation to these events, or indeed began as a result of simultaneously localized acts of sabotage organized across many districts cells of the Central Committee of the Yugoslav Communist Party is unclear. The official history of the communist Yugoslavia regarded the actions of Jovanović as the beginning of the anti-fascist struggle in Yugoslavia, and July 7 would become a national holiday in Serbia as the "Fighter's Day".

In the days and weeks that followed, a massive provincial revolt grew which is referred to as "the Uprising" (Ustanak), coinciding with the Yugoslav Communist Party instruction from the Comintern following the Axis invasion of the USSR.

==== Death ====
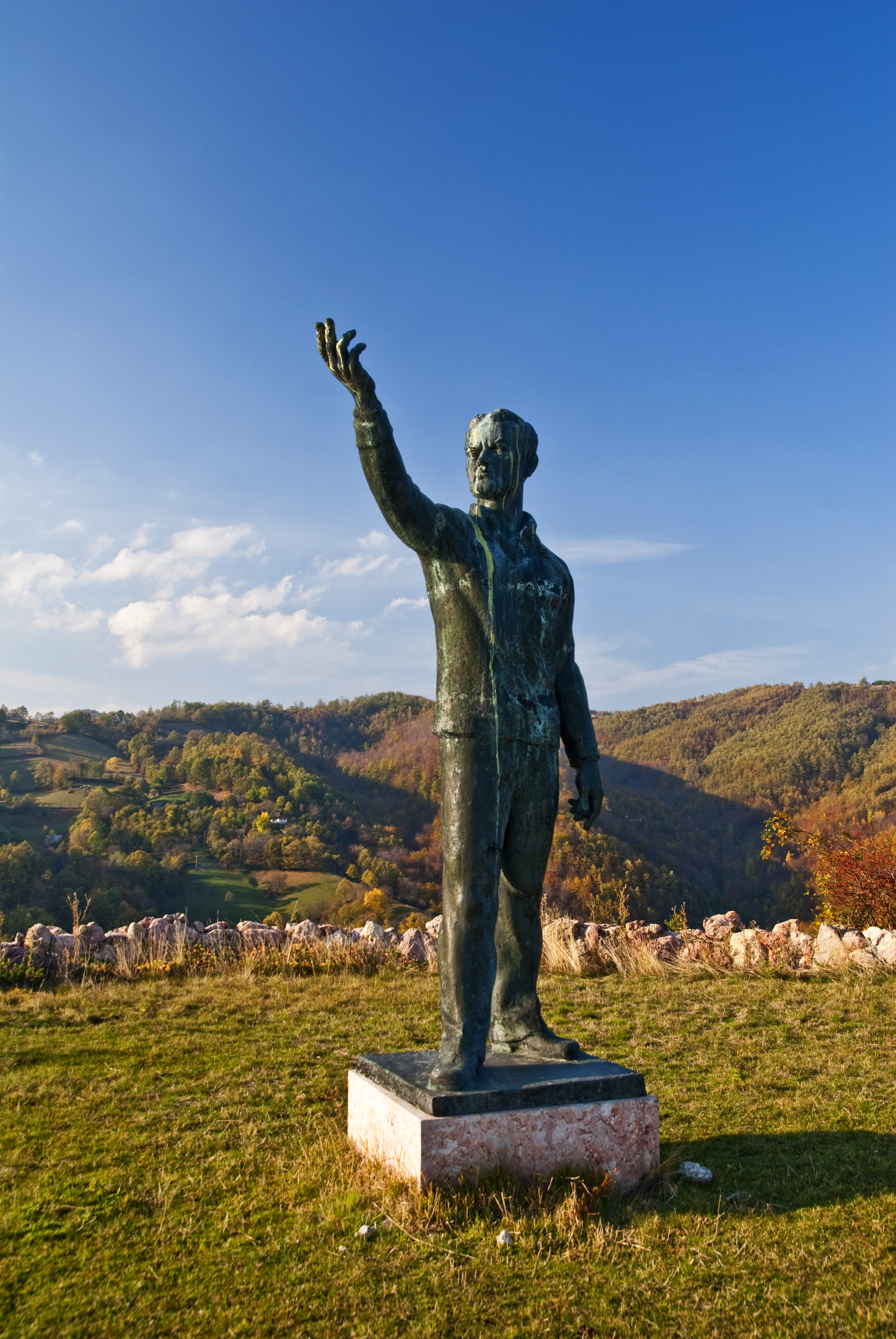
Monument in Radanovci

Žikica Jovanović "Španac" died in the village of Radanovci (Serbia) on 13 March 1942, in a battle against the Chetniks, Yugoslav royalists, and a German police battalion after having covered the retreat of a group of Partisans whose positions had been betrayed by their fellow countrymen.

== Legacy ==
Jovanović was proclaimed a People's Hero of Yugoslavia on 6 July 1945.

Today Španac has a number of schools and a hospital in Valjevo named after him. Before the 1990s, the Yugoslav regime often cited him as a role model, regularly celebrated his life by dedicating monuments and public venues to the warrior of the Spanish Revolution. Even in 21st century he is remembered as a warrior, guerilla fighter and an impulsive young idealist and not as a politically engaged person. He has universal appeal to most of political options in Serbia, as well as in other ex-Yugoslav countries.

His two victims shot on 7 July 1941 were rehabilitated by the district court in Šabac in 2009 and proclaimed to have been innocent. Both policemen killed now have monuments in Bela Crkva.

== See also ==
- Yugoslavia in World War II
- Yugoslav Partisans
