= Veselin Misita =

Serbian military commander (1904–1941)

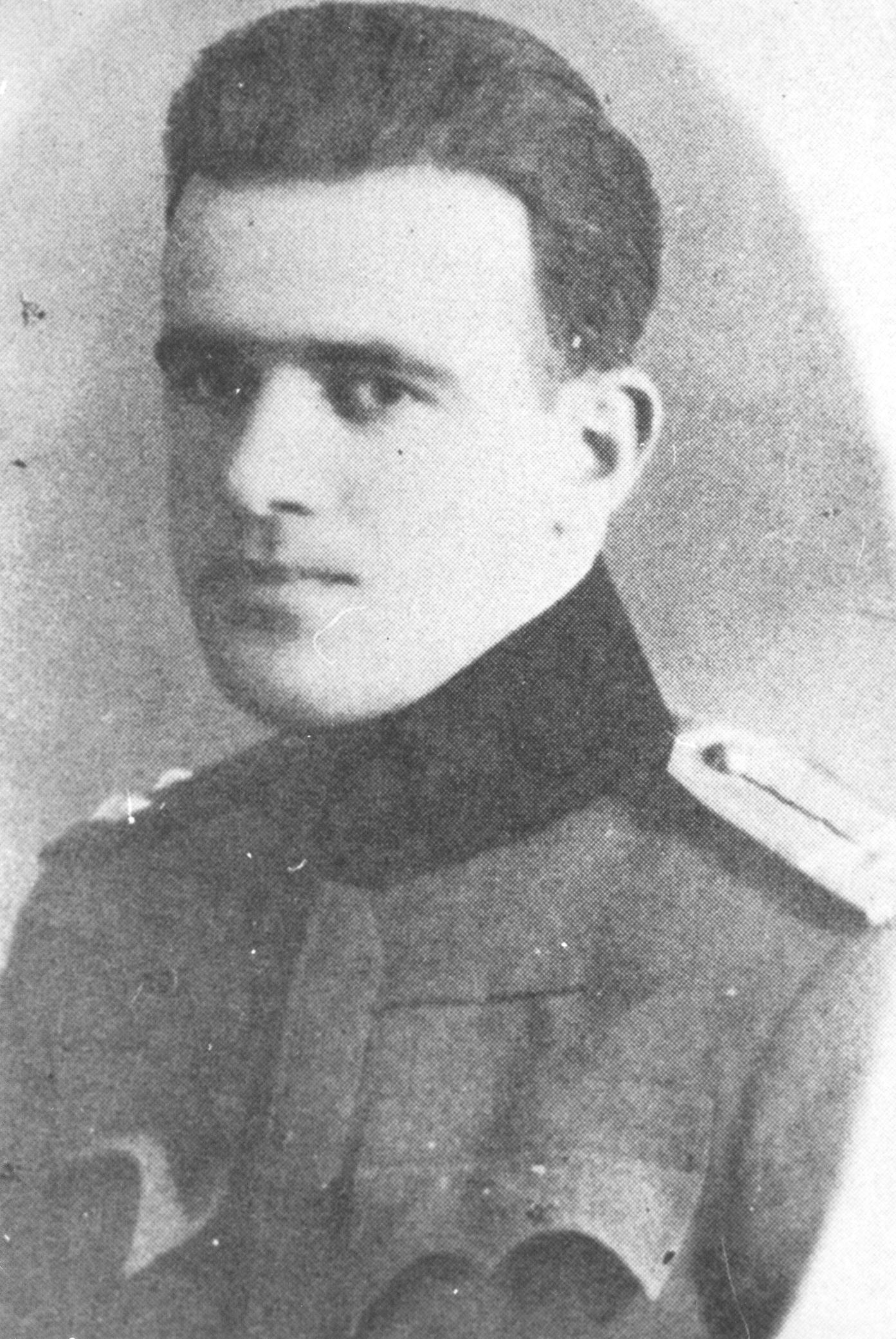
- Born: 19 March 1904; Buna, Bosnia and Herzegovina, Austria-Hungary
- Died: 31 August 1941 (aged 37); Loznica, Serbia
- Military career
- Allegiance: Kingdom of Yugoslavia; Chetniks
- Branch: Jadar Chetnik detachment
- Service years: 1934–1941
- Rank: Lieutenant colonel, Colonel (posthumously)
- Conflicts: World War II; Uprising in Serbia (1941); Battle of Loznica †
- Awards: Order of Karađorđe's Star

Veselin Misita (Serbian Cyrillic: Веселин Мисита; 19 March 1904 – 31 August 1941) was a Serb military commander holding the rank of lieutenant colonel in the Royal Yugoslav Army during World War II.

Misita is best known for leading the victorious Battle of Loznica in 1941 in which he was killed. Loznica became the first city in Europe liberated of fascists in August 1941.

== Death and legacy ==
Misita was killed while leading the victorious Battle of Loznica in 1941. Historian Branko Petranović argues that Misita carried out this action in order to pre-empt a Partisan attack on Loznica.

The Royal Yugoslav government-in-exile in London posthumously promoted Veselin Misita, regarded as the first insurgent, to the rank of colonel and awarded him the Order of the Karađorđe’s Star.

Josip Broz Tito's biographer Vladimir Dedijer described Misita's death as a great loss for the uprising. On 31 August 2008, the deputy speaker of the Serbian National Assembly, Božidar Delić of the Serbian Radical Party, dedicated a plaque to Misita in the Vuk Karadžić Square in Loznica. One of the people present was the man who had applied for the plaque to be installed, Božidar Panić, who had idolised Misita in his youth, and had lit a candle for him every year.

Misita is a maternal relation to Vojislav Šešelj, whose mother's maiden name was Danica Misita.
