= May consultations =

Meeting in Zagreb to discuss the Yugoslav strategy for fighting WWII

The May consultations were an underground gathering of the Central Committee (Politburo) of the Communist Party of Yugoslavia (CPY) and leaders of its regional branches held after World War II in Yugoslavia started, on the initiative of Josip Broz Tito in early May 1941 in Zagreb, at the time part of the so-called Independent State of Croatia (modern-day Croatia).

The exact place and date of the consultations is unknown, but based on the first records about it, it is assumed that it was held in Zagreb at the beginning of May 1941. The participants were communists from regional committees of Croatia, Slovenia and Montenegro. The communists from Serbia and Macedonia did not attend it. The purpose of the consultations was to discuss the reasons for the defeat of the Yugoslav Royal Army during the Axis invasion of Yugoslavia and the consequences of the Axis occupation of Yugoslavia, and consequent further directives for the members of the CPY.

The conclusions were subsequently interpreted and published in different records, and contained several key points aimed against Greater Serbian reactionary bourgeoisie, considered by them to be truly at fault for the war, and in favor of a Croatian state that would not actually be a fascist puppet state. At the time, however, their main point was to present to the Yugoslav public that communists of Yugoslavia had plans to struggle against the Axis occupation despite the Molotov–Ribbentrop Pact.

The CPY decided to organize the Military committees with each of its regional branches in Yugoslavia, similar to the Military committee of the Politburo established on 10 April 1941.

== April meetings of communists in Zagreb ==
After the beginning of the Axis invasion of Yugoslavia during April 1941, the Central Committee of the CPY and the Communist Party of Croatia held several meetings in April 1941 about the activities of the communists in Axis occupied Yugoslavia. This meetings determined the necessity to organize May consultations with representatives of the national and regional Yugoslav communist leaders. On 15 April 1941 the CPY published proclamation from which Tito in his later interpretations emphasized that "It was necessary to inform people in advance - the struggle will be very bloody because there will be no return to old Yugoslavia, in which workers were exploited and people without any rights".

== Date of the consultations ==
The first sources, including text published in Proleter, explained that the consultations were organized in the beginning of May 1941. Different later interpretations about the exact date of the consultations from Vladimir Dedijer, a main official biographer of Josip Broz, raised doubts that this consultations even happened at all. Serbian historian Veselin Đuretić believed that the consultations have never happened. The communist historiography explained the different interpretations of the exact date with necessity to keep the date as secret, but this argument is not valid.

== Participants ==
The consultations of the Central Committee of the Communist Party of Yugoslavia were initiated by Josip Broz Tito and attended by delegates from almost all parts of Axis occupied Yugoslavia. The meeting was attended by all members of the Politburo except Aleksandar Ranković:

- Josip Broz Tito - general secretary of the CPY
- Edvard Kardelj - member of Politburo from Slovenia
- Rade Končar - member of Politburo and political secretary of the central committee of the Communist Party of Croatia
- Milovan Đilas - member of Politburo from Montenegro
- Ivan Milutinović - member of Politburo from Montenegro
- Franc Leskošek - member of Politburo from Slovenia
- Svetozar Vukmanović Tempo - member of Politburo from Montenegro

Aleksandar Ranković was at the time secretary of the Central Committee of the Communist Party of Croatia and member of Politburo who went to Belgrade to order Serbian communists to return to Belgrade after they left it and went to rural places. Although many different sources published some information about participation of some communist representatives from Serbia, according to Blagoje Nešković, nobody from Serbian regional communist committee was present at the consultations. The reliable historical literature also does not mention participation of any member of CPY from Serbia.

The secretary of the regional committee of CPY for Macedonia refused to send their delegates to Zagreb, the regional committee for Macedonia was disbanded. The Macedonian communists stated that they are subordinated to Bulgarian communists, basically agreeing with territorial aspiration of Greater Bulgarian fascists.

== Discussions ==
The purpose of the consultations was to discuss the reasons for defeat of Yugoslav Army and consequences of Axis occupation of Yugoslavia and consequent further directives for the members CPY.

Milovan Đilas explained in his later memories that the CPY blamed German and English capitalistic imperialists for the World War II, emphasizing that English capitalists are more dangerous and that people of Yugoslavia should align with Soviet Union. Tito emphasized that English capitalists are careless "English proponents of war together with Greater Serbian chauvinist who are pushing the country into war bloodbath with their provocative actions". To counter such activities the CPY decided to organize Military committees with each of its regional branches in Yugoslavia, similar to the Military committee of the Politburo established on 10 April 1941.

One of the most important remarks of the leaders of Yugoslav Communist Party was their determined rejection of accusations coming from Greater Serbian circles that Croats are responsible for "quick capitulation of Yugoslav Army". The Yugoslav Communists concluded that most important reason for quick defeat of Yugoslav Army in April war was policy of Greater Serbian bourgeoisie which exploited for more than 20 years people of Yugoslavia. The Yugoslav communists underlined that they know that Serbs have nothing in common with those treacherous Serbian gentlemen. The Yugoslav communists emphasized that Serbian reactionary bourgeoisie is guilty for the tragedy of Serbs and all other Yugoslav nations and that Serbs will first invite them to meet the justice at the right time because Serbian bourgeoisie is main cause of all evil that happened to Serbs and other nations of Yugoslavia.

The Yugoslav Communists rejected accusations of Ustaše propaganda that they were against Independent State of Croatia (NDH) because they were against independence of the Croats. The conclusions of the May consultations rejected such accusations and emphasized that Yugoslav Communists are not against independence of Croats, underlining that majority of Croats and Croatian nationalists knew very well that the main cause of the struggle of Yugoslav communists is liberation of all Yugoslav nations from exploitation of the Greater Serbian bourgeoisie, but in the first place for liberation of Croat nation. The CPY stated that it is against NDH because it is not an independent Croatia, but a simple Italian province subjected to robbery of Italian and German imperialist thieves. That kind of "independent" Croatia is what they are against, together with 99% of Croats.

== Written records ==
No written records from this consultations were kept, the exact date of the consultations and exact place where it occurred is unknown, including the composition of the participants. There are no written records which could be formal direct result of the consultations, the introductory text presented by Tito, the text of the resolution or scripts were never published. In June 1941, after he went to Belgrade, Tito published a text about the May consultations in "Proleter", an organ of the Communist Party of Yugoslavia, only in June 1941 in German-occupied Belgrade.

The main purpose of the decisions was to present to Yugoslav public that communists of Yugoslavia had plans to struggle against Axis despite the fact the Soviet Union had a pact of non-aggression with Nazi Germany (which would unravel on 22 June 1941).

According to some sources, Milovan Đilas in his memories published 30 years later explained the reasons for destruction of the scripts: The Yugoslav Communists reached decision to struggle against Serbs with main aim to establish communist regime in Yugoslavia.

The absence of the written documents from this consultations and different interpretations of the key details brought into doubt that these consultations has even occurred.

== Report to Comintern about the consultations ==
After May consultations Tito went to German-occupied Belgrade where he resided until September 1941. At that time the Soviet Union had its embassy in Belgrade which was active even after the Axis occupied Yugoslavia because the Soviet Union and Germany were still allies until 22 June 1941. Tito delivered report to Moscow through an officer in the Soviet Embassy in Belgrade. His report had two main points:

- The CPY preserved its continuity although Yugoslavia is occupied
- The CPY survived as unified political party although Axis members divided Yugoslavia and annexed some of its territories

== Sources ==
- Glišić, Venceslav; Borković, Milan (1975). Komunistička partija Jugoslavije u Srbiji 1941-1945. Rad.
- Kostić, Svetozar (1967). Vojvodina 1941: Radovi i diskusije sa skupa istoričara u Subotici 8. i 10. decembra 1966. god. Pokrajinski odbor Društva istoričara SR Srbije za Vojvodinu.
- Đuretić, Veselin (1997). Nasilje nad srpskim ustankom: opsene naroda u ime "Rusije i komunizma". Srpska akademija nauka i umetnosti. ISBN 9788671790246.
- Perazić, Gavro (2001). Rambuje ili rat: međunarodno-pravna dilema. Novinsko-izdavački centar "Vojska". ISBN 9788675300243.
- Nikolić, Kosta (2000). Komunisti u Kraljevini Jugoslaviji: od socijal-demokratije do stalinizma : 1919-1941. LIO.
- Jelić, Ivo (1984). Magazine of contemporary history. Institut.
- Vujnović, Stevo (1986). Vojna organizacija jugoslovenske revulucije [sic]. Partizanska knj.
