= Bela Crkva (Krupanj) =

Village in Serbia

Bela Crkva Бела Црква
- Village
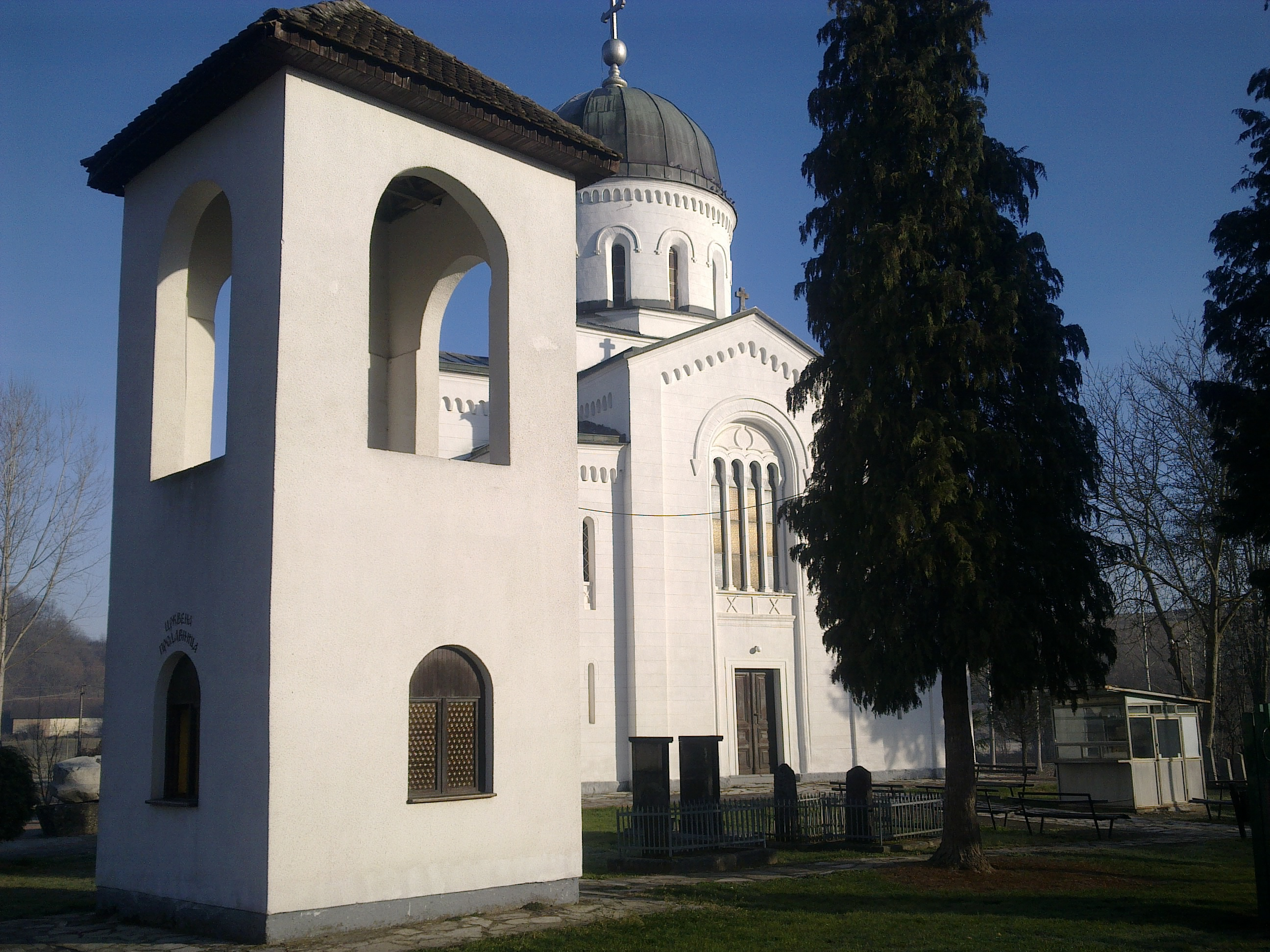
- A church in Bela Crkva
- Interactive map of Bela Crkva
- Coordinates: 44°23′39″N 19°28′52″E
- Country: Serbia
- Administrative District: Mačva District
- Municipality: Krupanj
- Time zone: UTC+1 (CET)
  - Summer (DST): UTC+2 (CEST)
- Postal code: 15313
- Area code: 015
- Vehicle registration: LO

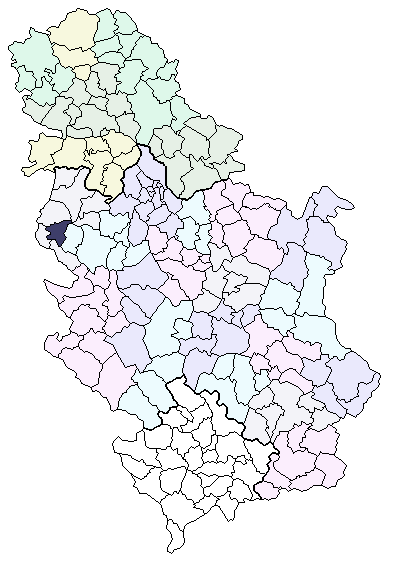
Location of the Krupanj municipality in Serbia

Bela Crkva (Бела Црква, pronounced [bɛ̂ːlaː tsr̩̂ːkv̞a]) is a village in Serbia. It is situated in the Krupanj municipality, in the Mačva District of Central Serbia. The village had a Serb ethnic majority and a population of 755 in 2002.

On 7 July 1941, two Serbian police officers were ambushed and killed by Yugoslav partisans in Bela Crkva; this was one of the pivotal moments in the outbreak of the 1941 Serbian uprising.

== Historical population ==
- 1948: 1,053 (mainly native Serbs)
- 1953: 1,080
- 1961: 998
- 1971: 926
- 1981: 888
- 1991: 866
- 2002: 755

== See also ==
- List of places in Serbia
