= Dinara Division =

- Chetnik flag; inscription reads: "For king and fatherland; freedom or death"
- Active: 1942–1945
- Allegiance: (Kingdom of Yugoslavia) Yugoslav government-in-exile (1942–44); Italy (1942–43); Germany (1943–45); Government of National Salvation (1942–44)
- Type: Infantry
- Role: Anti-partisan operations
- Size: 3,000–6,500
- Part of: Chetniks; Anti-Communist Volunteer Militia (1942–43)
- Engagements: World War II in Yugoslavia: Operation Alfa; Operation Weiss; Operation Citen; Operation Rösselsprung (1944); Battle of Knin; Retreat of collaborators with the Germans (1944–1945); Serb collaborationist operations in the Slovene Littoral (1944–1945); Operation Ribecal (1945); Operation Winterende; Race for Trieste; Final operations for the liberation of Yugoslavia in 1945

Commanders
- Notable commanders: Momčilo Đujić

The Dinara Division (Serbian: Динарска дивизија / Dinarska divizija) was an irregular Chetnik formation that existed during the World War II Axis occupation of Yugoslavia that largely operated as auxiliaries of the occupying forces and fought the Yugoslav Partisans. Organized in 1942 with assistance from Ilija Trifunović-Birčanin and headed by Momčilo Đujić, the division incorporated commanders in Bosnia and Herzegovina (Bosanska Krajina), northern Dalmatia, and the Lika region. The division was under the control of supreme Chetnik commander Draža Mihailović and received aid from Dimitrije Ljotić, leader of the Serbian Volunteer Corps, and Milan Nedić, head of the Serbian puppet Government of National Salvation.

In late 1944 the division began withdrawing towards Slovenia. Afterwards, it joined Dobroslav Jevđević's Chetniks, Ljotić's Serbian Volunteer Corps, and the remnants of Nedić's Serbian Shock Corps in forming a single unit that was under the command of Odilo Globocnik of the Higher SS and Police Leader in the Adriatic Littoral. In May 1945 Đujić surrendered the division to Allied forces, who took its members to southern Italy, from where they were taken to displaced persons camps in Germany and then dispersed. Đujić emigrated to the United States in 1949. Many members of the Dinara division are believed to have followed him there, while others emigrated to Canada. Đujić lived in the United States until his death in September 1999.

== Background ==
On 6 April 1941, Axis forces invaded the Kingdom of Yugoslavia. Poorly equipped and poorly trained, the Royal Yugoslav Army was quickly defeated. After the invasion, the country was dismembered. The extreme Croat nationalist and fascist Ante Pavelić, who had been in exile in Benito Mussolini's Italy, was then appointed Poglavnik (leader) of an Ustaše-led Croatian state – the Independent State of Croatia (often called the NDH, from the Croatian: Nezavisna Država Hrvatska). The NDH combined almost all of modern-day Croatia, all of modern-day Bosnia and Herzegovina and parts of modern-day Serbia into an "Italian-German quasi-protectorate." NDH authorities, led by the Ustaše militia, subsequently implemented genocidal policies against the Serb, Jewish and Romani population living within the borders of the new state. Serbs in particular were targeted for incarcerations, massacres, forced emigration, and murder. As a result, two resistance movements emerged – the royalist and Serb Chetniks, led by Colonel Draža Mihailović, and the multi-ethnic, Communist Yugoslav Partisans, led by Josip Broz Tito. Momčilo Đujić, a Serbian Orthodox priest, appointed himself vojvoda (commander) of Chetnik forces in northern Dalmatia. Chetnik movement in Croatia was developed among the Serbs of the Kninska Krajina, central Dalmatia and southern Lika region. These Chetnik groups were formed during separation of the Greater Serbian and pro-Chetnik elements which arose from insurgent Serb groups whose actions were against the military and civilian authorities of the NDH and Ustasha repressive measures against the Serb population. Some of the Greater Serbian and the pro-Chetnik groups were under protection of the Italian occupation army and they gradually became part of their service. After the Zagreb agreement between the NDH authorities and the Italian military authorities from the middle of 1942 these Chetnik groups became part of voluntary anti-communist militias (Milizia volontaria anticomunista) where they were properly supplied with weapons, food, and in time of combat activities against the Partisans paid with money and war loot. During March–April 1942 all these Chetnik groups from the Kninska Krajina, northern Dalmatia and southern Lika area will be united to the Dinara Chetniks Division and placed under the command of the West Bosnian, Lika-Dalmatian and Herzegovinian military Chetnik detachments where they were even better connected to the movement of Draža Mihailović.

== Formation and objectives ==
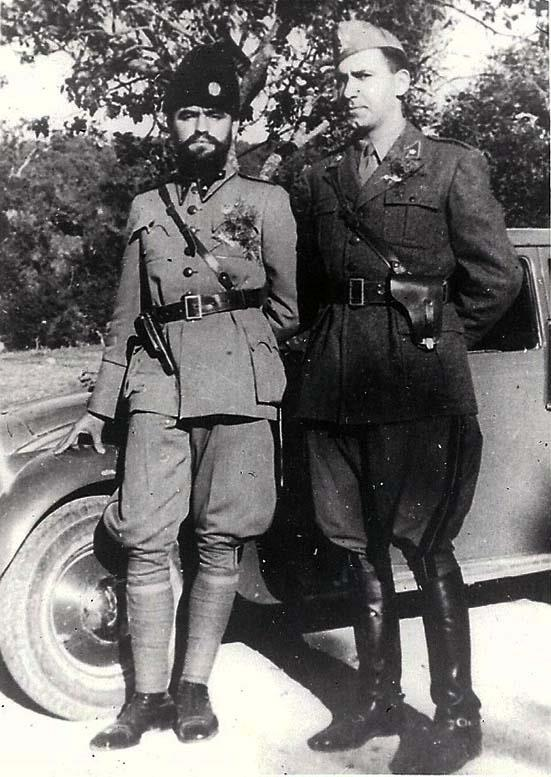
Momčilo Đujić, commander of the Dinara Division (left), with an Italian officer

The division was formed in early January 1942 after Đujić was contacted by Mihailović via a courier. Ilija Trifunović-Birčanin played a central role in organizing the units of Chetnik leaders in western Bosnia, Lika, and northern Dalmatia into the Dinara Division and dispatched former Royal Yugoslav Army officers to help. Đujić was designated the commander of the division and its goal was for the "establishment of a Serb national state" in which "an exclusively Orthodox population is to live". According to Đujić: "We were under Draža's command, but we received news and supplies for our struggle from [Dimitrije] Ljotić and [Milan] Nedić. [...] Nedić's couriers reached me in Dinara and mine reached him in Belgrade. He sent me military uniforms for the guardists of the Dinara Chetnik Division; he sent me ten million dinars to obtain for the fighters whatever was needed and whatever could be obtained."

In March 1942 the division prepared a programmatic statement that concerned the "specific conditions of Bosnia and Herzegovina, northern Dalmatia, and southwestern Croatia (Lika)." The statement was accepted by commanders of these areas during a conference at Strmica near Knin a month later. The statement echoed the tone of Mihailović's instructions issued in December 1941 to Chetnik commanders Major Đorđije Lašić and Captain Pavle Đurišić in pursuing a Greater Serbia that was to be inhabited solely by Serbs, the establishment of a corridor through the linkage of the territories Herzegovina, northern Dalmatia, Bosnia, and Lika to Slovenia; the mobilization of all Serb nationalists for the ethnic cleansing of other nationalities that existed in Herzegovina, Dalmatia, Bosnia, and Lika. Most historians who have considered the question regard the Chetnik crimes against Muslims and Croats during this period as constituting genocide. It also elaborated on the division's wartime strategy: "collaboration with the Italians on a live-and-let-live principle, determined struggle against Ustaša formations and the Domobrans, as well as against the Partisans; it is task of the Chetnik movement to prevent increasing number of Croats and Muslims who join the Partisan movement and the main focus must be towards "national Croats", though later they can be eliminated; and the formation of separate Croatian Chetnik units for pro-Yugoslav, anti-Partisan Croats." While towards Muslims "should be patient, not to kill them and plunder ie undertake such methods that Muslims really gain belief that military-Chetnik detachments are their friends", in this regard it is concluded "any premature action against the Muslim population would strengthen the Partisans because they have to sit at their houses so that we destroy them in their homes" In the area of the Sassari division according to a report of the Italian 18. Army Corps from 11 August 1942 exist nine Chetnik detachments with total of 12,440 persons under command of Momčilo Đujić, however according to same record only about 2600 persons were armed. While command of 18. Army Corps in mid-September 1942 talks about 4269 people armed with 4197 rifles, 35 light machine guns and 7 machine guns. In order to strengthen the Chetnik positions in the area of the Kninska Krajina and southern Lika at the end of 1942 were transferred about 3,200 Herzegovinian and east Bosnian Chetniks, among whom was and the Zlatibor Chetnik detachment from Serbia which remained there until March 1943. In the late summer of 1944 Dinara Division has about 6500 of Chetniks.

== Decline and retreat to the Adriatic Littoral ==
During early February 1943, as the Partisans began to prevail over the Chetniks as part of Operation Weiss, Đujić and Petar Baćović attempted to mount a counteroffensive around Bosansko Grahovo in western Bosnia preliminary to re-capturing Drvar. This was opposed by the Germans and made no headway. By early August, the Dinara Division was "poorly formed, badly armed and disciplined", lacked accurate rolls of its members, and consisted of no more than 3,000 effectives. Lieutenant Colonel Mladen Žujović, one of Mihailović's few remaining delegates in the area, concluded that the division was "a pure figment of the imagination."

Đujić's and Baćović's forces were active in the Dalmatian Hinterland in January 1943. 33 people were executed in the Imotski district, and 103 in the area of Vrlika and its surroundings. Between 60 and 80 Croats were killed in the village of Maovice on 26 January 1943; victims were mostly slaughtered with knives or thrown alive into burning buildings. On 25 March 1943, Chetnik units of the Dinara Division were ordered to begin "cleansing [the area] of Croats and Muslims" and to create "one national corridor along the Dinara mountain for the connection of Herzegovina with Northern Dalmatia and Lika." Between 26–30 March 1944, Dinara Chetniks, alongside the 7th SS Division "Prinz Eugen" and the Ustaše 369th Infantry Division (under German command), massacred at least 1,525 Croat civilians during anti-Partisan reprisals across several villages in the Dalmatian Hinterland. In April 1943, Đujić's Chetniks set up a prison and execution site in the village of Kosovo (today Biskupija), near Knin. Thousands of local civilians, (both Croats and even Serb Anti-Fascists) including women and children, as well as captured Partisans, were held and mistreated at this prison, while hundreds of prisoners (as many as over 1,000) were tortured and killed at an execution site near a ravine close to the camp. On 30 April 1944, Chetniks, in collaboration with the SS Police Regiment Bozen and local Italian Fascists, massacred 269 Croat civilians in village of Lipa, near Rijeka, of whom 121 were children between seven months and 15 years old. The Dinara Division was in December 1944 retreating to Slovenia through the Croatian Littoral. On their way, they looted villages, killed 33 civilians, and burnt the village of Bribir to the ground.

On 21 December 1944, after Đujić requested a written guarantee from Ante Pavelić to afford him and his forces refuge in German-occupied Slovenia, Pavelić ordered the military forces of the Independent State of Croatia to give Đujić's division free passage. However, Đujić went through an alternate route towards the Istrian peninsula, as the routes offered by Pavelić were not secure from Partisan attacks, and killed the Croatian population along the way. When Đujić reached Slovenia, his forces joined Dobroslav Jevđević's Chetniks, Dimitrije Ljotić's Serbian Volunteer Corps, and the remnants of Milan Nedić's Serbian Shock Corps in forming a single unit that was under the command of Odilo Globocnik of the Higher SS and Police Leader in the Adriatic Littoral.

== Aftermath ==
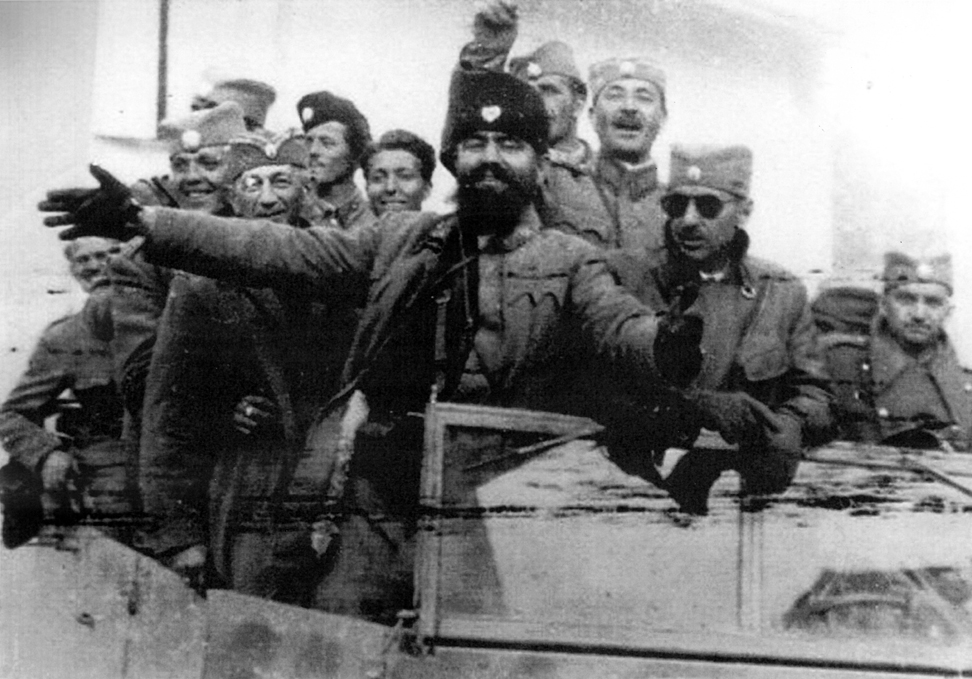
Đujić and members of the Dinara Division in Trieste, 1945

In May 1945, Đujić surrendered the Dinara division to Allied forces. Its members were then taken to southern Italy. From there, they were taken to displaced persons camps in Germany and then dispersed. In 1947, Đujić was tried and convicted of war crimes in absentia by Yugoslavia's communist government. He was found guilty of mass murder, torture, rape, robbery, and forcible confinement, as well as collaborating with the German and Italians. He was accused of being responsible for the deaths of 1,500 people over the course of the war. After staying in Paris from 1947 to 1949, Đujić emigrated to the United States, where many members of the Dinara division are believed to have followed him. Other members of the division emigrated to Canada and settled there. Đujić lived in the United States until his death in San Diego, California in September 1999.
