= Krsmanović =

Krsmanović (Serbian: Крсмановић) is a surname. Notable people with the surname include:

- Branko Krsmanović (1915–1941), Yugoslav Partisans member
- Nataša Krsmanović (born 1985), Serbian volleyball player
- Petar Krsmanović (born 1990), Serbian volleyball player
- Tijana Krsmanović (born 1994), rhythmic gymnast
- Vladislav Krsmanovic (born 1964), Serbian mayor
