= Operation Kosmaj =

Operation during Uprising in Serbia

- Part of Uprising in Serbia (1941)
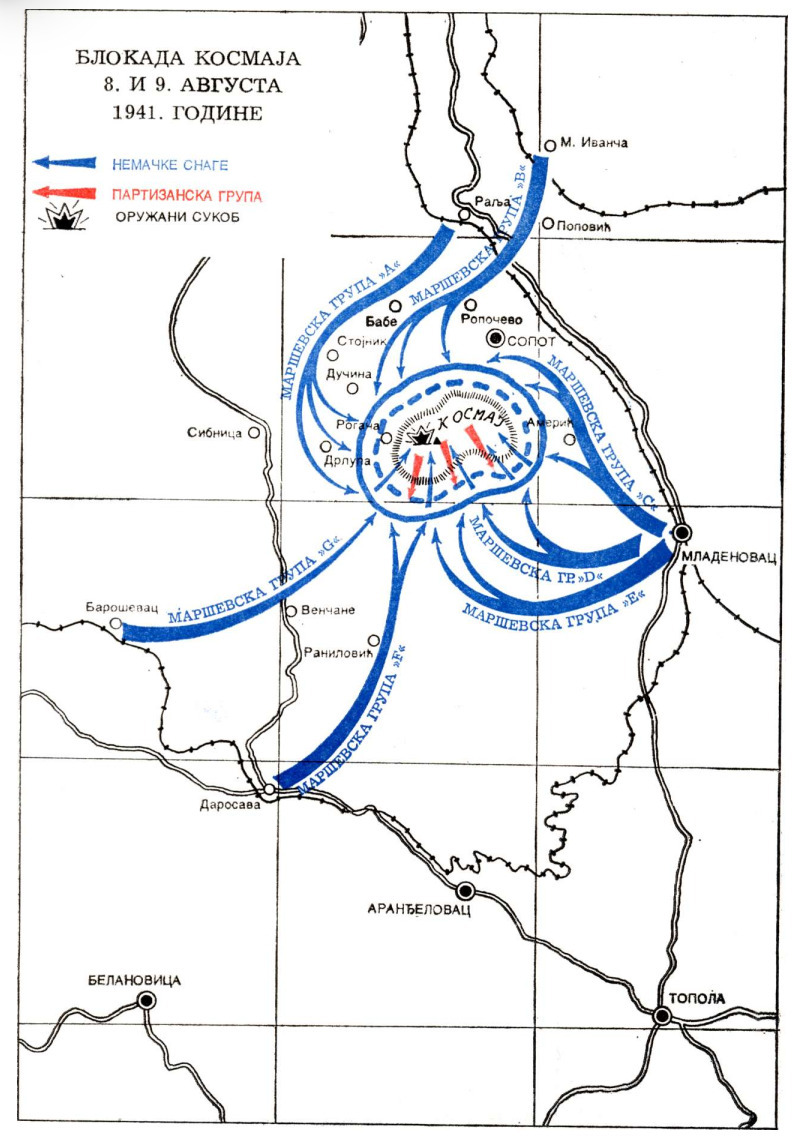
- Blockade of Kosmaj, 8–9 August 1941
Date	7–9 August 1941 (2 days)
Location	Kosmaj near Belgrade
Result	German and Serbian victory

Belligerents
(Nazi Germany) Germany (Government of National Salvation) Serbian gendarmerie	Yugoslav Partisans

Commanders and leaders
(Government of National Salvation) Milan Aćimović	(Yugoslav Partisans) Koča Popović (Yugoslav Partisans) Rade Jovanović (Yugoslav Partisans) Branko Krsmanović †

Strength
(Nazi Germany) (Government of National Salvation) 3,000 to 8,000 soldiers and officers	(Yugoslav Partisans) Around 90

Casualties and losses
1 killed and 4 wounded (German claim) 10 killed and wounded including one German officer (Yugoslav partisan claim)	18 killed and 13 captured (German claim) 13 killed and one captured (Dragoslav Dimitrijević claim)
- (Yugoslav Partisans) 5 executed after operation

Operation Kosmaj, also known as the Blockade of Kosmaj or Operation Bader, was the first anti-guerrilla operation conducted by the Wehrmacht in occupied Serbia, aimed against the Yugoslav Partisans on Kosmaj mountain, near Belgrade.

It took place from 7 to 9 August 1941, at the very beginning of the uprising in Serbia. The total number of German and Serbian troops engaged in the operation is roughly estimated between 3,000 and 8,000 soldiers and officers, supported by tanks. In contrast, the Kosmaj Partisan Detachment at the end of July had around 94 fighters.

== Background ==
For the security of the railway lines in Serbia, armed Serbian gendarmerie were used. Increased insurgent activity, especially since 25 July 1941, when viaducts 30 km south and southeast of Belgrade were destroyed, created the need to strengthen protection of railway facilities on the Belgrade—Palanka—Niš and Belgrade—Osipaonica lines.

— Monthly report of the Commander of Serbia to the Commander of the Armed Forces in the Southeast, 5 August 1941

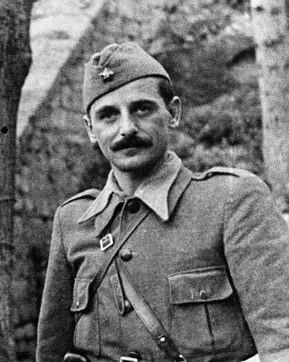
Koča Popović, commander of the Kosmaj partisans.

The Kosmaj-Posavina Detachment, formed on Kosmaj mountain on 1–2 July 1941, was one of the first Partisan detachments in occupied Yugoslavia. Upon its founding, Koča Popović, a Spanish Civil War fighter and former officer of the Royal Yugoslav Army, was appointed commander, with Radovan Jovanović as his deputy. In the early days of the uprising in Serbia, from early July to early August, the Supreme Headquarters of the Partisans in Serbia was for a time located on Kosmaj. On 25 July, the Kosmaj detachment carried out simultaneous sabotages on viaducts near Beli Potok and Ralja. The bridge at Beli Potok was blown up, while the bridge at Ralja was heavily damaged. Both actions caused interruptions of rail traffic. In early August, the Kosmaj partisans intensified attacks on municipal offices and gendarmerie stations, held assemblies in villages, and called the people to uprising.

On 3 August, the Partisans entered the village of Stojnik, disarmed the gendarmerie station, and held a rally with many peasants. During the rally, two trucks full of German soldiers and gendarmes, accompanied by Belgrade’s chief of police, Dragomir Jovanović, arrived. A brief skirmish ensued, after which the partisans withdrew. The aim of this German-gendarme unit with Jovanović was reconnaissance and intelligence gathering in preparation for the encirclement of Kosmaj, which followed days later.

== Operational plan ==
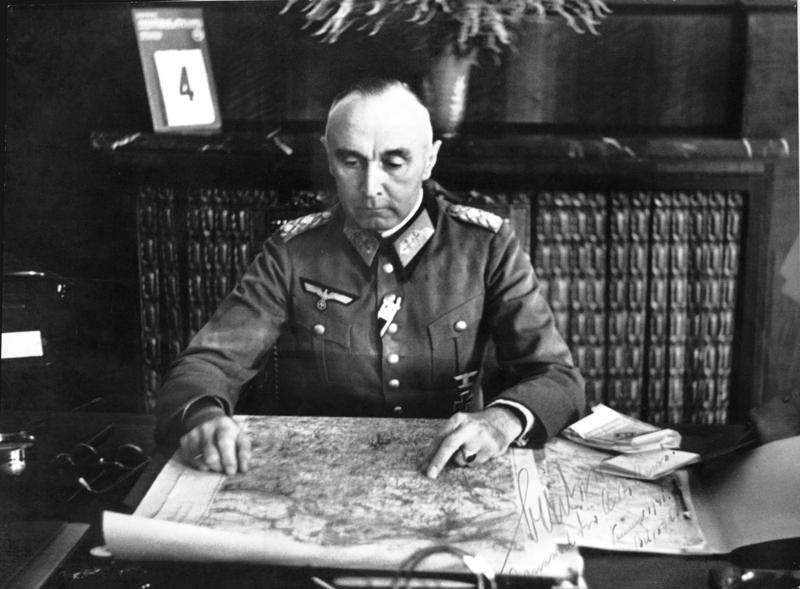
General Paul Bader studying a map, summer 1941 in occupied Serbia.

By late July and early August, German intelligence reported that “on Mount Kosmaj, near Belgrade, there are communists”, that “their main camp with a radio station is near Tresije Monastery, by the Hladna Voda spring”, that “around twenty communists are there with automatic weapons and infernal machines”, that “they intend to recruit young men, students, sober peasants, to plant explosives on railways, bridges and tunnels”, that “they plan to obstruct the transport of wheat to Germany” and that “they will move their camp to Lupoglav, a Kosmaj ridge”. Based on this, General of Artillery Paul Bader decided to encircle Kosmaj with strong forces and destroy the partisans before their activity grew further.

On 5 August 1941, in Belgrade, General Bader held a meeting with commanders of the 704th, 714th and 717th divisions. A plan was drawn up for encirclement and destruction of the partisans on Kosmaj, assigning seven battalions, two batteries, twenty-five tanks, and additional units. The commander of this operation, code-named "Bader", was General-Major Friedrich Stahl, commander of the 714th Division. The operation also involved Milan Aćimović, head of the quisling Commissarial Administration, with several hundred gendarmes assisting the Germans.

== Course of the operation ==
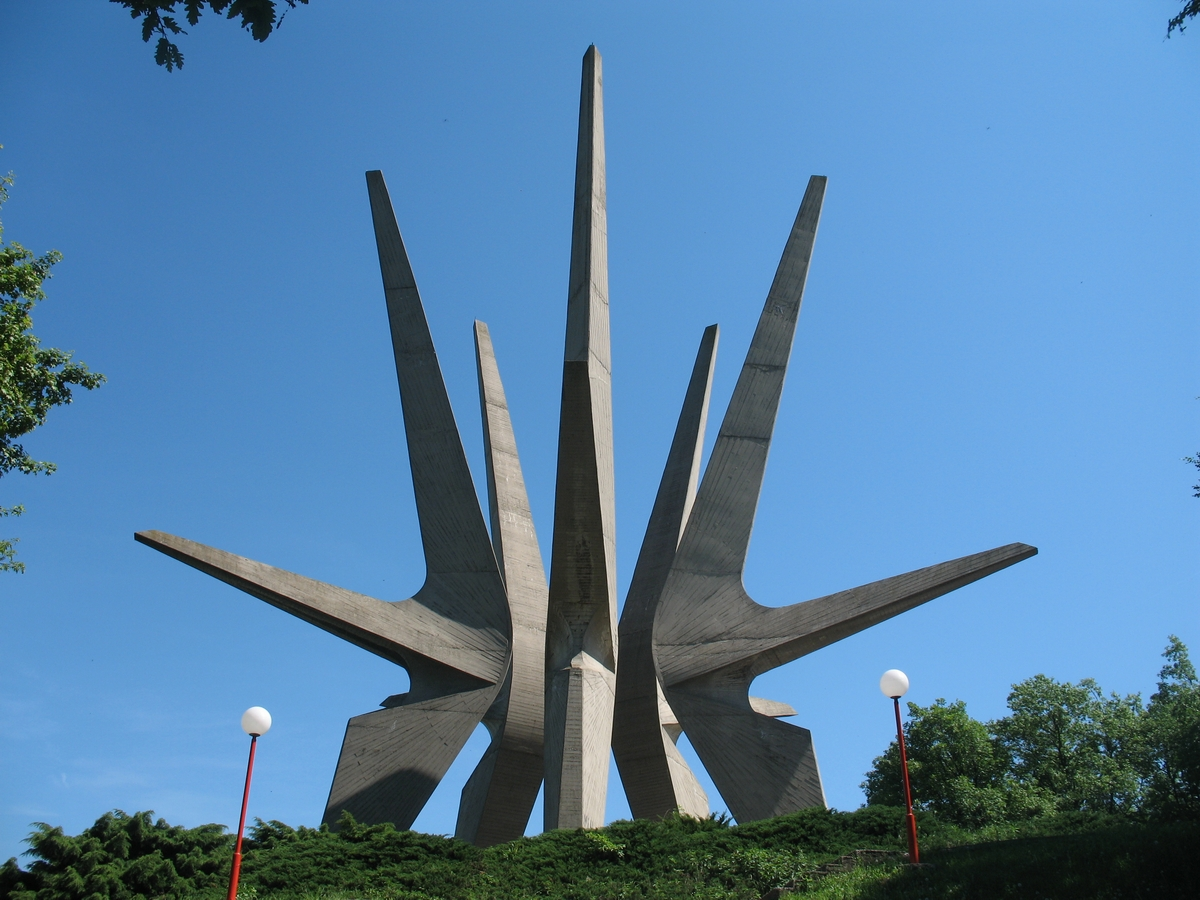
Monument to the fallen fighters of the Kosmaj Partisan Detachment on Kosmaj peak.

On 7 August 1941, the Germans launched their major operation against the Kosmaj partisans. Units of the 734th and 724th Infantry Regiments and 654th Artillery Battalion of the 704th Division, units of the 749th Infantry Regiment and 670th Artillery Battalion of the 717th Division, and units of the 721st and 741st Infantry Regiments and 661st Artillery Battalion of the 714th Division were organized into seven marching columns approaching Kosmaj.

- Column "A": 1st Battalion, 734th Regiment, 1st Battery, 661st Artillery Battalion, one pioneer platoon, advanced from Ralja station, west of Kosmaj;
- Column "V": 2nd Battalion, 741st Regiment, and pioneers, moved via Mala Ivanča–Ropočevo–northeast Kosmaj;
- Column "S": 2nd Battalion, 749th Regiment, pioneers, a tank platoon, moved via Mladenovac–Amerić–southeast Kosmaj;
- Column "B": 3rd Battalion, 749th Regiment, 1st Battery, 670th Artillery Battalion, moved via Mladenovac–southern Kosmaj;
- Column "E": 2nd Battalion, 721st Regiment, moved via Mladenovac–Crkvine–Kosmaj;
- Columns "R" and "S": advanced from Darosava–Ranilović–Kosmaj and Baroševac–Venčane–Kosmaj.

On 8 August, the Germans completed the encirclement of Kosmaj. At first the true aim was concealed, the operation appearing as horse requisition from peasants, which partisans even tried to prevent. During the night of 8/9 August, near Velika Ivanča, a Partisan squad ran into a German ambush and was wiped out.

On 9 August in the morning, German troops began combing the mountain. Deployed in smaller groups and sometimes in skirmish lines, they tightened the ring and reached the peaks before noon. The Mladenovac Partisan company, numbering 27, was trapped. On Middle Kosmaj, where today stands the memorial, about ten partisans of the 2nd Mladenovac Company under Milan Milisavljević Žuća made their last stand and were all killed. In the unequal struggle, 13 partisans were killed, the rest broke out of encirclement.

Among the dead was Branko Krsmanović, a Spanish Civil War fighter and member of the Supreme Staff of Serbia.

== Casualties ==
Total killed: 18 bandits, captured: 13 bandits; seized: 1 light machine gun, 6 rifles, 3 pistols, 1 bayonet, hand grenades and ammunition. Own losses: 1 dead (8th Company, 749th Regiment); wounded: 4 (1 from 724th Regiment, 3 from 721st Regiment).

— Final report of the 714th Division Staff on Operation Kosmaj

According to German reports, 18 partisans were killed and 13 captured. Dragoslav Dimitrijević states that about 13 partisans were killed and only one captured. He estimates German losses at around ten killed and wounded. According to one partisan’s account, a German officer was also killed.

Despite thorough encirclement, some partisans managed to escape.

== Aftermath ==
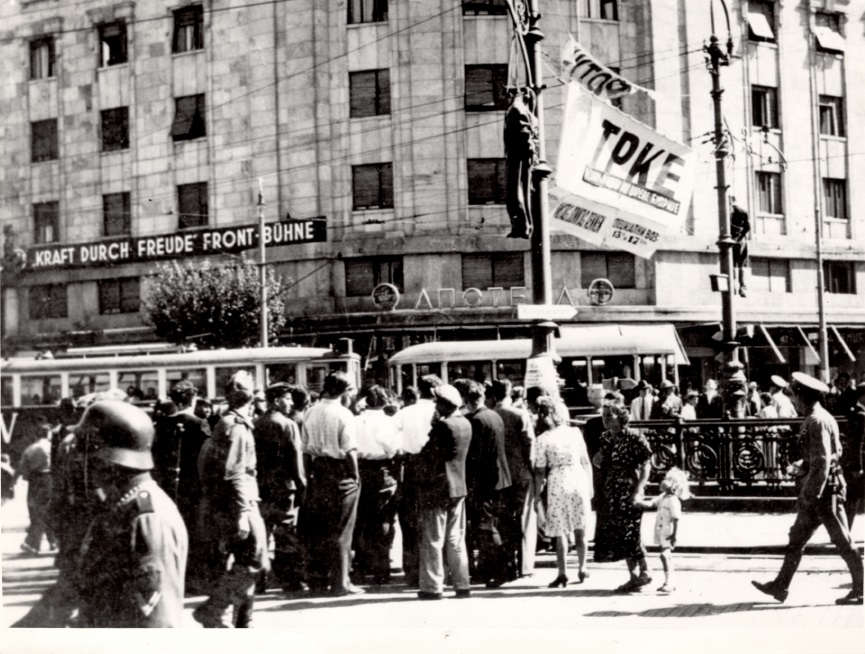
Terazije public hangings in Belgrade, 17 August 1941.

The corpses of most fallen partisans were, on German orders, taken by peasants to Sopot, where they were displayed for several days for identification and intimidation. Later they were buried in a common grave at Sopot cemetery.

On 13 August, the Appeal to the Serbian nation was published, condemning the uprising and calling the population to fight communists and obey the occupiers.

On 17 August, five captured communists were hanged at Terazije, central Belgrade. Two of them were captured partisans, peasants from the Kosmaj region. The hangings aimed to terrorize the city population and reassure collaborators, as assassinations and sabotage increased.

The organizer of the executions was SS-Major Karl Kraus, head of Belgrade Gestapo, assisted by Dragi Jovanović, Belgrade police chief. The hanging was approved by General Heinrich Danckelmann, German commander in Serbia, who stressed that “the victims of reprisal must be clearly identified as communists, to avoid stirring national sentiments”.

At dawn the prisoners were shot in Gestapo headquarters, then their bodies were hung on electric poles at Terazije. Sunday, 17 August 1941, shocked Belgrade residents with the sight of five ragged, disfigured corpses hanging beneath banners for horse races, one carrying the slogan “Kraft durch Freude” (“Strength through Joy”). Despite these measures, the uprising continued to grow. The Kosmaj detachment was not destroyed, and by early September had increased to about 250 fighters.

== See also ==
- Uprising in Serbia (1941)
