= Serb collaborationist operations in the Slovene Littoral (1944–1945) =

- Part of World War II in Yugoslavia
Date	Mid-November 1944 – Spring 1945
Location	Slovene Littoral, Operational Zone of the Adriatic Littoral (OZAK)
Result	Serb collaborationist victory: Partisans are forced to withdraw from some areas
Territorial changes	Serbian Volunteer Corps and Serbian State Guard temporarily captured several settlements and partisan strongholds

Belligerents
Chetniks; (Government of National Salvation) Serbian Volunteer Corps; Serbian State Guard; Supported by: Slovene Home Guard; Germany; (Schutzstaffel) 14th Waffen Grenadier Division of the SS (1st Galician); Security Battalions; Russian Liberation Army; (Russia) Russian Protective Corps	Yugoslavia; Yugoslav Partisans; Slovene Partisans; Italian Resistance

Commanders and leaders
Government of National Salvation: Dimitrije Ljotić; Marisav Petrović; Ratko Parežanin; Čeda Živanović; Chetniks: Momčilo Đujić; Dobroslav Jevđević; Ivan Prezelj	(Yugoslav Partisans) Josip Broz Tito

Units involved
(Government of National Salvation) Serbian Volunteer Corps; Several regiments and battalions; Serbian State Guard; Dinara Division; Slovene Chetniks; Slovene Home Guard; Russian Liberation Army; (Russia) Russian Protective Corps; (Schutzstaffel) 14th Waffen Grenadier Division of the SS (1st Galician); Security Battalions	(Yugoslav Partisans) Several divisions

Strength
10,000–15,000; 35,000 (According to pro–Ljotić sources) c. 200 soldiers of "Croatian army"	Unknown

Casualties and losses
Unknown	Heavy

Serb collaborationist operations in the Slovene Littoral involved the Serbian Volunteer Corps, the Serbian State Guard and Chetniks fighting against the Partisans from late 1944 to spring 1945. These actions included attacks on areas controlled by the Partisans, anti-Partisan offensives and operations, as well as participation in German anti-Partisan operations. Serbian formations had support from the Slovene Home Guard, SS units, Russian Liberation Army and 14th Waffen Grenadier Division of the SS (1st Galician)

== Background and arrival of Serbian formations ==
After the capitulation of Italy in 1943, the Operational Zone of the Adriatic Littoral (OZAK) was established in the second half of September of that year. Most of this zone had been under Italian control since 1918, but following the capitulation it fell under German control, while another part of the zone had previously been under Yugoslav control until 1941.

The first units of the Serbian Volunteer Corps arrived in this zone on 3 November 1944, shortly after the arrival of Chetnik forces under Dobroslav Jevđević that came in November. By the end of November, a total of around 5,000 SDK personnel had been deployed to the area. The transfer of the SDK to the OZAK zone was approved by German authorities of the Command of the Southeast on 19 October 1944. The Volunteer Corps was placed under the command of Odilo Globocnik and the SS.

== Deployment of SDK units in the Slovene Littoral ==
SDK forces were deployed throughout the Adriatic Littoral zone. The SDK command was initially headquartered in Ilirska Bistrica; later, together with the 1st Regiment, it was relocated to Postojna, while other SDK units were stationed in nearby villages.

The regiments and battalions of the SDK were assigned the following tasks:

- The 1st Regiment was responsible for securing the Prestranek–Postojna railway line.
- The 2nd Regiment secured the area from Šent Peter to Ilirska Bistrica. Within this zone, SDK battalions and smaller detachments were stationed in small towns and villages (such as Trnje, Klenik, etc.), where they engaged in minor clashes with partisan forces.

== Operations ==
The arrival of Serbian formations in western Slovenia posed difficulties for the partisans who had already been under pressure from German forces since the autumn of 1943. However, the operations carried out by Serbian formations were of lower intensity compared to those conducted in German occupied Serbia. Serbian formations began their operations and actions in mid-November, conducting minor patrols and actions near partisan strongholds. The 2nd Regiment of the Serbian Volunteer Corps was engaged in anti-partisan operations on 16 November 1944, southwest of Šent Peter on Kras, together with SS police units. The operation resulted in partisan withdrawal followed by a pursuit. On 18 December 1944, the SDK independently succeeded in capturing a partisan stronghold in Col. The actions of the Serbian State Guard also created problems for the Slovenian partisans, members of the SDS were well-trained and well-armed, and due to their operations the 17th Slovenian National Liberation Brigade was forced to withdraw. The SDK was engaged alongside the Russian Liberation Army (ROA), 14th Waffen Grenadier Division of the SS (1st Galician), Slovene Home Guard, and German forces in operations and offensives against the partisans, such as Operation Rübezahl–3, as well as smaller actions in the Col area. Other operations in which SDK battalions were involved include Operation Frühlingsanfang and Operation Winterende, one of the last successful Axis operations in Slovenia aimed at clearing partisan units in the Littoral.

== Sources ==
- Stefanio di Giusto (2005). Operationszone Adriatisches Künstenland: Udine, Gorizia, Trieste, Pola, Fiume e Lubiana durante l'occupazione tedesca, 1943- 1945.
- Bojan Dimitrijević. ВОЈСКА НЕДИЋЕВЕ СРБИЈЕ 1941 ДО 1945.
- Jozo Tomasevich (2001). War and Revolution in Yugoslavia, 1941-1945: Occupation and Collaboration. ISBN 978-0804736152.
