= Aćimović offensive =

Military operation

Aćimović Offensive
- Part of World War II in Yugoslavia
Date	10 July – 20 September 1942
Location	Southeastern Serbia
Result	Serbian collaborationist victory: Heavy partisan casualties; Several partisan groups are weakened or destroyed; Destruction of Svrljig-Nišava detachment; Partisan withdrawal

Belligerents
Serbian State Guard; Chetniks of Kosta Pećanac (Serbia) Serbian Volunteer Corps	Yugoslav Partisans

Commanders and leaders
(Serbia) Milan Nedić (Serbia) Milan Aćimović; Ljudevit Pogačar; Velimir Popović (Chetniks) Kosta Pećanac	(Yugoslav Partisans) Slobodan Žilnik (Yugoslav Partisans) Nikodije Stojanović Tatko †

Units involved
Serbian State Guard: Eastern Detachment (SDS); Western Detachment (SDS)	Yugoslav Partisans: Ozren Detachment; Jastrebac Detachment; Svrljig-Nišava Detachment

Strength
(Serbia) (Chetniks) 10,000 troops	Unknown

Casualties and losses
Low	(Yugoslav Partisans) Heavy (Yugoslav Partisans) 2,000–2,600 captured and executed

The Aćimović Offensive, also known as the Aćimović Pursuit, was a military operation of the Serbian State Guard and Chetniks of Kosta Pećanac against partisan detachments in Southeastern Serbia. It was named after Milan Aćimović, the Minister of Internal Affairs in the collaborationist government of Milan Nedić, who was entrusted with preparing the offensive. Occupation troops (German and Bulgarian) did not directly participate in the operation; it was entirely entrusted to collaborationist units.

This was one of the most organized and largest offensives against partisan forces in Šumadija, Eastern and Southern Serbia, involving about 10,000 collaborationist troops (Pećanac's Chetniks, the Serbian State Guard, and the Serbian Volunteer Corps).

In the third stage of the offensive, which began on 10 August 1942, the Rasina, Toplica and Jablanica detachments were targeted, followed by the Leskovac and Babič detachments. Around 20 September 1942 the Aćimović Offensive ended. Its results were mixed: many fighters of the Babič Detachment perished, but the unit nevertheless survived.

== Background ==
At the beginning of 1942, three large and well-armed partisan detachments operated in the Niš district: the Ozren, Jastrebac and Svrljig-Nišava detachments, numbering about 400 fighters in total. From their formation until the end of June 1942, the enemy command had launched several offensives to destroy them, but without success.

== Offensive ==
After an unsuccessful Bulgarian offensive in June 1942, the Germans demanded that General Milan Nedić eliminate the partisan detachments in Southeastern Serbia. The direct leadership of this new military campaign was entrusted to Milan Aćimović, Minister of Internal Affairs in the Government of National Salvation, and therefore the operation is named the "Aćimović Offensive".

About 2,000 men of the Serbian State Guard (SDS) and over 1,200 Chetniks of Kosta Pećanac took part, while another 5,000 assisted the action through constant patrolling and clearing the terrain. The SDS forces were organized into two detachments: the Eastern Detachment, commanded by Lt. Colonel Filip Dimitrijević and Lt. Colonel Ljudevit Pogačar, and the Western Detachment, commanded by Major Velimir Popović. The offensive began on 10 July 1942 with an attack by the Eastern Detachment against the Ozren Detachment. To avoid a frontal clash with the much larger enemy, the partisans split into four groups: the Aleksinac, Sokobanja, Ražanj and Niš groups. The Niš group was completely destroyed, the Aleksinac group partially, while the Ražanj and Sokobanja groups concealed themselves on Rtanj and Bukovik mountains and avoided destruction. The detachment lost 24 fighters in these battles.

== Battles of Vitanovac and Miranovačka Kula ==
Battles of Vitanovac and Miranovačka Kula
- Part of World War II in Yugoslavia
Date	22–26 July 1942
Location	Vitanovac and Miranovačka Kula
Result	Serbian State Guard victory

Belligerents
(Serbia) Serbian State Guard; Chetniks detachments	(Yugoslav Partisans) Yugoslav partisans

On 22 July 1942, the SDS units under Pogačar and the Bela Palanka Chetnik Detachment surrounded the Svrljig Mountains, where the Svrljig-Nišava Detachment was located. The heaviest battles took place on 27 July near the village of Vitanovac and Miranovačka Kula, when, after breaking through seven successive encirclements, the detachment ceased to exist as an organized unit.

== Jastrebac offensive ==
Jastrebac offensive
- Part of World War II in Yugoslavia
Date	10 August 1942
Location	Jastrebac
Result	Partisan withdrawal

Belligerents
(Serbia) Serbian State Guard	(Yugoslav Partisans) Yugoslav partisans

Commanders and leaders
(Serbia) Velimir Popović	(Yugoslav Partisans) Nikodije Stojanović Tatko †

The Western Detachment under Major Popović began its action against the Jastrebac Detachment on 10 August in the evening. Informed of the coming offensive, the staff of the Jastrebac Detachment withdrew the Velikojastrebac and Malojastrebac companies outside the enemy ring and preserved the main force. In a dugout on Mali Jastrebac, however, eight partisans, including Nikodije Stojanović Tatko, a former political commissar of the detachment and a proclaimed People's Hero, were killed, while three others were captured and later executed by the Germans at Bubanj.

Since the enemy failed to destroy the partisan detachments in that area, mass physical terror against the civilian population followed. As Aćimović himself proclaimed, the goal of the action was not only military, but also to uproot the People's Liberation Movement in this part of Serbia. Partisan houses were burned, almost all huts in the Svrljig Mountains, on Devič and on Ozren were destroyed, villages were plundered, and the largest wave of arrests so far was undertaken. Over 400 people were arrested in the Ozren area, over 600 in Svrljig, over 400 in Toplica – more than 2,000 in Southeastern Serbia in total, most of them partisans or their collaborators.

== Aftermath ==
The Aćimović Offensive brought great hardships to the partisan detachments and to the population of Southern Serbia.
