= Operation Winterende =

Last axis offensive against the Partisans in the Adriatic Littoral

- Part of World War II in Yugoslavia and World War II in the Slovene Lands
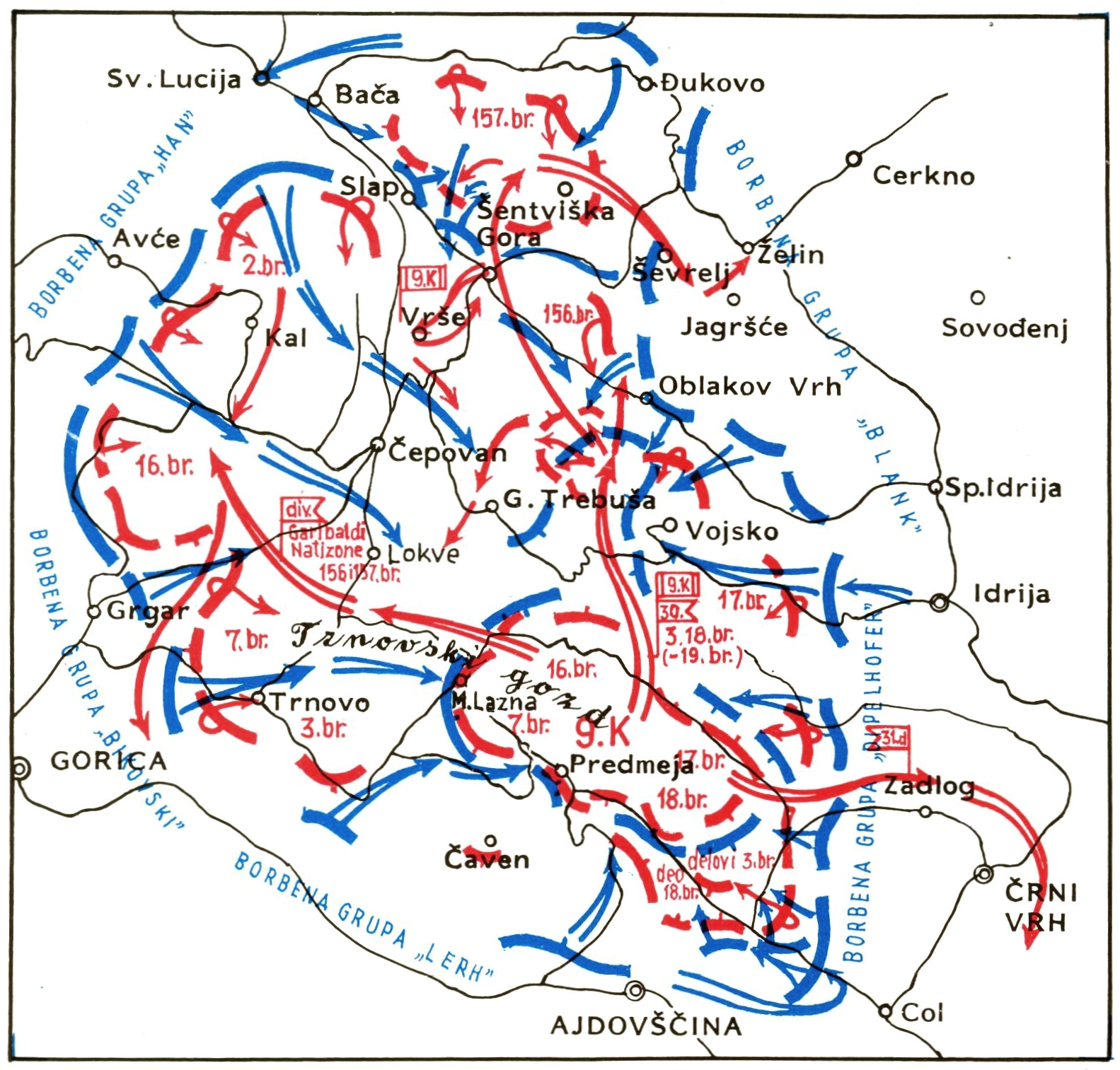
- Map of operation
Date	10 March – 6 April 1945
Location	Operational Zone of the Adriatic Littoral
Result	Axis victory; Partisans are forced to withdraw

Belligerents
(Nazi Germany) Germany; (Government of National Salvation) Serbian Volunteer Corps; Serbian State Guard; Slovene Home Guard; (Hellenic State (1941–1944)) Security Battalions; Chetniks; Italian Social Republic; Russian Liberation Army	(Yugoslav Partisans) Yugoslav partisans; Italian partisans

Commanders and leaders
(Schutzstaffel) Odilo Globočnik (Nazi Germany) Erwin Rösener (Chetniks) Momčilo Đujić	(Yugoslav Partisans) Josip Broz Tito

Units involved
(Schutzstaffel) SS police units (Government of National Salvation) Serbian Volunteer Corps; Serbian State Guard (Chetniks) Dinara Division; National Republican Army; Slovene Home Guard (Hellenic State (1941–1944)) Security Battalions; Russian Liberation Army	(Yugoslav Partisans) 9th Corps (Yugoslav Partisans) 31st Division; Italian Partisan Division

Strength
23,000 soldiers	Unknown

Casualties and losses
Unknown	Heavy

The Operation Winterende was the last operation conducted by the Germans and Chetniks against the Yugoslav Partisans in Slovenia. It was carried out between 10 March and 6 April 1945.

The German offensive was conducted in two sectors: the first, "Operation Frühlingsanfang" whose goal was to clear the western part of Upper Carniola and the Cerkno area and the second, "Winter Ende" whose objective was to clear partisans from Littoral.

== Background ==
By the spring of 1945, it became clear that German forces in northern Italy, southwestern Hungary and Dalmatia could no longer defend against Soviet, Yugoslav and Anglo-American armies. The Germans also expected the Allies to land in Istra and the Gulf of Trieste, which would make defending very difficult if the Partisan forces remained close to German positions. Therefore, the police leaders of the Operational Zone of the Adriatic Littoral, Odilo Globočnik and Erwin Rösener launched the final offensive against the 9th Corps of NOVJ.

== Forces involved ==
Very strong forces were concentrated for this offensive, the units who engaged in the offensive were various Serbian formations (Chetniks, Serbian State Guard, Serbian Volunteer SS Corps), Slovene units, Italian forces, Greek collaborationist forces and SS police units.

== Operation ==
After forming a wide encirclement around the Trnovo Forest, German, Italian and Chetnik forces launched an attack on partisan units on 28 March. Under the pressure of the superior and stronger enemy, the Partisans were forced to retreat after three days of fighting. The 31st Division, in order to avoid further encirclements by the enemy withdrew from the Pivka area, the Italian Partisan Division retreated to Banjšice Plateau, while 30th Division fell back to the Šentviška Plateau.

== See also ==
- Race for Trieste
