= Miodrag Damjanović =

Yugoslav general during World War II

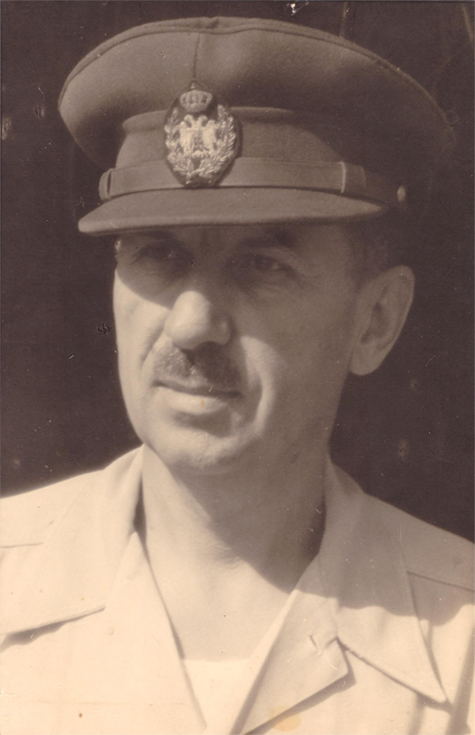
- Born: 16 January 1893; Aleksinac, Kingdom of Serbia
- Died: 4 August 1956 (aged 63); Hanover, West Germany
- Burial place: Osnabrück, Germany
- Military career
- Allegiance: Kingdom of Serbia; Kingdom of Yugoslavia; Government of National Salvation; Chetniks
- Branch: Royal Serbian Army; Royal Yugoslav Army
- Service years: 1909–1941; 1944–1945
- Rank: Brigadier general
- Nickname: Čika Beli (Mr. White)
- Commands: Serbian Volunteer Corps
- Conflicts: Balkan Wars; World War I; World War II in Yugoslavia

Miodrag Damjanović (Serbian Cyrillic: Миодраг Дамјановић; 16 January 1893 – 4 August 1956) was a Serbian brigadier general of the Royal Yugoslav Army. He was chief of staff of Prime Minister Milan Nedić, commander of the Serbian Volunteer Corps and deputy commander of the Chetniks of Draža Mihailović during World War II. After the war, he was the commander of the Yugoslav Army Outside the Homeland during his stay in Allied camps.

== Biography ==
Damjanović was born in Aleksinac on 16 January 1893. He finished elementary school and high school in Kragujevac. He entered the Lower School of the Military Academy in Belgrade in 1909, with the 42nd class.

He went as a cadet sergeant to the First Balkan War in 1912 as a member of the Šumadija Division, and on 1 December of the same year he was promoted to the rank of potporučnik. He entered the Second Balkan War in 1913 as a sergeant of the Šumadija Artillery Regiment, and on 1 October of the same year he was promoted to the rank of lieutenant. He entered the First World War as a class II captain. At the end of 1915, he withdrew with the army through Albania. He was then transferred from Corfu to Thessaloniki. From then until the September offensive in 1918, he commanded the artillery of mountain cannons within the Šumadija Division. On 1 September 1918, he was promoted to the rank of captain of the 1st class.

After the end of the war, he served in the artillery, and in 1922 he entered the Higher School of the Military Academy, which he graduated with honors in 1924. In 1926, he was transferred to the General Staff profession and assigned to the Chief of Staff of the Šumadija Division. He was promoted to the rank of major on Vidovdan in 1920, and on 1 October 1924 to the rank of lieutenant colonel. In 1928, he was transferred to France and he then held the positions of Chief of Staff of the Air Force Command. He was promoted to the rank of colonel in 1929, and on 1 April 1930, he was appointed military envoy to Hungary. In 1932, he was appointed Chief of Staff of the Sava Division, Commander of the Air Regiment, Acting Chief of Staff of the Air Force Command, and in 1935 Chief of Staff of the same command. He was promoted to the rank of brigadier general on 1 December 1937.

In 1938, he became the Chief of Staff of the III Army District, and the Second World War found him in the position of the Chief of Staff of the III Army Group. After the capitulation of the Royal Yugoslav Army in April 1941, he fell into German captivity.

He was in various camps until the beginning of May 1944, when, at the request of General Milan Nedić, he returned to the country and became the head of the cabinet of Nedić's government, instead of Miloš Masalović who was killed by General Draža Mihailović's Chetniks on 8 March 1944. Damjanović used the position to help General Mihailović's movement. The difficult situation for the occupiers and quislings however led to the unification of Chetnik and quisling forces in the spring of 1944 in an attempt to stop the Partisan offensive in southern and southwestern Serbia. Damjanović, together with Dragi Jovanović, accompanied Nedić to the meeting he had with Mihailović in the village of Ražana near Kosjerić in August 1944.

Although the meeting in Pranjani on 6 September 1944 agreed to unite all nationalist forces against the Partisans, it did not happen. The Serbian Volunteer Corps refused to place itself under Damjanović's command, and the Germans also planned to transfer it to Slovenia so that it would not be destroyed in the fight against the Partisans and the Red Army. At Nedić's suggestion, on 6 October 1944, the German commander of Serbia Hans Felber transferred command of the Serbian State Guard to Damjanović. On 6 October, Damjanovic went to the headquarters of the Serbian Command of the Yugoslav Army. From there, Damjanović went to the Supreme Command of the Chetniks in Bosnia. Mihailović appointed him his assistant on 18 December 1944.

After Mihailović accepted Dimitrije Ljotić's plan to unite Mihailović's forces in Bosnia with the Chetniks of Momčilo Đujić and Dobroslav Jevđević along with Ljotić's men who had previously retreated to Slovenia, Mihailović appointed Damjanović in March 1945 as commander of the national forces in Slovenia and Chief of Staff of a prominent part of the Supreme Chetnik Command. Damjanović arrived in Postojna from Bosnia on 26 March, together with Lieutenant Colonel Ljubomir "Patak" Jovanović and Lieutenant Colonel Siniša Ocokoljić. Chetniks and Ljotić's men fought under the name of the Šumadija Division. Together with the Slovenian Home Guard, they were subordinated to senior SS and police leader Odilo Globocnik and were to fight under German command against Partisans in Friuli-Venezia Giulia. The plan however was never realized due to the capitulation of the German Reich, and these forces ended up in part in Austria (with some members of the Slovenian Home Guard being killed in the Bleiburg death marches) or fled in small numbers to Italy and surrendered to the Allies. The troops that surrendered to the Allies in Austria respected the agreed upon principle that the troops surrender to the Allies on the front on which they fought (meaning surrender to the Partisans). The ones who emigrated to Italy managed to do so unscathed.

=== In exile ===
On 1 May 1945, he moved with the Chetnik forces to Italy, and in April 1947 to Germany, where he was interned by the British until May 1948. From 1948 on, he was the president of the Association of Dragoljub Mihailović Fighters of the Royal Yugoslav Army.

He died on 4 August 1956, at the Agnes Karll Clinic in Hanover. He was buried at the Zelhorst cemetery in Hanover with his funeral attended by several hundred comrades-in-arms and other emigrants. Soon after, his remains were transferred to the cemetery in Osnabrück.

== Sources ==
- Tomasevich, Jozo (1975). War and Revolution in Yugoslavia, 1941–1945: The Chetniks. Stanford: Stanford University Press. ISBN 978-0-8047-0857-9.
- Borković, Milan (1979b). Kvinsliška uprava u Srbiji 1941—1944 (knjiga 2). Beograd.
- Tomasevich, Jozo (2002). War and Revolution in Yugoslavia, 1941-1945: Occupation and Collaboration. Stanford: Stanford University Press. ISBN 978-0-8047-3615-2.
- Nikolić, Kosta (2008). General Miodrag M. Damjanović "Čika Beli". London: Udruženje boraca kraljevske Jugoslovenske vojske "Draža Mihailović". ISBN 978-0-9558002-0-7.
