= Serbian State Guard =

Paramilitary unit

- Српска државна стража Srpska državna straža Serbische Staatswache
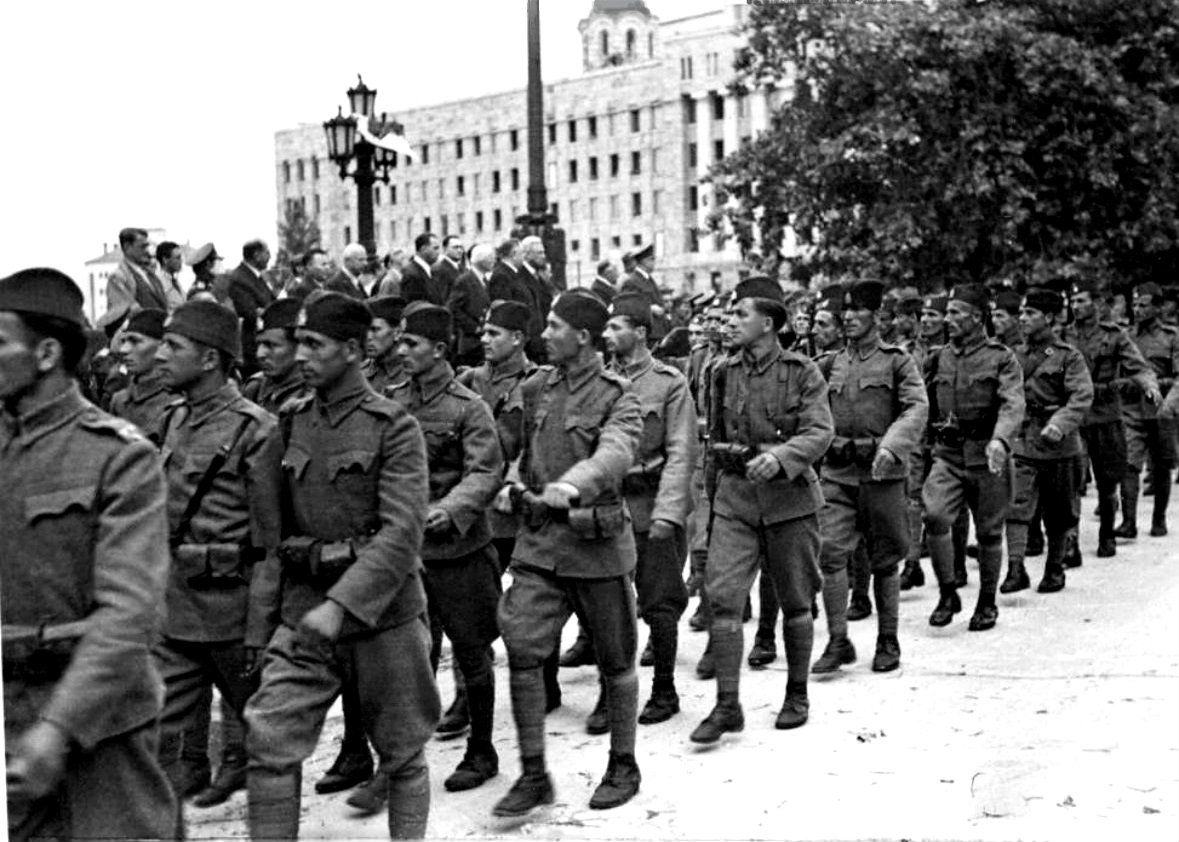
- Serbian State Guard parading in front of the Post office Belgrade, 1944.
- Active: 1942–1945
- Allegiance: Germany; Government of National Salvation (until October 1944); Chetniks (October 1944 – January 1945)
- Type: Gendarmerie
- Role: Anti-Partisan operations
- Size: 25,000-36,000
- Garrison/HQ: Belgrade; Niš; Kragujevac; Kraljevo; Šabac; Požarevac; Zaječar; Valjevo; Užice
- Nicknames: Nedić's men Nedićevci
- Engagements: World War II in Yugoslavia; The National Liberation Struggle of the People of Yugoslavia; Uprising in Serbia (1941); Operation Kosmaj; Battle of Loznica (1941); Operation Uzice; Chetnik Attack on the Užice Republic; World War II in Kosovo; Anti-partisan offensive in Serbia (March 1942); Aćimović offensive; Operation Rudolf; Operation Kopaonik; Attack on Lazarevac (1943); Second breakthrough of the NOVJ into Serbia; Operation Rübenschnitzel; Battle of Serbia; Operation Circus; Belgrade offensive; Niš operation; Fighting on the Višegrad - Sarajevo communication line in November 1944; Retreat of collaborators with the Germans (1944–1945); Serb collaborationist operations in the Slovene Littoral (1944–1945); Operation Winterende; Final operations for the liberation of Yugoslavia in 1945; Race for Trieste

Commanders
- Notable commanders: Dragomir Jovanović; Milan Kalabić

Insignia
- Flag

The Serbian State Guard (Serbian: Srpska državna straža, SDS; Serbian Cyrillic: Српска државна стража; German: Serbische Staatsgarde/Serbische Staatswache), also known as the Nedićevci, was a collaborationist paramilitary force used to impose law and order within the German occupied territory of Serbia during World War II. It was formed from two former Yugoslav gendarmerie regiments, was created with the approval of the German military authorities, and for a long period was controlled by the Higher SS and Police Leader in the occupied territory. It assisted the Germans in imposing one of the most brutal occupation regimes in occupied Europe and helped guard and execute prisoners at the Banjica concentration camp in Belgrade. Its leaders and much of the rank and file were sympathetic to the Chetnik movement of Draža Mihailović, and it was purged by the Germans on several occasions for that reason. In October 1944, as the Soviet Red Army closed on Belgrade, the SDS was transferred to Mihailović's control by a member of the fleeing Nedić administration, but it quickly disintegrated during its withdrawal west, with only a small number of former SDS members being captured by the British near the Italian-Yugoslav border in May 1945.

== History ==
=== Background ===
Following the Axis invasion, occupation and dismantling of Yugoslavia in April 1941, the Wehrmacht established the German occupied territory of Serbia under a military government of occupation. The territory included much of Serbia proper, with the addition of the northern part of Kosovo (around Kosovska Mitrovica), and the Banat. It was the only area of the partitioned Kingdom of Yugoslavia in which the German occupants established a military government, to exploit the key rail and riverine transport routes that passed through it, and its valuable resources, particularly non-ferrous metals. The Military Commander in Serbia appointed Serbian puppet governments to "carry on administrative chores under German direction and supervision". On 29 August 1941, the Germans appointed the Government of National Salvation (Влада народног спаса / Vlada narodnog spasa) under General Milan Nedić, to replace the short-lived Commissioner Administration.

=== Formation ===
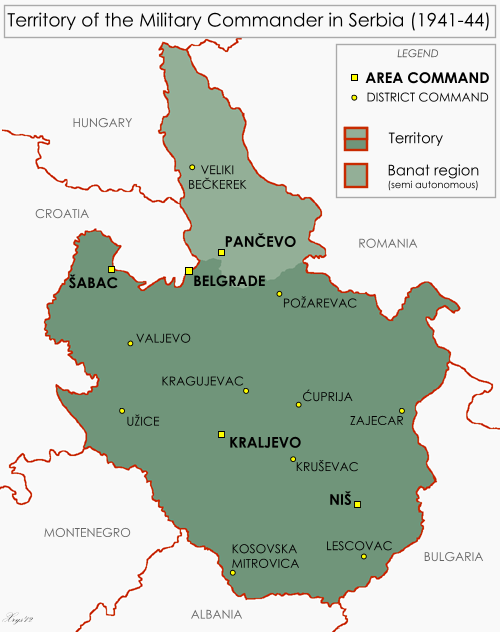
Map of the German occupied territory of Serbia. The five battalions of the SDS were based in Belgrade, Kraljevo, Niš, Valjevo and Zaječar.

The Serbian State Guard (or SDS) was established by Nedić on the basis of an understanding he reached with the German Military Commander in Serbia, General der Artillerie (Lieutenant General) Paul Bader, and the Higher SS and Police Leader in Serbia, SS-Obergruppenführer und Generalleutnant der Polizei (SS-General of Police) August Meyszner, regarding the maintenance of law and order in the occupied territory. It was formed on 10 February 1942 from two former Yugoslav gendarmerie regiments, Drinski and Dunavski, but the law formally creating the force was not issued by Nedić until 2 March 1942. The SDS took over the role and functions of the gendarmerie, and was initially commanded by Stevan Radovanović. Sources vary on the strength of the SDS. The Germans initially set a maximum strength of 17,000, but the SDS quickly reached a strength of 18,500. Initially the SDS included four groups, the Rural Police (poljska straža), the Municipal Police (gradska straža), the Frontier (or Border) Guard (granična straža), and the Village Guard (seljačka straža). The SDS was equipped using arms and ammunition captured by the Germans from throughout Europe, and was organised as a largely static force split across five regions (oblasts): Belgrade, Kraljevo, Niš, Valjevo and Zaječar, with one battalion per region. Each region was further divided into three districts (okrugs), each of which included one or more SDS companies. A branch of the SDS was created specifically for service in the Banat, and was known as the Banat State Guard. It was formed from the region's German minority (or Volksdeutsche), and in March 1942 numbered less than one thousand.

Nedić intended that the SDS would not only maintain law and order and guard the borders, but also monitor the people's requirements and offer assistance and protection in areas such as "health care, cultural, educational and economic life". The SDS was royalist and was rapidly infiltrated by Chetniks loyal to Draža Mihailović. It also lacked sufficient officers, and although it had some initial successes, it never developed into an effective military force. Meyszner took overall control of the SDS three days after its formation, a decision which was strongly opposed by Nedić.

=== Operations ===
Along with other collaborationist military and paramilitary units, the SDS was used against the Partisans operating within the occupied territory. In late 1941, prior to the formation of the SDS, the Serbian gendarmerie had participated in the German-led Operation Uzice, which drove the Partisans and Chetniks from the Užice area. The SDS routinely executed captured Partisans, and frequently took and murdered hostages in towns and villages. The SDS also included former members of the gendarmerie that had assisted German troops to round up hostages to be shot at both Kraljevo and Kragujevac in October 1941. In July 1941, the Banjica concentration camp had been established in the suburbs of Belgrade. It was initially guarded by both the Gestapo and the SDS, but sole responsibility was eventually transferred to the SDS, who behaved sadistically and violently towards the inmates. Survivors of the camp stated that executions at the camp were carried out by both the Belgrade Special Police and the SDS, and that those executed included children. A total of 3,849 people were killed at the camp before it was closed on 3 October 1944. The SDS became increasingly unpopular with the population as time went on. Despite their limited independence, the SDS actively engaged in dehumanising Jews, Roma and communist Serbs, and in killing people from those groups or delivering them to the Germans for execution. They engaged in the execution of hostages both under Gestapo or Wehrmacht control and at their own initiative. The SDS clashed with other collaborationist formations at times, specifically Dimitrije Ljotić's Serbian Volunteer Corps (Srpski dobrovoljački korpus or SDK), and the Pećanac Chetniks loyal to vojvoda Kosta Pećanac.

In March 1942, Nedić suggested to the Germans that the SDK and Pećanac Chetniks be incorporated into the SDS and that he take control of the force, but this idea was firmly rejected. In mid-1942, Meyszner appointed Dragomir Jovanović, the German-approved mayor and chief of police of Belgrade, as chief of Serbian State Security, which included responsibility for the SDS. The Germans considered that Radovanović was a Mihailović sympathiser, so in June 1942 he was replaced by Colonel Borivoje Jonić, the brother of Nedić's minister of education, Velibor Jonić. In July 1942 the SDS consisted of 15,000–20,000 men. In August and September 1942, Nedić again tried to have the SDS placed under his command, and the German refusal to do so contributed to him tendering his resignation. Nedić had threatened to resign several times previously for similar reasons, but on this occasion the Germans took it more seriously and offered him an audience with Adolf Hitler. On that basis, Nedić remained at his post. In October 1942, the Border Guard was transferred to the Ministry of Finance. Also in 1942, the Gestapo arrested some SDS officers suspected of having links with Mihailović, and by the end of 1942 the Germans had purged the SDS in an attempt to eliminate those who sympathised with Mihailović. One of the senior SDS officers arrested by the Gestapo during the purge was Lieutenant Colonel Milan Kalabić, the prefect of Požarevac, and father of one of Mihailović's unit commanders, Nikola Kalabić. The elder Kalabić had been passing information, arms and ammunition to Mihailović's Chetniks. In October 1942, Milan Kalabić was executed by the Germans along with other Chetnik commanders and men.

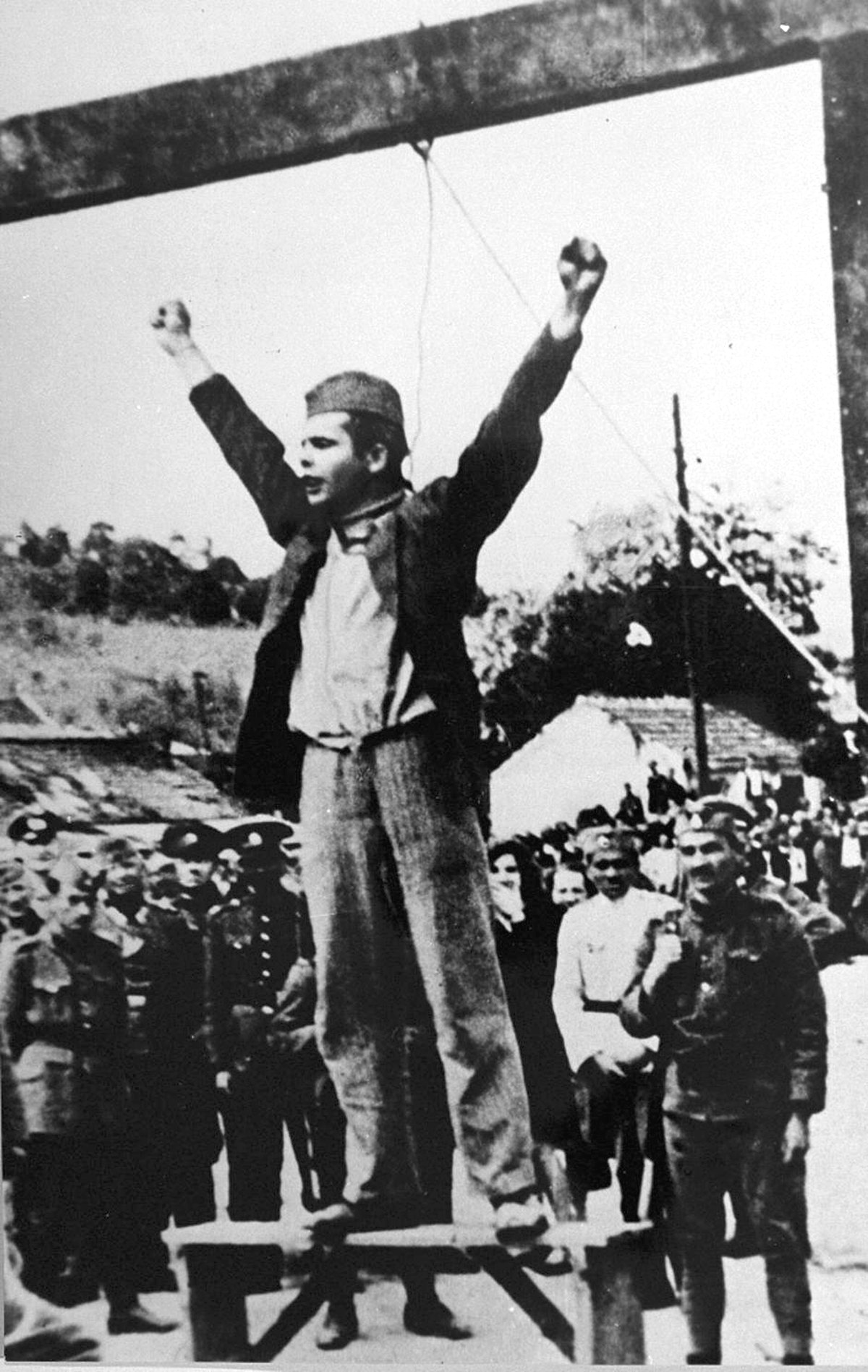
Partisan fighter Stjepan "Stevo" Filipović shouting "Death to fascism, freedom to the People!" seconds before his execution by a Serbian State Guard unit in Valjevo on 22 May 1942.

By 1943, most of the rank and file of the SDS was sympathetic to Mihailović's Chetniks, and SDS units were regularly being "disarmed" by them, sometimes even staging mock battles to disguise transfers of much needed weapons and ammunition to Mihailović's forces. Jovanović himself provided financial assistance to Mihailović from his own discretionary funds. In April 1943, units of the SDS were praised by German commanders for their fighting against the Partisans near Bijeljina in eastern Bosnia. In June 1943, the Germans rounded up and executed 1,139 Serb civilians under suspicion that they had been collaborating with the resurgent Partisans. The SDS were involved in these crimes, and throughout 1943 were actively involved in committing atrocities against Serbian civilians. After many delays, on 18 September 1943 Nedić met with Hitler in Berlin and was promised that he would be given command of the SDS and the SDK. Upon his return to Belgrade, Nedić called upon the Military Commander in Serbia, General der Infanterie Hans Felber, to make arrangements for the transfer of command, but Felber advised him that he had received no orders to do so. It was not until 2 November 1943 that Nedić was finally given command of both the SDS and SDK. In late 1943 the SDS reached its maximum strength of 36,716 men. By February 1944, the SDS leadership were avoiding any direct confrontations with Mihailović's Chetniks.

In the spring and summer of 1944, the SDS had declined to a strength of around 24,000–25,000 men. With the return of the Partisans to Serbia proper, the SDS began to incur serious casualties. For example, between 15 March and 15 August 1944, the SDS lost 157 men killed, 107 wounded and 26 missing. During 1944, SDS started heavy repression in area around Leskovac, because of region's overwhelming support for Yugoslav Partisans. Repression always included beatings and arrests in pro-Partisan villages, and in around half of the villages, Partisan supporters were executed and their houses were burnt down. In late March, SDS unit of Mihajlo Zotović participated in anti-partisan action, alongside German forced and Albanian militia in 6 villages on Pasjača mountain. Part of population of the villages left with Partisans, so mostly women and children remained in them. During operation 9 women and 2 girls were killed, 9 more wounded and 80 more tortured, while razing 87 and robbing almost 200 houses. Witnesses claimed that only SDS troops participated in killing, torture and razing houses. This crime is different to most crimes of SDS, as majority of victims of the crime were women and children. By August 1944, SDS units were responding to Mihailović's call for a general mobilisation by defecting openly to his Chetniks.

According to report by state commission set by post-war authorities dated 25 December 1945, SDS members killed 925 people, mostly men, outside combat, beat up over 8 thousand people, raped 117 women, arrested around 11500 people and razed 850 houses and other objects. While this report is methodologically flawed, it does represent the bases for research of crimes of occupiers and their collaborators in Serbia.

=== Withdrawal and capture ===
Three days after the fall of the Nedić regime on 6 October 1944, Felber transferred the command of the SDS to General Miodrag Damjanović, the head of Nedić's secretariat and a principal confidant of Mihailović within Nedić's administration. Damjanović immediately placed himself and the remaining 6,500 troops of the SDS under Mihailović's command. The SDS was then renamed the "Serbian Shock Corps (Srpski udarni korpus or SUK) of the Yugoslav Army in the Homeland" once again under the command of Radovanović and it joined the withdrawal of other Chetnik formations towards the Sandžak region then into northeastern Bosnia. This arrangement resulted in a difficult and uneasy alliance which began to disintegrate under the pressures of the withdrawal. SUK, alongside Chetniks and Muslim Militia, troops helped Germans take better positions in Sandžak, as they helped them take important towns from the Partisans in October 1944, allowing Army Group E to make retreat to Bosnia.

In the last days of December 1944, the SUK participated, along with other Chetnik formations, in an unsuccessful attempt to capture the Partisan-held city of Tuzla in northeastern Bosnia. This failure and mutual recriminations between Mihailović's Chetniks and the SUK resulted in the effective disintegration of the SUK. By mid-January 1945, 5,000 former SDS members had rejoined the Germans, with some returning to Serbia to take advantage of Josip Broz Tito's amnesty. Most were transported to Austria where they were used in labour battalions under the direction of Organisation Todt, but about 1,500 were allowed to move to the Ljubljana Gap area, where they could join other collaborationist forces, such as the SDK or the Chetnik formations of Momčilo Đujić or Dobroslav Jevđević. Mihailović was not concerned about their departure, describing the former SDS troops as the "worst troops in the world".

The remnants of the SDS/SUK and Mihailović's Chetniks remained under the overall command of Damjanović as part of the Chetnik Šumadija Division. These Chetniks had been under the command of the SS since 12 December 1944. They crossed the river Soča and surrendered to the British Army near the Italian-Yugoslav border on 5 May 1945. Fortunately for them, they were interned as prisoners of war and other than a few senior officers, were not repatriated to Yugoslavia to face trial.

== Uniform and journal ==
The SDS wore either the 1940 pattern olive green uniform of the Royal Yugoslav Army, or the earlier Kingdom of Serbia pattern which was a green-grey in the case of officers, and a greyish-ochre colour for enlisted ranks. These were obtained from stores secured during the invasion. The Review of the Serbian State Guard (Glasnik Srpske Državne Straže) was the official gazette of the SDS, published from 1942 to the end of 1943. The journal was edited by Jonić, and contributors included Nedić and Milan Aćimović.

== Ranks ==
=== Enlisted and NCOs ===
- Enlisted Guard (Stražar pripravnik)
- Guard (Stražar)
- Corporal (Kaplar)
- Sergeant (Podnarednik)
- Staff Sergeant (Narednik)
- Sergeant Major (Narednik vodnik)

=== Officers ===
- 2nd Lieutenant (Potporučnik)
- 1st Lieutenant (Poručnik)
- Captain (Kapetan)
- Major (Major)
- Lieutenant Colonel (Potpukovnik)
- Colonel (Pukovnik)
- Brigadier General (Brigadni Đeneral)
