= Mihailo Olćan =

Serbian soldier and politician

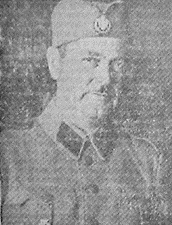

Minister of Economy of German-occupied Serbia
- In office 29 August 1941 – 11 October 1942
- Prime Minister: Milan Nedić
- Preceded by: Office established
- Succeeded by: Milorad Nedeljković

Personal details
- Born: 18 September 1894 Crepaja, Austria-Hungary
- Died: 21 November 1961 (aged 67) Adelaide, Australia
- Party: Yugoslav National Movement (Zbor)
- Education: Eötvös Loránd University
- Profession: Physician
- Awards: Cross of St. George; Order of the White Eagle

Military service
- Branch/service: (Austria-Hungary) Austro-Hungarian Army (Russian Empire) Imperial Russian Army
- Years of service: 1914–1918
- Battles/wars: European Theatre of World War I: Eastern Front; Salonika front

Mihailo Olćan (Serbian Cyrillic: Михаило Олћан; 18 September 1894 – 21 November 1961) was a Serbian soldier and politician. During World War II, he served as the Minister for the Economy in Milan Nedić's German-installed Government of National Salvation which operated in the Territory of the Military Commander in Serbia between 1941 and 1944. He fled Yugoslavia towards the end of the war and emigrated to Australia, where he died in 1961.

== Early life ==
Mihailo Olćan was born on 18 September 1894 in Crepaja, Austria-Hungary. He was a nephew of Serbian inventor Mihailo Pupin and finished gymnasium in Novi Sad, where he joined a number of nationalist student movements. Olćan enrolled to study medicine at the university in Pest. He joined the Austro-Hungarian Army with the outbreak of World War I and was sent to fight on the Eastern Front, where he defected to the Russians and joined a Serbian volunteer detachment. He distinguished himself while fighting for the Serbs and was awarded the Cross of St. George and the Order of the White Eagle with swords. He later fought on the Salonika front. In the post-war years, he led several volunteer organizations in Vojvodina and lived in Petrovgrad (modern Zrenjanin). He joined the Yugoslav National Movement (Serbian: Jugoslovenski narodni pokret, Zbor) upon its creation in 1935. The movement's leader, Dimitrije Ljotić, came to see Olćan as one of his most trusted lieutenants.

== World War II ==
Following the Axis invasion and occupation of Yugoslavia, Olćan became a member of puppet administration known as the Government of National Salvation. On 29 August 1941, he was named to a ministerial position with the government of Prime Minister Milan Nedić. Nedić appointed him Minister of Economy.

At a government meeting on 14 September 1941, Olćan suggested that Ljotić's volunteers be armed to suppress an uprising by the Yugoslav Partisans. The puppet government conceded and Olćan later established a recruitment office for the Serbian Volunteer Command (Serbian: Srpska dobrovoljačka komanda, SDK). More than 600 volunteers enlisted within the next several days. The following month, Olćan boasted that Serbia "has been allowed what no other occupied country has been allowed [and that is] to establish law and order [...] by means of [its] own armed forces." In the spring of 1942, he commented on The Holocaust and stated that the Jews had "met the fate they deserved" after being blessed by Serbian Orthodox Bishop Nikolaj Velimirović. He explained that Serbs should be grateful that "the powerful sledgehammer of Germany had come down not on the heads of the Serbian people but on the heads of Serbia's Jews instead".

Olćan was dismissed from Nedić's cabinet in October 1942 and became, on German insistence, a de facto political commissar of the Serbian Volunteer Corps (Serbian: Srpski dobrovoljački korpus, SDK) in October 1943. (Note: Olćan's term as Minister of Economy ended on 11 October 1942. He was succeeded by Milorad Nedeljković.) He worked as a direct representative of Dimitrije Ljotić and enjoyed the full confidence of the Germans. In early 1944, Olćan was sent to Montenegro, along with a detachment of the SDK, in order to help establishment of the Montenegrin Volunteer Corps under the command of Pavle Đurišić. In December, he and other members of the now-exiled Serbian puppet administration met with Velimirović and Serbian Patriarch Gavrilo V in Vienna.

== Exile and death ==
Olćan fled Yugoslavia at the end of the war and moved to Australia, where he lived until his death in late 1961.
