= Ralja (Sopot) =

Ralja Раља
- Village
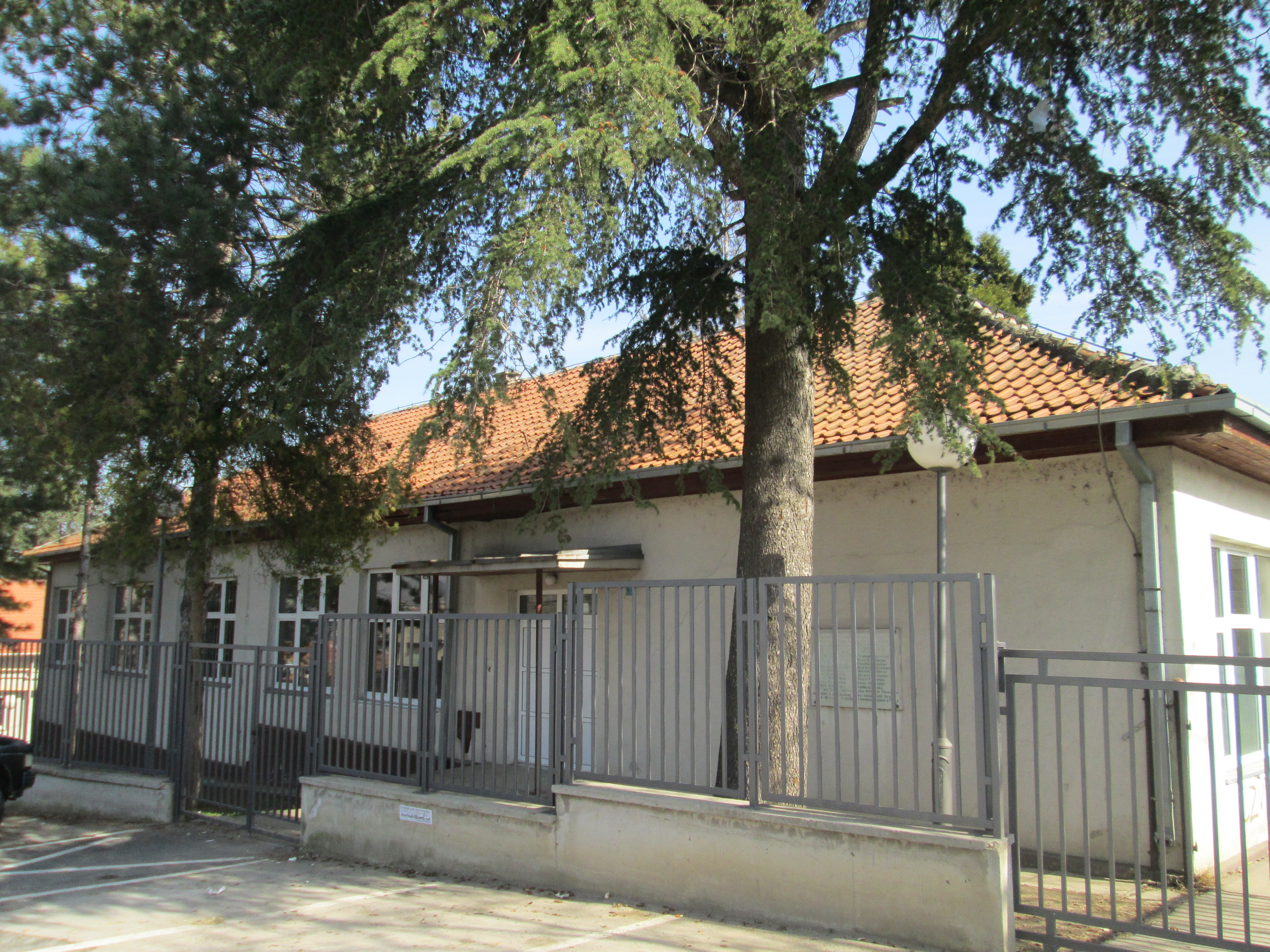
- Ralja Primary School

- Location within Serbia
- Coordinates: 44°34′N 20°33′E
- Country: Serbia
- District: Belgrade District
- Municipality: Sopot

Population (2022)
  - Total: ▼2,904
- Time zone: UTC+1 (CET)
  - Summer (DST): UTC+2 (CEST)

Ralja (Serbian Cyrillic: Раља) is a village in the municipality of Sopot, Serbia. According to the 2022 census, the village has a population of 2,904 people.

Elementary school was founded by the Ministry of Education in 1923. In 1959 it was named "Cana Marjanović" after the teacher and anti-Nazi activist Aleksandra Cana Marković (1910–1942) from the neighboring village of Popović, who was executed in Jajinci. The school building was annexed in 1976, while the old part was reconstructed in 2020. It has over 400 pupils and satellite units in the villages of Popović, Parcani, Stojnik and Babe.
