= Race for Trieste =

1945 WWII battle

Coordinates: 45°39′1″N 13°46′13″E

- Part of World War II in Yugoslavia and the Spring 1945 offensive in Italy
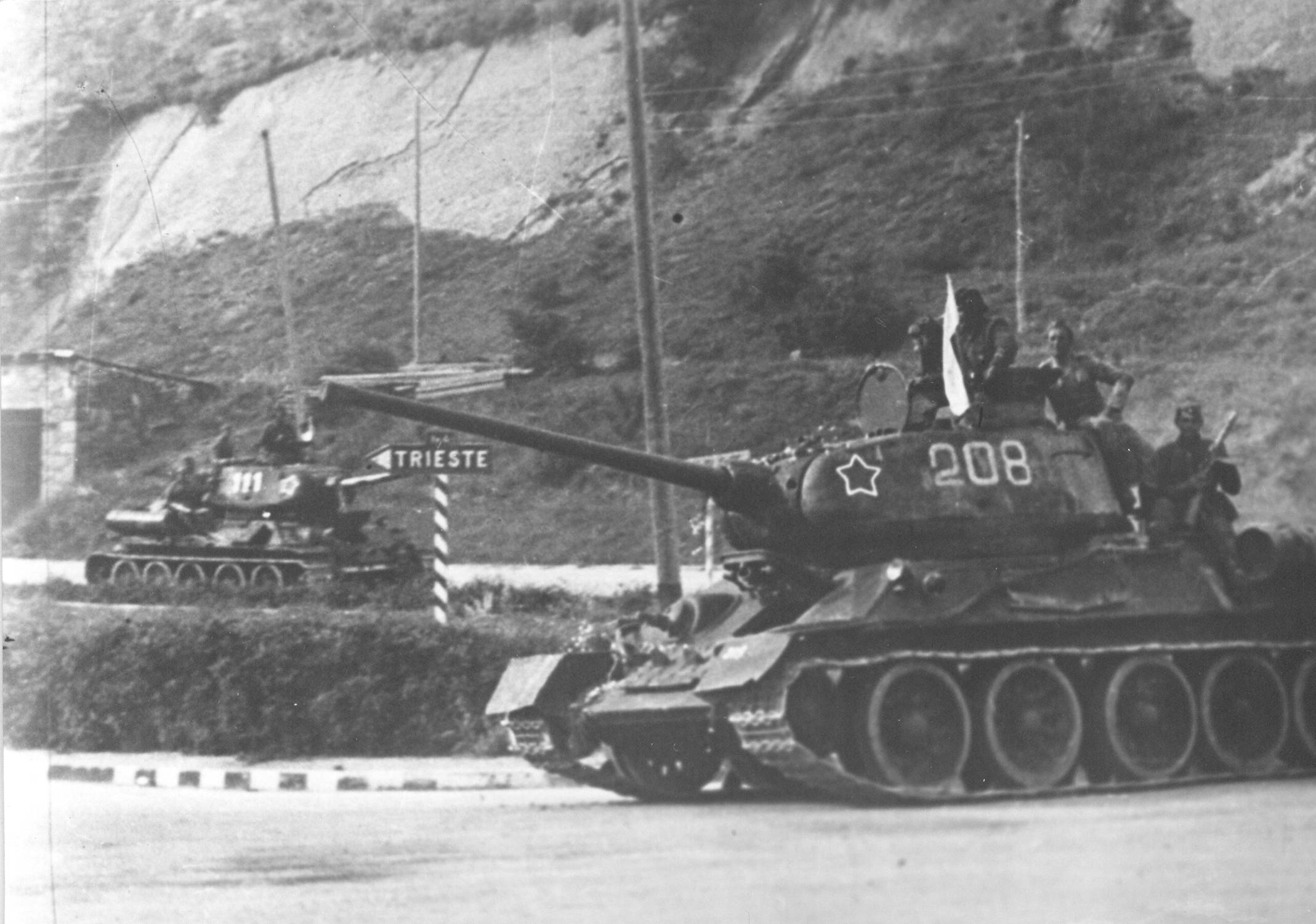
- Tanks of the Yugoslav 4th Army in Trieste
Date	30 April – 3 May 1945 (3 days)
Location	Trieste, Kingdom of Italy
Result	Allied victory: Joint occupation of Trieste until June; Establishment of the Free Territory of Trieste in 1947

Belligerents
Yugoslavia; New Zealand; Italian Resistance	Germany; Italian Social Republic; Chetniks (Government of National Salvation) Serbian Volunteer Corps; Serbian State Guard

Commanders and leaders
(Democratic Federal Yugoslavia) Petar Drapšin (Dominion of New Zealand) Bernard Freyberg; Ercole Miani	(Nazi Germany) Odilo Globočnik (Italian Social Republic) Giovanni Esposito (Chetniks) Momčilo Đujić (surrendered) (Chetniks) Miodrag Damjanović

Units involved
(Democratic Federal Yugoslavia) 4th Army (Dominion of New Zealand) 2nd Division	(Nazi Germany) 97th Corps: 188th Division; 237th Division; 10th SS Police Regiment; (Italian Social Republic) 204th Regional Military Command; (Chetniks) Dinara Division; 1st Regiment; 5th Regiment; (Government of National Salvation) Remnants

Strength
(Democratic Federal Yugoslavia) 68,601–84,000^{:243} (Dominion of New Zealand) 19,423	(Nazi Germany) 20,000^{:286} (Italian Social Republic) 5,000 (Chetniks) 13,000

Casualties and losses
(Dominion of New Zealand) 436 dead 1,159 wounded	2,842 killed 3,829–5,200 captured 99 cannons 74 AA guns
- 6,500–8,500 civilians killed

The Race for Trieste (Italian: Corsa per Trieste), also known as the Trieste Operation (Slovene: Tržaška operacija), was a battle during the Second World War that took place during early May 1945. It led to a joint allied victory for the Yugoslav Partisans and 2nd New Zealand Division and a joint occupation of Trieste, but relations soon deteriorated and led to a nine-year dispute over the territory of Trieste. This battle is also considered the last battle in which a considerable force of Chetniks fought, as 13,000 of the irregular troops under Momčilo Đujić surrendered to the New Zealand forces under Lieutenant General Sir Bernard Freyberg as the battle progressed.

== Prelude ==
=== Yugoslav Front ===
The Yugoslavs achieved a breakthrough after a series of hard-fought encounters along the Syrmian Front in late 1944 and early 1945. The newly formed Yugoslav 4th Army, whose elements were present at the pivotal Battle of Knin, spent most of spring advancing north along the Dinaric Alps from their staging grounds on the banks of the Neretva with the intent of reaching the Isonzo and taking Trieste without help from Western Allies, thereby justifying a claim to the de jure Italian port.

The 4th Army was led by Petar Drapšin, who had previously led the incorporated 8th Corps until he was promoted to the rank of lieutenant general.

=== Italian Front ===
On the Italian front, Western Allied forces advanced towards Trieste after breaching the Gothic Line in early March 1945. Under Lieutenant General Sir Bernard Freyberg, the New Zealand 2nd Division, having captured Faenza on 14 December 1944, reorganized on the south banks of the Senio River on 8 April 1945. There it paused to prepare for what would be the final Allied offensive in Italy. After a brief respite, the division raced on, crossing the Santerno, Gaiana, Idice, and the Po rivers. They took Padua on 28 April, crossing the Isonzo on 1 May and reaching Ronchi dei legionari found partizans from IX Slovenian corps, and then reach Trieste the next day. The New Zealanders arrived just in time to accept a surrender of last German unit at fort San Giusto (about 7000 soldiers), in the city liberated by local partisans and units of Josip Tito's Fourth Yugoslav Army. The 2nd division had covered a distance of 220 km (140 mi) in less than a week.

=== Situation inside Trieste ===
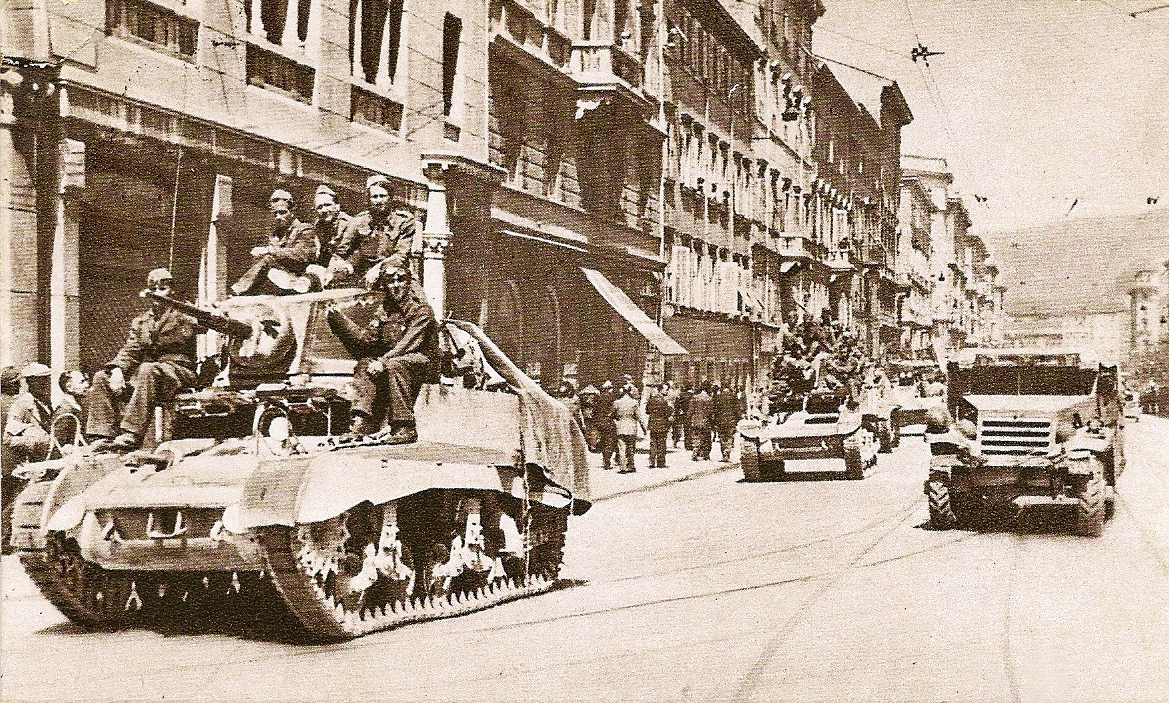
Tito's army in Trieste

Civil authorities in Trieste, formally part of the Italian Social Republic although under de facto German control through the Operational Zone of the Adriatic Littoral, consisted of prefect Bruno Coceani and podestà (mayor) Cesare Pagnini. The Italian Resistance was active within the city through the local National Liberation Committee, led by Socialist Carlo Schiffrer, Christian Democrat Edoardo Marzari, Action Party member Ercole Miani and Liberal Party member Antonio Selem. The representatives of the Italian Communist Party had instead withdrawn from the local CLN in the summer of 1944, following disagreements on the cooperation with the Yugoslav Resistance (the Communists favored an alliance, whereas the members of the other parties feared that the Yugoslavs were aiming at annexing Trieste to Yugoslavia).

In early April 1945 Coceani had proposed to Pagnini and, through the latter, to Carlo Schiffrer to unite all Italian forces against the Yugoslavs, in an attempt to try to stem the advance of Tito's forces, thus allowing the Western Allies to precede them in the occupation of Trieste. A few years later Coceani would write that Benito Mussolini himself had given him the order to act in this sense: "The order given by the Duce was to make contact with the exponents of the liberation committee, with all the Italian parties, even with the Communists, in order to create a bloc of the Italian forces against the annexationist designs of the Slavs." On April 4, 1945, Coceani had asked Mussolini for support in the defense of Trieste, and for the same purpose he had sent emissaries to Rome in order to contact the royalist government in the south in an attempt to obtain help for the defense of the eastern border. Admiral Raffaele de Courten, Chief of Staff of the Italian Co-belligerent Navy, had answered positively, and a landing by forces of the Regia Marina, with the support of the Decima Flottiglia MAS and of other RSI troops, had been planned, with or without Allied intervention; the plan however failed due to British opposition. On 10 April the mayor Pagnini held an organizational meeting of five hundred Italians in the town hall, with the aim of uniting all Italian forces, avoiding attacks on the Germans – who as long as they defended the city against the Yugoslavs were to be considered allies – and transfer all powers to the CLN when the Germans left. It was decided that the 1,800 men of the Civic Guard (Trieste's municipal police, raised by Coceani in 1944) would have also passed under the command of the CLN.

On 28 April Bruno Sambo, head of the local PFR, handed over the arms of the fascist party to Coceani's public health committee, and agreed to replace the party insignia with tricolor ribbons; that same evening some Italian police units came out on the streets with the tricolor ribbons, but were quickly disarmed by the Germans. In the meantime, however, after lengthy discussions, the local CLN decided to reject Coceani's proposals to join forces against the Yugoslavs, and decided to act against the Germans. On the night of 29 April, all German troops in Trieste received the order from Odilo Globočnik to withdraw towards Tolmezzo; Coceani informed CLN representative Ercole Miani of this, and on the next morning the National Liberation Committee proclaimed a general insurrection against the Germans. Carabinieri and Guardia di Finanza troops defected to the Resistance, Coceani resigned and the CLN assumed all powers after clashes against the remaining German and Fascist troops.

== Battle ==
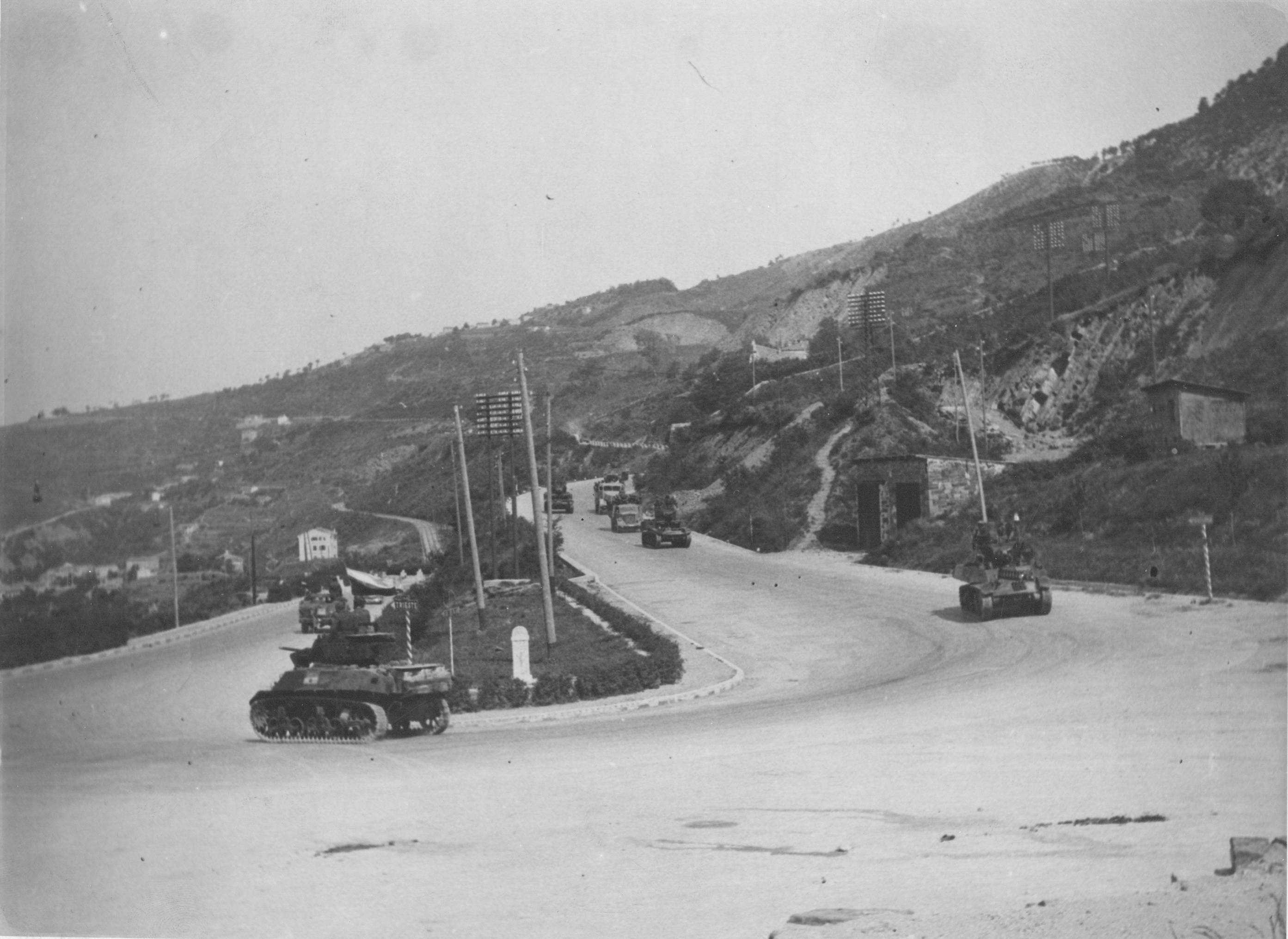
Partisans on their way to Trieste

By 30 April, the Partisans had surrounded the port city entirely. They began moving on 1 May in with the help of fighters that had infiltrated the city before the arrival of the main force. By 30 April elements of the Yugoslav force had taken multiple strategic locations from Globočnik's force such as the university, courthouse, and military hospital. On the morning of 1 May, parts of the eastern force broke through at Ricmanje and Botač and entered the city. According to Yugoslav reports, resistance had been overcome save a few isolated pockets of Germans, focused around Opčine and the harbor. By the evening of 1 May, Partisans had taken the Elba battery factory and Sabo park, where they were joined by about 50 armed Triestino antifascists. There the 4th Brigade of the 9th Dalmatian Division met and attacked a force of about a thousand German and Chetnik soldiers. On the morning of 2 May this culminated in a two-hour firefight followed by the surrender of the enemy force.^{:281–283,429}

By the end of 2 May, with the arrival of the New Zealand force, most of the 13,000 Chetnik irregulars assisting the German defenders surrendered. Fighting lasted into the next day. The remaining German pockets on the north side of the city, the largest of which being the Opčine pocket, surrendered by the end of 3 May.^{:282–283}

== Aftermath ==
In the first 40 days after taking Trieste, before their withdrawal on 12 June 1945, Yugoslav forces arrested thousands of people, suspected to belong to Fascist organizations or to oppose the planned annexation of the city by Yugoslavia; many were killed in the Foibe massacres.

The city was jointly occupied by the New Zealanders and Partisans until June 1945, when it came under rule of a UN-mandated military provisional government as a provision of the Treaty of Peace with Italy. It remained a de facto free state until it was partitioned between its two neighbors in October 1954. This was later reaffirmed in the Treaty of Osimo, where it was split de jure between Italy and Yugoslavia.

== See also ==
- Mostar Operation
