= Anti-Partisan action in Srem (1944) =

Nazi collaborationist attack in Yugoslavia in WWII

- Part of World War II in Yugoslavia
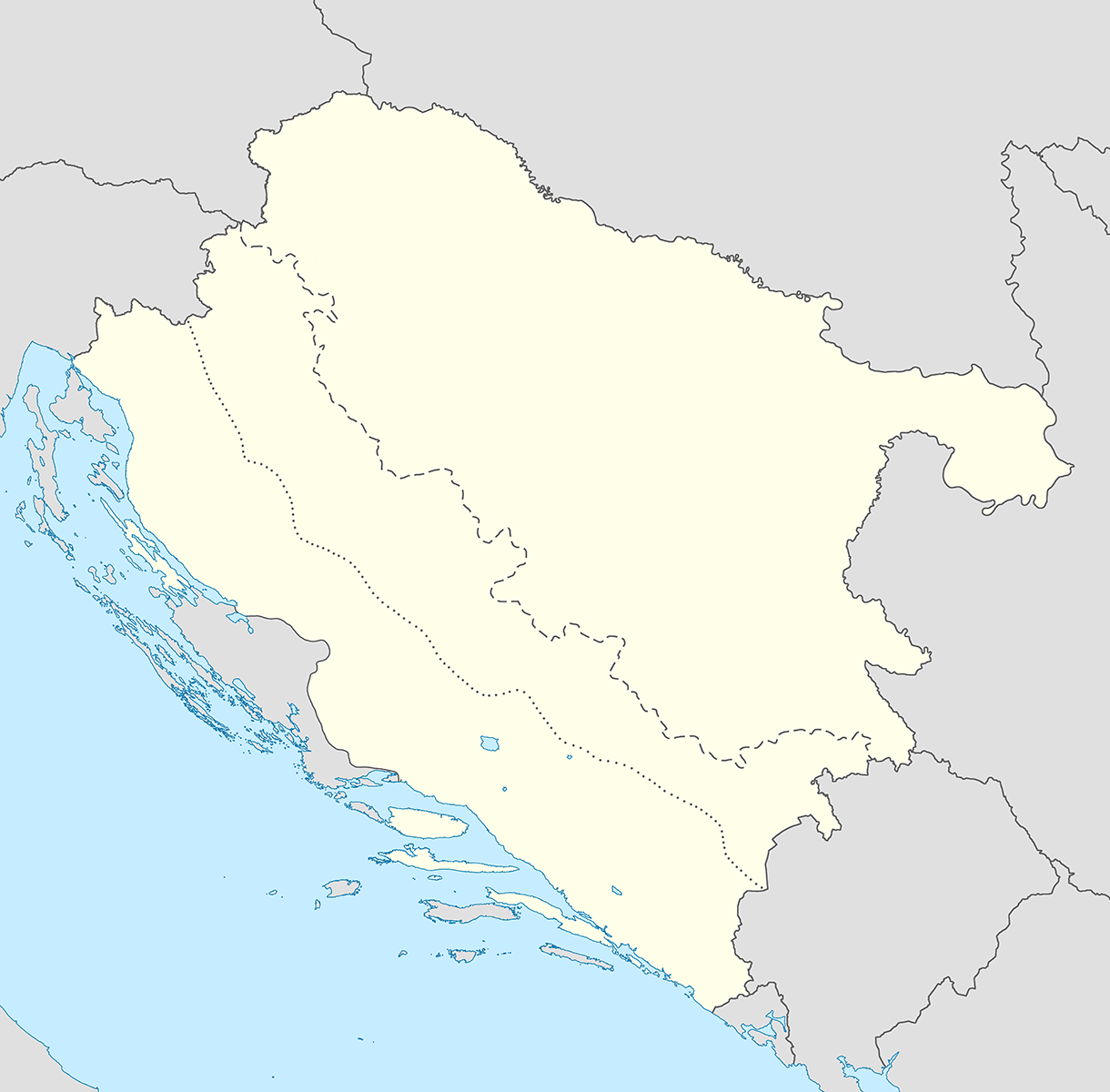
- Srem (NDH) Srem (Serbia)
Date	October, 1944
Location	Srem, Independent State of Croatia
Result	Serbian Volunteer Corps victory: Clearing of Partisan units and their withdrawal; In November SDK became part of the Waffen-SS

Belligerents
(Government of National Salvation) Serbian Volunteer Corps: 2nd Battalion	Yugoslav Partisans

Commanders and leaders
(Government of National Salvation) Marisav Petrović	Unknown

Casualties and losses
2 killed	Unknown, 1 commander captured

The Anti-Partisan action in Srem was conducted by the Serbian Volunteer Corps with the goal of clearing local partisan units and advancing in the Buđanovci–Hrtkovci–Jarak line and Sremska Mitrovica.
