= Serbian Volunteer Corps (World War II) =

Serbian collaborationist paramilitary group and the Waffen-SS unit during WWII

- Српски добровољачки корпус Srpski dobrovoljački korpus Serbisches Freiwilligenkorps
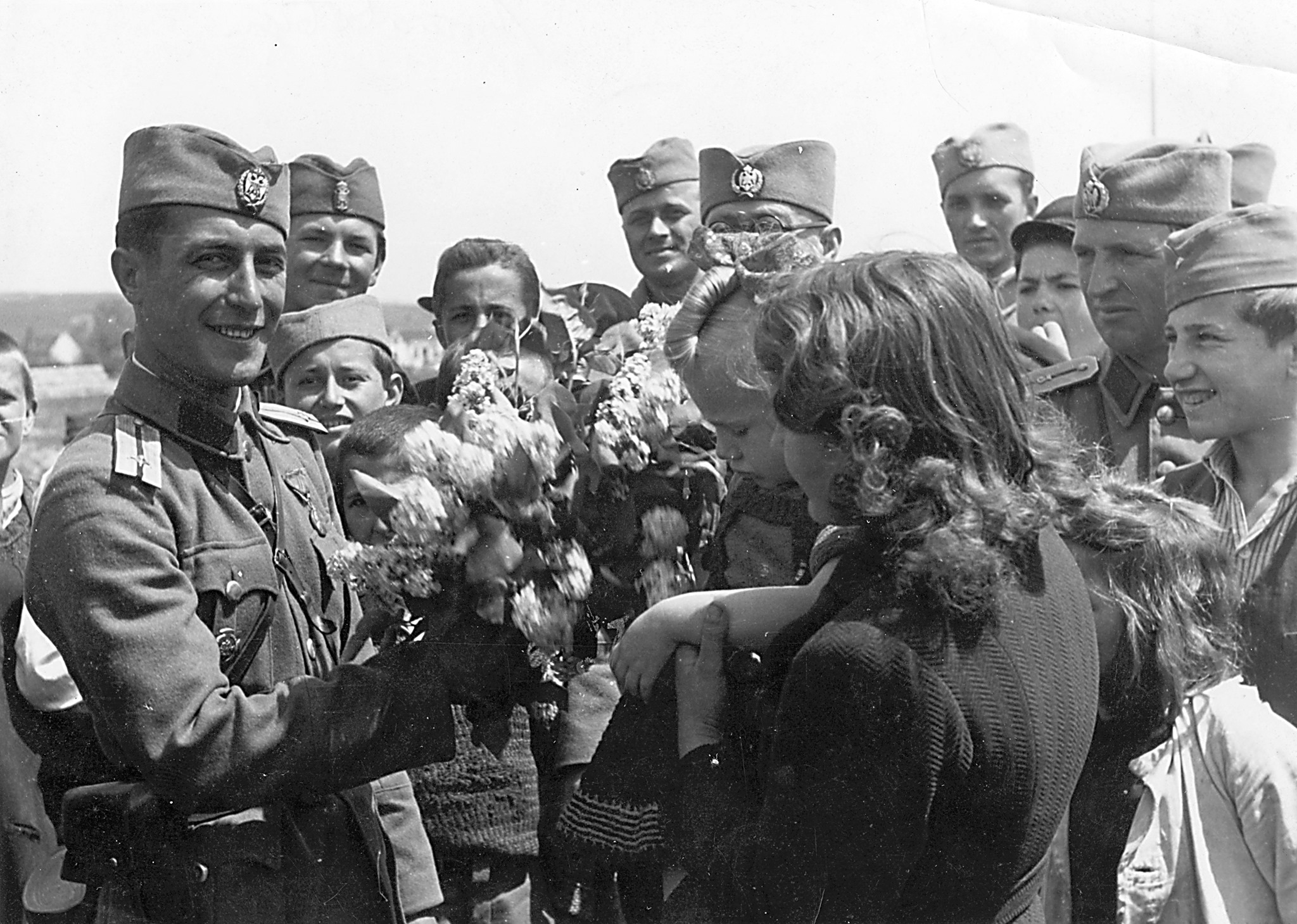
- Serbian Volunteer Corps Fourth Battalion with a commander Miloš Vojnović Lautner on the left.
- Country: (Nazi Germany) German-occupied territory of Serbia
- Allegiance: Yugoslav National Movement (1941); Government of National Salvation (1941–1944); Nazi Germany (1941–45)
- Branch: Paramilitary
- Role: Anti-partisan operations
- Size: 9,886–10,300 (1944)
- Part of: Waffen-SS (1944–45); Chetniks (from 30 March 1945)
- Garrison/HQ: Valjevo; Kragujevac; Šabac; Smederevo; Kruševac
- Nickname: Ljotić's men (Ljotićevci)
- Patron: St George
- Mottos: "With faith in God, for the King and Fatherland!"
- March: Vojska smene
- Engagements: World War II in Yugoslavia; Uprising in Serbia (1941); Operation Užice; Kragujevac massacre; Operation Mihailovic; Aćimović offensive; Battle of Gvozdac (1944) (Note: Around 50 Ustaše attacked Gvozdac on 5 August 1944. After short fight with the 1st regiment of the SDK they were repulsed, suffering over 15 killed while SDK had 1 killed and 1 wounded.); Battle of Serbia; Battle for Southern Serbia; Battle of Jelova Gora; Belgrade offensive; Retreat of collaborators with the Germans (1944–1945); Anti-Partisan action in Srem (1944); Syrmian Front; Serbian operations in the Slovene Littoral (1944–1945); Operation Winterende; Final operations for the liberation of Yugoslavia in 1945; Race for Trieste; Battle of Poljana; Chetnik insurgency in Yugoslavia (1944–1950)

Commanders
- Notable commanders: Kosta Mušicki (executed); Ilija Kukić; Miodrag Damjanović
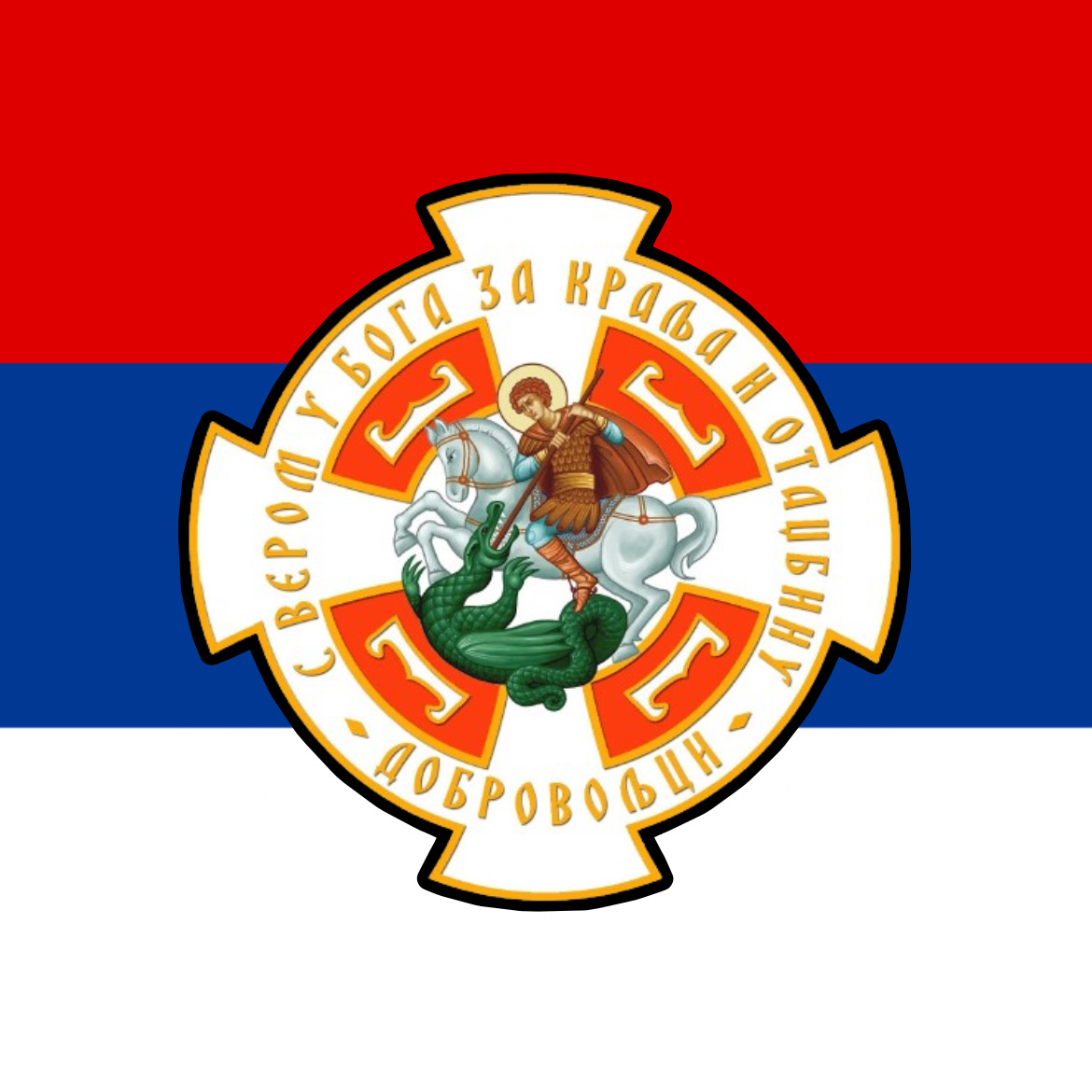
- Banner

The Serbian Volunteer Corps (Serbian Cyrillic: Српски добровољачки корпус, Serbian: Srpski dobrovoljački korpus, SDK for short; German: Serbisches Freiwilligenkorps), also known as Ljotićevci (Serbian Cyrillic: Љотићевци), (Note: after their ideological leader Dimitrije Ljotić) was the paramilitary branch of the fascist (Note: There are a substantial number of sources that label Zbor as a fascist organisation, and also a substantial number of sources that describe Zbor's leader, Dimitrije Ljotić, as fascist.) political organisation Zbor, which collaborated with the forces of Nazi Germany in the German-occupied territory of Serbia, (Note: The official name of this territory was the Territory of the Military Commander in Serbia.) while loyal to the King of Yugoslavia Peter II, during World War II.

In July 1941, following a full-scale rebellion by communist Yugoslav Partisans and royalist Chetniks, the German military commander in Serbia pressured Milan Nedić's collaborationist government to deal with the uprisings under the threat of letting the armed forces of the Independent State of Croatia, Hungary, and Bulgaria occupy the territory and maintain peace and order in it. A paramilitary militia called the Serbian Volunteer Detachments was formed, the unit, never formally part of the German armed forces, numbered about 3,500 men, mostly Serbian but also included some Croats and Slovenes. It was reorganised as the Serbian Volunteer Corps, at the end of 1942, and placed under the command of Colonel Kosta Mušicki. By 1944, the majority of the Serbian Volunteer Corps recruits were draftees as opposed to volunteers and reached a peak strength of 9,886 men.

After the Red Army entered Serbia and Belgrade was liberated in October 1944, the corps retreated with the Germans into the Slovene Lands. In November it was taken over by the Waffen-SS, and incorporated into the SFK: Serbisches Freiwilligen Korps (Serbian Volunteer Corps), an infantry unit composed of the various Nedić's collaborationist groups on the run. The surviving members of the three SFK regiments, retreated into Austria where they surrendered to the British on 12 May 1945 near Klagenfurt. Most of the men were returned to Yugoslavia where they were executed on charge of treason.

== Formation ==
On 14 September 1941, at a government meeting, minister Mihailo Olćan proposed that the puppet government should call upon the Serbian population to form anti-communist units. The next day 234 members of Yugoslav National Movement (ZBOR), Ljotić's and Olćan's pre-war political party enlisted as the first volunteers. On 6 October, Milan Nedić, the Prime Minister of the Axis-installed puppet Government of National Salvation, appointed Mušicki to lead the Serbian Volunteer Command. The command consisted of 12 companies, each 120-150 men strong. It had 153 officers and 1,779 other ranks. Many volunteers came from the student ZBOR organization and others were refugees from the Independent State of Croatia. The men wore olive green uniforms or, in the case of officers, the uniform of the former Yugoslav armed forces, with the Cross of St. George on the right breast. Ranks or grade designations were for all practical purposes those of the former Royal Yugoslav Army. Weapons were mixed; besides German arms which were eventually supplied, foreign rifles and machine guns, especially those seized as war booty from the defeated Yugoslav forces were used. Mortars and light artillery were also on hand in varying quantities. The command also had an educational department whose task was to educate fighters ideologically. The head of the educational section was journalist Ratko Parežanin. It also had an intelligence section which had centres all over Serbia. The corps often operated in close alliance with the Russian Corps.

The Serbian Volunteer Corps was formally under Nedić's Command of Gendarmerie, but it was, like SDS and SGS, under direct control of SS and Police Leader August Meyszner and Commanding General in Serbia. In operations in the field, its units were put under tactical command of German divisions. Ljotić himself had no control over SDK. SDK units were not allowed to move from the assigned territory without German authorization.

== Uniform ==
Serbian Volunteer Corps received Yugoslav or Italian olive green uniforms on which they wore black cloth collar patches (dark blue after 1943), rank badges on the shoulder straps, and a metal corps badge on the right breast. Their helmets were either Italian or Czechoslovak.

== Active duty ==
The volunteers saw their first action on 17 September 1941 in Dražanj village near Grocka, clearing the area of communists with four Yugoslav Partisans and two SDK members killed. In November before an offensive in the Republic of Užice Milan Nedić ordered that the SDK, Serbian State Guard and Kosta Pećanac's Chetniks should be put under joint command. On 22 November a joint military formation called the Šumadija Corps was formed under the command of Mušicki. The Corps was put under the command of the German 113th Division with which they fought between 25 and 29 November after the majority of Partisan troops had escaped to the Italian zone.

After defeating Partisan troops, the Germans turned to fighting Draža Mihailović's Chetniks. Konstantin Mušicki informed Mihailović of the German plans and Mihailović managed to evade capture. Due to this Mušicki was arrested on 9 December in Čačak and replaced by Brigadier Ilija Kukić. Nedić intervened to secure Mušicki's release and he was back in command as soon as those Germans that were familiar with the case had left Belgrade at the end of 1942.

By 15 February 1942, the Corps had a strength of 172 officers and 3,513 men, which was very close to the planned strength for the five battalions. During 1942 SDK clashed with Partisans in southern Serbia. Although they inflicted considerable losses on the Partisans they didn't manage to crush them completely in southern Serbia. In western Serbia, SDK with gendarmerie, Germans and Chetniks attacked the Kosmaj, Valjevo and Suvobor Partisan battalions who had returned from Bosnia. They managed to defeat all except the Valjevo unit which escaped through enemy lines. At the end of 1942 there were 12 companies in 5 battalions and Germans granted them formal recognition on 1 January 1943, by officially changing its designation to the Serbian Volunteer Corps.

In 1943, the SDK clashed with the Partisans near Požarevac, Kruševac, Aranđelovac and in Mačva. They also clashed with Mihailović's Chetniks. On 28 September, Chetniks killed Dušan Marković, commander of the 4th volunteer battalion with 20 of his volunteers and soon after Miloš Vojnović Lautner, commander of the 3rd volunteer battalion. On 15 May the Wehrmacht captured 4000 Chetniks under Major Pavle Đurišić in Montenegro. Đurišić was to be sent to Strij camp in Poland but managed to escape and was in Belgrade in November that year. Đurišić was soon captured by the Gestapo but under guarantees of Nedić and Ljotić was released on the condition that he put his troops under SDK command. Đurišić accepted the offer, formed three SDK regiments and became Mušicki's second in command.

The Partisans had meanwhile grown to an army of considerable strength, and by the summer of 1943 were once again active throughout Serbia. This renewed activity greatly worried the responsible German commanders, since the strength of the occupation forces had declined considerably during the relatively peaceful months of 1942. Nedić was also aware of this problem, and went to see Adolf Hitler at Obersalzberg in the hope of finding a solution. The meeting was on 15 September 1943, and Nedić managed to secure an agreement for the reinforcement of the SDK by five additional battalions, with a further five to follow as circumstances permitted. These measures were immediately carried out, and by 20 October each of the five independent battalions had become a regiment with a strength of two battalions. Training for the five new battalions took place at the respective regimental garrison locations: SDK 1st Regiment in Valjevo, 2nd Regiment in Kragujevac, 3rd in Šabac, 4th in Smederevo, and 5th in Kruševac. Corps headquarters stayed in Belgrade.

From March to May 1944, the 2nd and 5th Partisan divisions were pushed back from Western Serbia by a large heterogeneous force. On June 21 Milan Nedić ordered the formation of the Iron Regiment in Leskovac but during its formation most troops escaped to the Chetniks. By 21 August 1944 the five-regiment SDK had reached a strength of 9,886 officers and men, and from its inception to September 1944 had suffered 700 killed and 1,800 wounded in action.

According to report by state commission set by post-war authorities dated December 25, 1945, SDK members killed 618 people, mostly men, outside combat, beat up around 5 thousand people, raped 49 women, arrested around 10 thousand people, sent around thousand people to forced labour and razed 136 houses and other objects. While this report is methodologically flawed, it does represent the bases for research of crimes of occupiers and their collaborators in Serbia.

== Retreat and demise ==
In September the Partisans with Red Army support began their final offensive in Serbia. In mid-September 1944, a corps unit saved Draža Mihailović and the Chetnik Supreme Command in northwest Serbia from capture by the Partisans.

The major battle was on 9 September when the Partisans totally defeated joint SDK and Chetnik forces. SDK was in early October given a task to defend the Šabac bridgehead and Sava river against Partisans, together with some German units and under the command of Colonel Jungenfeld, the commander of the 5th Police Regiment. On 14 October the battle for Belgrade started, and Germans decided to evacuate SDK to some place where it can be used in guarding duties and anti-partisan actions, since SDK was considered unsuitable for full frontal combat. Hitler ordered to move SDK to Operational Zone of the Adriatic Littoral, and to put it under Higher SS and Police Leader of OZAK, under Commander in Chief South-West. Army Group F Commander ordered boarding of SDK for the evacuation on 17 October on railway station Ruma, as the clearance from High Command of the South-West was received for transport on 19–21 October. On its new position SDK participated in anti-Partisan operations.

The withdrawal began on 8 October during the final joint Partisan and Soviet assault on Belgrade when the 1st volunteer regiment under Major Ilija Mićašević and 4th volunteer regiment under Major Vojislav Dimitrijević crossed the Sava river. The 3rd regiment under Major Jovan Dobrosavljević delayed crossing the Sava as they were fighting the Partisans in Šabac and met up with the others later in Ruma. The 2nd Regiment under Major Marisav Petrović crossed the Sava near Obrenovac. The 2nd and 3rd Battalions of the 5th Regiment were still on the ground. When they reached Niš they learned that the Red Army had taken Aleksinac and their way to Belgrade was blocked. The commander of 5th Regiment was forced to change the withdrawal plan and moved across the Raška mountains with the Wehrmacht towards Bosnia. The 1st Battalion of 5th Regiment under Captain Vasa Ogrizović held Zaječar but as soon as the Russians crossed the Danube they moved to Belgrade and crossed the Sava and they became a temporary part of the 4th Regiment. Most troops met each other at Sremska Mitrovica where they awaited trains for transfer to Slovenia.

Meanwhile, major changes in Berlin affected many non-German volunteers fighting with German forces. There was a branch-of-service redistribution by ethnic group, and the Serbian volunteers now found themselves under the authority of the Waffen-SS. The order effecting the transfer was dated 9 November, but not formally recognized until 27 November. At this time the SDK composition on paper was a corps staff, five regiments each with three battalions, a signal company, a mountain supply detachment and German liaison staff. It is important to point out at this time that the SDK's relationship with the Waffen-SS was official, but not on the ground. The troops never wore SS uniforms, and it is doubtful whether the relationship ever went beyond the simple exchange of a limited amount of paperwork. The SDK's situation was quite similar to that of the XV. Kosaken-Kavallerie-Korps, which was also absorbed into the Waffen-SS at about the same time.

As they reached Slovenia the SDK troops concentrated in the area around Ilirska Bistrica and Postojna with command being set up in Ilirska Bistrica. During the settling in period, the 3,000 able-bodied survivors of the SDK were augmented by released Serbian POWs, Chetniks, and members of the Serbian State Guard who had been evacuated to Istria. These new additions brought the unit's strength to approximately 8,000. Lika Chetnik Corps and Slovenian Chetniks called Plava Garda ('Blue Guard') were also present in Slovenia and they also joined the Nationalist front. Nationalist formations in Slovenia numbered about 40,000 armed men in total.

The part of 5th Regiment that withdrew reached Bosnia in mid-November and began to move towards Slovenia. It was during the move north that an event befell the SDK which was to cripple the unit's leadership capability in the coming months. 30 to 40 officers were perfidiously lured to Zagreb, then arrested by the Croatian Ustaše and executed.

SDK's first major action in Slovenia was to take the Partisan-held Kras village of Col on 18 December 1944. From 19 December to the end of the month a major encircle-and-destroy operation was mounted from the garrison towns of Gorizia, Idrija, Postojna and Sežana aiming to eliminate the Partisan stronghold in the Trnovska Mountains. Nearly 5,000 men were used, including 500 from the SDK's 1st Regiment in Postojna, the 10th SS-Police Regiment, Italian R.S.I. troops, Slovenian Domobranci (pro-Nazi Slovenian militia).

The next campaign participated in by the SDK was against Josip Broz Tito's 9th Corps during the first few days of March 1945 and codenamed Ruebezahl. Two combat groups were formed to strike against Partisan concentrations near Lokve. The first group was called 'Zuschneid', and comprised three SS Police Battalions, elements of the 1st Slovenian Domobranci Assault Regiment, two SDK battalions and one Caucasian battalion, with a total force of around 5,000 men. The second group, 'Koestermann', consisted of two battalions of the German 730th Infantry Regiment (710th Inf. Div.), a police company and some engineers, with a total of 2,500 men. The attacking forces pushed forward from a south and west direction, and this time the operation was more successful. The Partisans suffered moderate losses, and the concentration was broken up and dispersed to the northeast.

However, the Partisans quickly regrouped, so the Germans were forced to conduct a supplementary operation (19 March-7 April), which proved to be the final operation against Tito's 9th Corps. Four combat groups were organized along the perimeter of the area now occupied by the Partisans, with the task of bringing the 9th Corps to battle by gradually advancing in unison toward the centre, and thereby reducing the size of the area under their control. This was the standard German method of cleansing a Partisan-controlled area, that never significantly changed during the course of the war.

To the west, along a line Idrija-Rijeka-Grahovo-Podbrdo, Combat Group Blank was assembled with major elements of the 10th and 15th SS-Police Regiments, II./1. SDK Rgt, II./4. SDK Rgt, 21st SS-Police Reconnaissance Co., SS-Police Company 'Schmidt' and an artillery battery from the LXXXXVII Army Corps. This force was later joined on 4 April by the 2nd and 3rd SDK Regiments, and 1,500 men from the Chetnik 502 Lika Corps. The second group, under Police Major Dr Dippelhofer, consisted of the Ljubljana SS NCO School, Slovenian Domobranci, Chetniks and a 1,200-man Russian ROA unit. This group was deployed to the southeast along the line Idrija-Škofja Loka. The northern assault group, 4,500 men from the 13th, 17th and 28th SS-Police Regiments formed up along the road between Podbrdo and Škofja Loka, while a special assault force from the 14th SS Division was concentrated along the north-eastern side of the perimeter.

The area encircled was mountainous, thickly forested, and still deep in winter snow. Once off the few roads that encircle the area, the attacking forces were faced with extremely difficult terrain that limited their progress to a few kilometres each day, inhibited contact with neighbouring units, and greatly restricted the ability to rapidly bring up fresh supplies and heavy weapons. Very soon gaps developed in the line of advance, through which the main body of 9th Corps escaped. Although a number of minor skirmishes were fought, and casualties suffered on both sides, the overall result of the operation was disappointing.

On 27 March, General Damjanović replaced General Mušicki as commander of the Serbian Volunteer Corps and the SDK became a component of Draža Mihailović’s Yugoslav Army in the Homeland, the formal name for the Chetnik forces, although the Corps was still assigned to the HSSuPF Trieste under SS-Gruppenführer Odilo Globocnik. Whether this change affected the SDK's relationship to the Waffen-SS is unknown, but doubtful. Shortly thereafter, Hermann Neubacher, Hitler's special political representative for the Balkans, paid a visit to Ljotić in Trieste to discuss German fears about what would happen when the SDK and Chetnik forces in Istria came into contact with British and American units who were expected to move in that direction from Italy. Ljotić reassured Neubacher of the SDK's loyalty. Meanwhile, Tito's 4th Partisan Army was advancing north along the coastal road from Novi Vinodolski, Croatia to liberate Istria, Trieste and all of central and western Slovenia. German Army Group E immediately issued orders to the LXXXXVII Army Corps to build a perimeter around the port city of Rijeka, to try to block the 4th Army's westward advance. In early April the 237th Infantry Division was rushed to the area, and within a few days defensive positions were established in a 21-kilometre arc to the east and north of the city. The 4th Army began its attack on Rijeka around 20 April with the Partisan 13th, 19th and 43rd Divisions. Although the outnumbered German 237th Infantry Division offered stiff resistance and held its positions, General Kuebler ordered the 188th Reserve Mountain Division to launch an immediate attack on Partisan concentrations in the vicinity of Grobnik Airfield, 16 kilometres north east of Rijeka.

To support this attack, the 2nd, 3rd and 4th SDK Regiments were moved up from the Postojna area. However, the regiments of the Serbian Volunteer Corps arrived too late and never made contact with the 188th Mountain Division. The attack on the airfield was unsuccessful, and by 23 April it was clear to General Kuebler that his Corps was threatened with total encirclement. Kuebler's appreciation of the situation was entirely correct, as on 22 April the general staff of Tito's 4th Army ordered a flanking movement to bypass the city. While the LXXXXVII Corps continued to be pressed by three divisions, the Partisan 20th Division was brought up from Ogulin along with one additional brigade, three tank battalions and two artillery battalions. This force moved to the north, around the German defensive perimeter, and advanced on Trieste via Ilirska Bistrica with the intention of linking up with the Partisan 9th Corps which was pushing south on Trieste.

As the battle for Rijeka moved toward its inevitable conclusion, SDK Regiments 2, 3, and 4 were sent to Ljubljana and transferred to the authority of SS-Obergruppenführer Erwin Rösener, HSSuPF for Carinthia, who had been appointed commander-in-chief of Army Group E's rear area. Rösener's task was to open up and keep open the road and rail routes in northern Slovenia to facilitate the Army Group's withdrawal from Croatia north into Austria. SDK Regiments 1 and 5 remained assigned to Globocnik, who had meanwhile transferred his headquarters from Trieste to Udine, across the Isonzo River in Italy. The SDK was therefore split into two groups, one in central Slovenia under Rösener and moving toward the Austrian border, while the other was in the extreme western part of Slovenia under Globočnik moving toward Italy.

== Surrender and afterwards ==
At about this time, 22 April, Neubacher paid his final visit to Ljotić. A total collapse of German forces in the Balkans and in Italy was recognized as being only a matter of weeks if not days away, and Neubacher wanted to know Ljotić's plans for withdrawing and surrendering the SDK. The next day, during the hours of darkness, Ljotić accidentally drove his car into a hole that had been blown in a bridge by Allied fighter-bombers. His neck was broken and he died shortly thereafter.

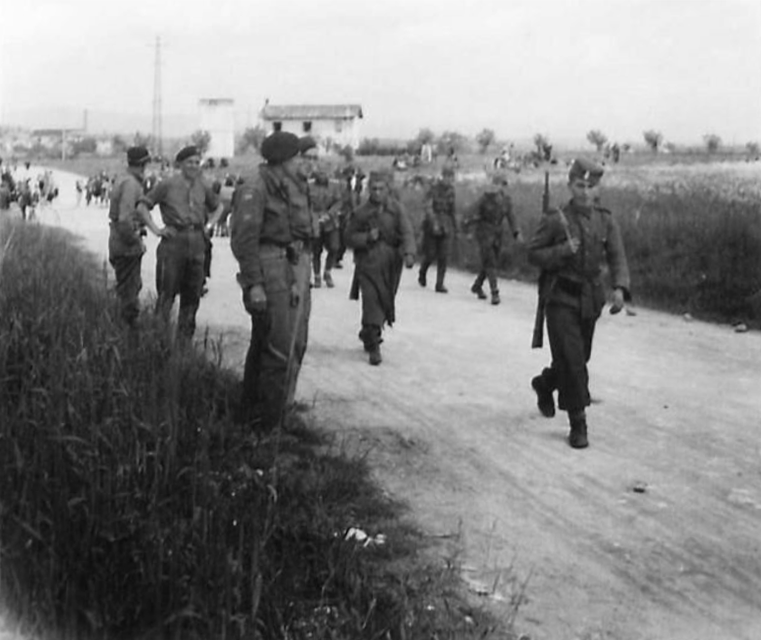
SDK members moving past British troops to their camp in Italy, 1945

On 29 April, as Tito's forces were closing on the Trieste area, General Damjanović issued orders to the 1st and 5th Regiments to cross into Italy, where on 5 May in the town of Palmanova (50 km northwest of Trieste) between 2,400 and 2,800 SDK men surrendered to the British. The men belonging to the other three regiments experienced a less agreeable fate. They moved north from the Ljubljana area into Austria and surrendered to the British at Unterbergen on the Drava River on 12 May 1945. 20 days later these 2,418 men were turned over to Tito's Partisans. Yugoslav leadership decided to execute all SDK members older than 20. Some were executed almost immediately in the Kočevski Rog massacre, while the others were carted off along with 10,000 Slovenian Domobranci to the infamous Šentvid camp, near Ljubljana. Subsequently, these too were executed. Historian Milan Radanović estimates that between 2,100 and 2,300 SDK members were executed in May 1945 in total. The group that surrendered in Italy was eventually transported to a camp at Münster, Germany, where they were released in July, 1947. These men made their way to various countries around the world, including the United States. General Mušicki was arrested by the Allied authorities, returned to Yugoslavia, and executed in 1946 as a result of sentences passed at the same war crimes trial that pronounced the death sentence on Draža Mihailović and a number of others.

Dimitrije Ljotic’s son Nikola, who was the last surviving officer of the unit passed away at age 101 in Chicago in 2023.

== Ranks ==
=== Enlisted and NCOs ===
- Private (Dobrovoljac) (Literally, "Volunteer.")
- Corporal (Kaplar)
- Sergeant (Podnarednik)
- Staff Sergeant (Narednik)
- Sergeant Major (Narednik vodnik)

=== Officers ===
- 2nd Lieutenant (Potporučnik)
- 1st Lieutenant (Poručnik)
- Captain (Kapetan)
- Major (Major)
- Lieutenant Colonel (Potpukovnik)
- Colonel (Pukovnik)
- Brigadier General (Brigadni Đeneral)

== Order of battle ==
=== Order of Battle (January 1943) ===
- 1. Battalion
  - 3 x Companies
- 2. Battalion
  - 3 x Companies
- 3. Battalion
  - 3 x Companies
- 4. Battalion
  - 3 x Companies
- 5. Battalion
  - 3 x Companies

=== Order of Battle (1944) ===
- 1. Regiment
  - 3 x Battalions
- 2. Regiment
  - 3 x Battalions
- 3. Regiment
  - 3 x Battalions
- 4. Regiment

== See also ==
- World War II in Yugoslavia
- Invasion of Yugoslavia
- Seven anti-partisan offensives
- Anti-partisan operations in World War II
- AVNOJ
- Croatian Home Guard (World War II)
