= Miranovačka Kula =

Miranovačka Kula Мирановачка Кула
- Village
- Location within Serbia
- Coordinates: 43°21′32″N 22°21′00″E
- Country: Serbia
- Region: Southern and Eastern Serbia
- District: Pirot
- Municipality: Bela Palanka

Population (2002)
  - Total: 17
- Time zone: UTC+1 (CET)
  - Summer (DST): UTC+2 (CEST)

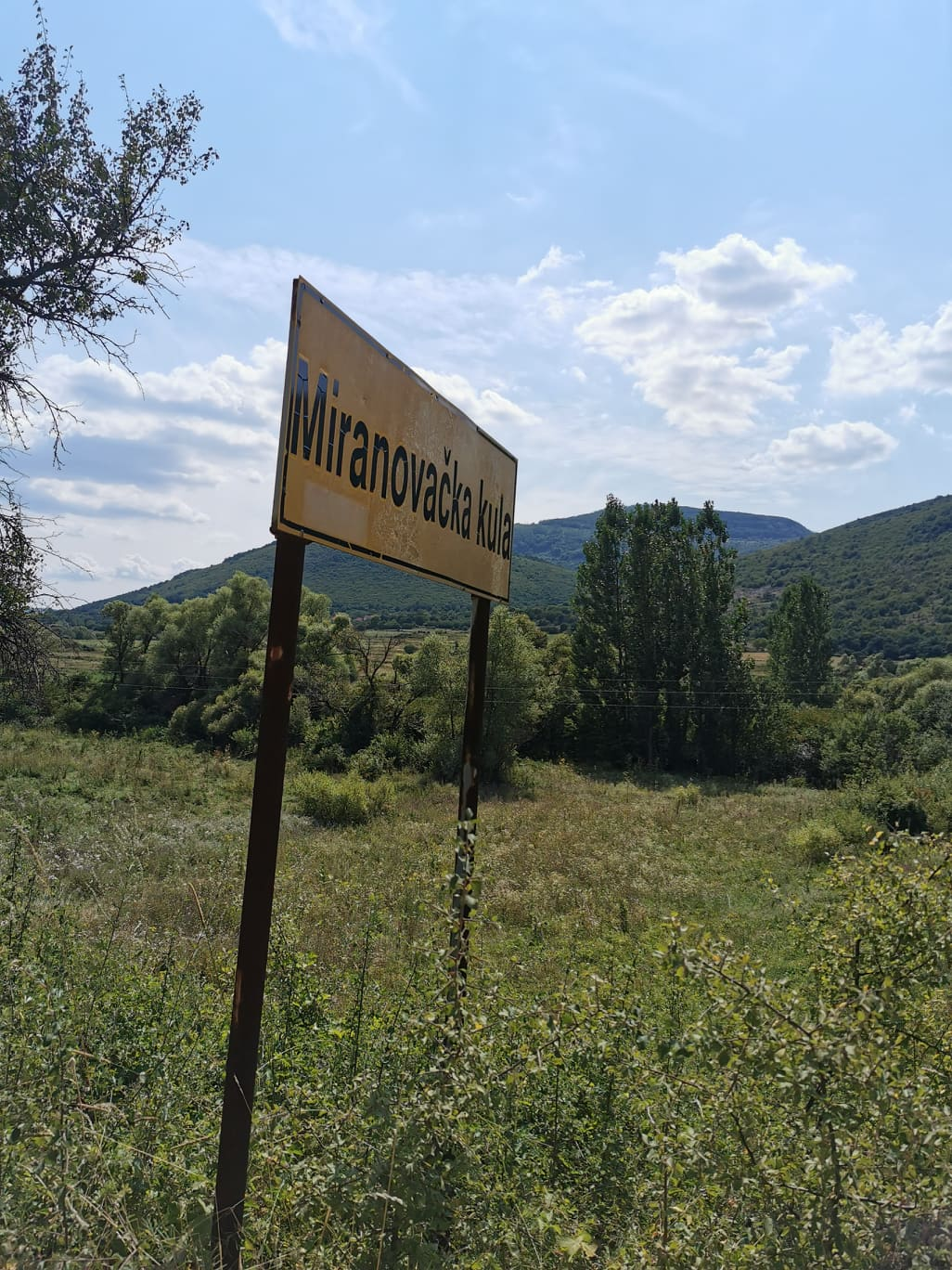
Miranovačka kula Bela Palanka

Miranovačka Kula (Serbian Cyrillic: Мирановачка Кула) is a village in the municipality of Bela Palanka, Serbia. According to the 2002 census, the village has a population of 17 people. The main industry is agriculture, including wool production.
