= Vladislav Krsmanovic =

Vladislav Krsmanović (born 25 November 1965 in Ub, Yugoslavia) is the Mayor of Municipality of Ub in Serbia.

Krsmanović graduated his elementary and high school in Ub.

He graduated from the Belgrade University Economics Faculty.

In early '90s worked at various jobs, and the first job in the profession began in the Taxation Office of Ub in 1996. In year 2000. moves to the position of financial director of manufacturing non-metallic materials, "Kopovi" - Ub.

After the successful privatization of the company, he went to Belgrade to work as the financial manager in "Dunav tourists", which had in its possession hotels "Yugoslavia", "Metropol", "Danube" on Mt. Zlatibor . After the sale of Belgrade hotels, takes the place of the executive director of the "Dunav cars" in the company" Dunav insurance ".

Krsmanović became president of the Municipality at the end of June 2008. year. In the political life of Ub, Vladislav is present from the beginning of the nineties. He is a member of the Democratic Party.

Lives with his family (wife and son) in Ub. Mr Krsmanović is member of Democratic Party and vice-president of the party's Municipal council.
