= Radovan Jovanović =

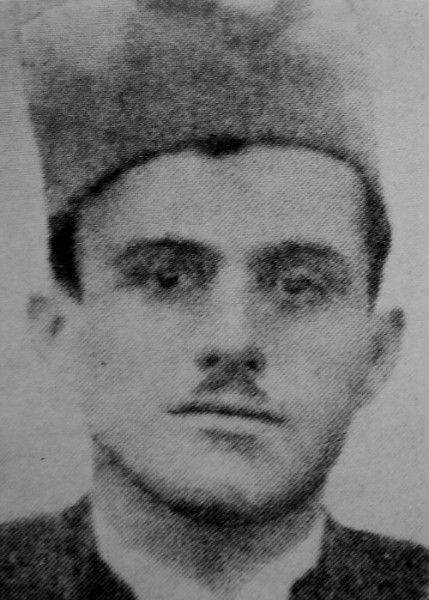
Image of Rade Jovanović Radovan

Radovan Jovanović (Cyrillic: Раде Јовановић; Parcani, Sopot, 1904 - Slatina, Sopot, 25 September 1941) was a Serbian communist partisan. He was elevated to a National Hero of Yugoslavia in 1951.
