= Parcani (Sopot) =

Coordinates: 44°34′N 20°31′E

Parcani (Sopot) (Serbia)

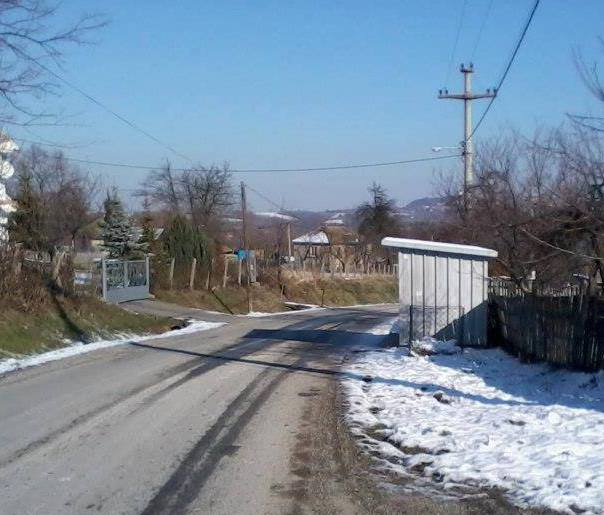
Street of Parcani

Parcani (Serbian Cyrillic: Парцани) is a village in Sopot municipality that belongs to the City of Belgrade. According to last census in 2022 there are 533 inhabitants.

== Notable residents ==
- Radovan Jovanović
