= Branko Krsmanović =

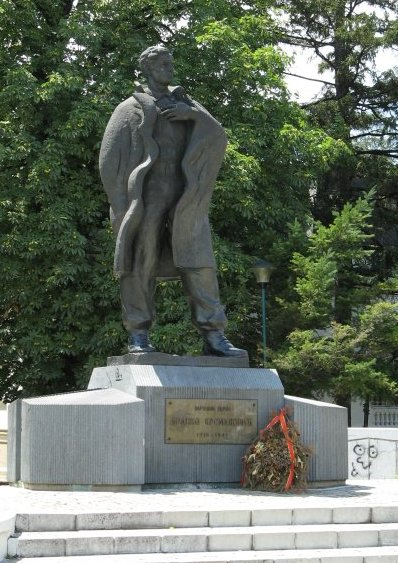

Branko Krsmanović (1915–1941) was a participant in the Spanish Civil War and the National Liberation struggle and national hero of Yugoslavia.
