= Commissioner Government =

Puppet administration of Serbia in World War II

Puppet government overview
- Formed: 27 April – 1 May 1941
- Dissolved: 29 August 1941
- Jurisdiction: German occupied territory of Serbia
- Headquarters: Belgrade
- Minister responsible: Milan Aćimović

The Commissioner Government (Serbian: Комесарска влада, Komesarska vlada) was a short-lived Serbian collaborationist puppet government established in the German-occupied territory of Serbia within the Axis-partitioned Kingdom of Yugoslavia during World War II. It operated from 30 April to 29 August 1941, was headed by Milan Aćimović, and is also referred to as the Commissars Government or Council of Commissars. Of the ten commissioners, four had previously been ministers in various Yugoslav governments, and two had been assistant ministers. The members were pro-German, antisemitic and anti-communist, and believed that Germany would win the war. The Aćimović government lacked any semblance of power, and was merely an instrument of the German occupation regime, carrying out its orders within the occupied territory. Under the overall control of the German Military Commander in Serbia, supervision of its day-to-day operations was the responsibility of the chief of the German administrative staff, SS-Brigadeführer and State Councillor Harald Turner. One of its early tasks was the implementation of German orders regarding the registration of Jews and Romani people living in the territory, and the placing of severe restrictions on their liberty.

In early July, a few days after a communist-led mass uprising commenced, Aćimović reshuffled his government, replacing three commissioners and appointing deputies for most of the portfolios. By mid-July, the Germans had decided that the Aćimović regime was incompetent and unable to deal with the uprising, and began looking for a replacement. This resulted in the resignation of the Commissioner Government at the end of August, and the appointment of the Government of National Salvation led by former Minister of the Army and Navy, Armijski đeneral (Note: Equivalent to a U.S. Army lieutenant general.) Milan Nedić, in which Aćimović initially retained the interior portfolio. The members of the Commissioner Government collaborated with the occupiers as a means to spare Serbs from political influences that they considered more dangerous than the Germans, such as democracy, communism and multiculturalism. They actively assisted the Germans in exploiting the population and the economy, and took an "extremely opportunistic" view of the Jewish question, regarding their own participation in the Holocaust as "unpleasant but unavoidable". There is no evidence that the collaboration of the Commissioner Government moderated German occupation policies in any way.

== Background ==
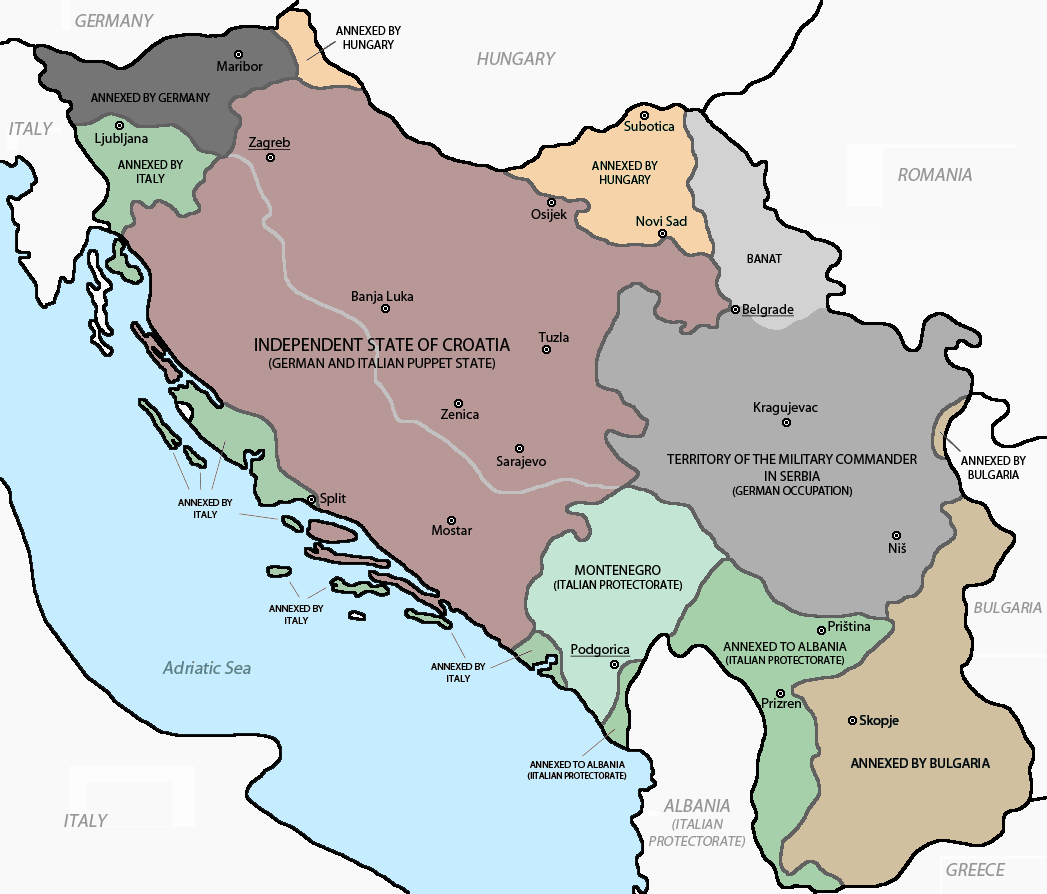
The partition of Yugoslavia by the Axis powers

In April 1941, the Kingdom of Yugoslavia was invaded and quickly defeated by the Axis powers. Yugoslavia was partitioned, and as part of this, the Germans established a military government of occupation in an area roughly the same as the pre-1912 Kingdom of Serbia, consisting of Serbia proper, the northern part of Kosovo (around Kosovska Mitrovica), and the Banat. The Germans did this to secure two strategic lines of communication – the Danube river, and the railway line that connected Belgrade with Salonika in occupied Greece, and thence by sea to North Africa. The German occupied territory of Serbia was also rich in non-ferrous metals such as lead, antimony and copper, which Germany needed to support its war effort.

Even before the Yugoslav surrender on 17 April, the German Army High Command (German: Oberkommando des Heeres, or OKH) had issued a proclamation to the population under German occupation which included severe penalties for acts of violence and sabotage; the surrender of military firearms and radio transmitters; a list of acts punishable according to military law, including unauthorised public meetings; the continuation of the operation of government agencies including police, businesses and schools; prohibition of hoarding; fixing of prices and wages; and the use of occupation currency. The exact boundaries of the occupied territory had been fixed in a directive issued by Adolf Hitler on 12 April 1941, which also directed the creation of the military administration. This directive was followed up on 20 April 1941 by orders issued by the Chief of the OKH which established the Military Commander in Serbia as the head of the occupation regime, responsible to the Quartermaster-General of the OKH. In the interim, the staff for the military government had been assembled in Germany and the duties of the Military Commander in Serbia had been detailed. These included safeguarding the lines of communication, executing the economic orders issued by Reichsmarschall Hermann Göring, and establishing and maintaining peace and order. In the short-term, he was also responsible for guarding the huge numbers of Yugoslav prisoners of war, and safeguarding captured weapons and munitions.

The military commander's staff was divided into military and administrative branches. He was allocated personnel to form four area commands and about ten district commands, which reported to the chief of the administrative staff, and the military staff allocated the troops of the four local defence battalions across the area commands. The first military commander in the occupied territory was General der Flieger (Note: Equivalent to a U.S. Army lieutenant general) Helmuth Förster, a Luftwaffe officer, appointed on 20 April 1941, assisted by the chief of his administrative staff, SS-Brigadeführer (Note: Equivalent to a U.S. Army brigadier general) and State Councillor Harald Turner. Other than military commander's staff, there were several senior figures in Belgrade who represented key non-military arms of the German government. Prominent among these was NSFK-Obergruppenführer (Note: Equivalent to a U.S. Army general) Franz Neuhausen, who had been initially appointed by Göring as plenipotentiary general for economic affairs in the territory on 17 April. A further key figure in the initial German administration was SS-Standartenführer (Note: Equivalent to a U.S. Army colonel) Wilhelm Fuchs, who commanded Einsatzgruppe Serbia, which consisted of Sicherheitsdienst (Security Service, or SD) and Sicherheitspolizei (Security Police, or SiPo), and Geheime Staatspolizei (Secret State Police, or Gestapo) detachments, and controlled the 64th Reserve Police Battalion of the Ordnungspolizei (Order Police, or Orpo). While he was formally responsible to Turner, Fuchs also reported directly to his superiors in Berlin.

Despite these organs of military occupation, and the orders issued by OKH, regulating as they did a wide range of administrative, political, economic, cultural and social matters, the Germans still needed to establish a public administrative body that would implement their directives. It was decided to form a puppet government for that purpose.

== Establishment ==
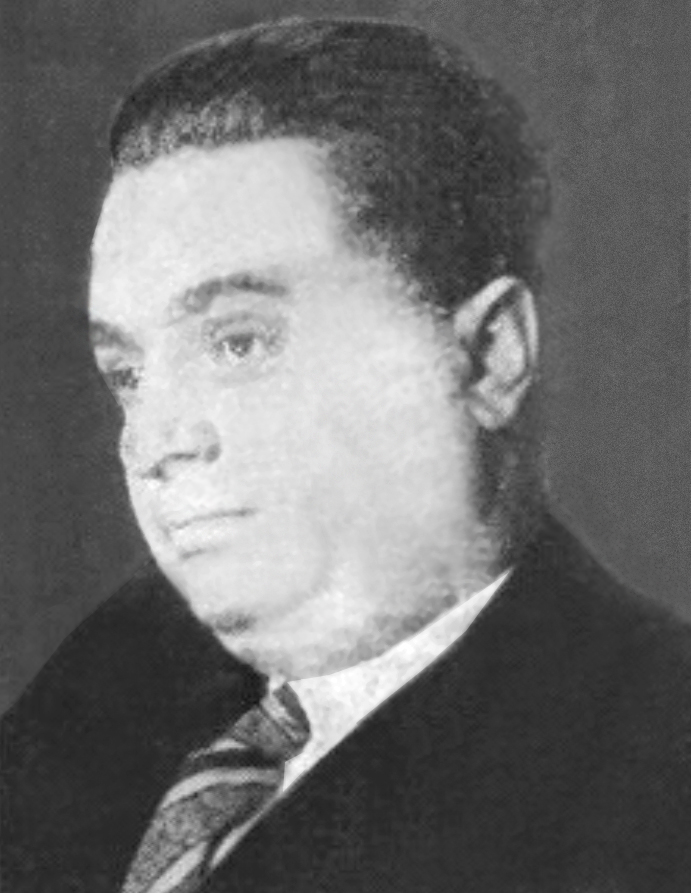
Milan Aćimović was selected to lead the collaborationist regime.

A search began for a suitable Serb to lead a collaborationist regime. From the date of the Yugoslav capitulation, pro-German politicians, including the president of the fascist Zbor movement, Dimitrije Ljotić, former Belgrade police chief and Minister of the Interior, Milan Aćimović, the current Belgrade police chief, Dragomir Jovanović, along with Đorđe Perić, Steven Klujić and Tanasije Dinić met almost daily to assist in this process. The Germans would have preferred the pro-Axis former prime minister, Milan Stojadinović, but he had been sent into exile before the coup. Several high-profile men were considered by the Germans, including former Prime Minister Dragiša Cvetković, former Foreign Minister Aleksandar Cincar-Marković, Aćimović, Ljotić, and Jovanović.

Hitler preferred someone who was both flexible and had some local popularity to lead a puppet government in German-occupied Serbia. The Germans passed over Ljotić as they believed that he had a "dubious reputation among Serbs". Cincar-Marković did not want to be part of a collaborationist administration. He was also in poor health. Cvetković was suspected of being pro-British and harbouring sympathies towards Freemasonry. He was also believed to have had Roma ancestry, which the Germans deemed unacceptable. Aćimović, a virulent anti-communist, had been in close contact with the German police and security services before the war. This included being appointed deputy to the German head of Interpol, Reinhard Heydrich, who was also the chief of the SD. Aćimović was also in close contact with the head of the Gestapo, Heinrich Müller.

Förster decided on Aćimović, who in early 1939 had briefly been Minister of the Interior in Stojadinović's pro-Axis government. With Förster's approval, he formed his Commissioner Government between 27 April and 1 May, (Note: According to Tomasevich, the government was formed on 30 May. This is contradicted by Prusin, who states that it was formed on 27 April, Cohen and Milosavljević who state it was 30 April, and Pavlowitch who states it was 1 May.) consisting of ten commissioners. Some sources refer to it as the Commissars Government, or Council of Commissars.

The other nine commissioners were Risto Jojić, Dušan Letica, Dušan Pantić, Momčilo Janković, Milisav Vasiljević, Lazo M. Kostić, Stevan Ivanić, Stanislav Josifović and Jevrem Protić; each commissioner ran one of the former Yugoslav ministries, except for the Ministry of Army and Navy, and the Ministry of Foreign Affairs, which had been abolished. According to the author Philip J. Cohen, Aćimović, Vasiljević and Ivanić were German agents prior to the invasion of Yugoslavia. In addition to being vehemently pro-German and antisemitic, the commissioners were also strongly anti-communist, and believed that Germany would win the war. They represented a wide spectrum of pre-war Serbian political parties: Vasiljević and Ivanić both had close links to Zbor; Pantić, Kostić and Protić being members of the centre-right People's Radical Party; and Josifović was a member of the Democratic Party. No representatives of the outlawed Communist Party or the British-backed Serbian Agrarian Party were included.

The new administration was experienced; like Aćimović, Jojić, Letica and Pantić had all served as ministers in various cabinets, Josifović and Protić had been assistant ministers, Kostić was a university professor, and others were experts in their respective fields. Aćimović maintained the existing Yugoslav government apparatus and staff, recalling personnel to their duties, and former Yugoslav officials played important roles in the administration. Despite the fact that Serbs dominated government positions in interwar Yugoslavia, there were some non-Serb officials in Belgrade, those who left the occupied territory had to be replaced, and most Serbian officials known or suspected to be anti-German either resigned or were removed. The administration manifested German intentions to make best use of those who were willing to collaborate and save the available German administrative staff for higher priority work.

Composition of the first Commissioner Government
Ministry	Commissioner
Head of the Council of Commissioners; Interior	Milan Aćimović
Education	Risto Jojić
Finance	Dušan Letica
Post and Telegraph	Dušan Pantić
Ministry of Justice	Momčilo Janković
National Economy	Milosav Vasiljević
Transport	Lazo M. Kostić
Social Policy	Stevan Ivanić
Construction	Stanislav Josifović
Agriculture	Jeremija Protić

== Operation ==
=== Initial tasks ===
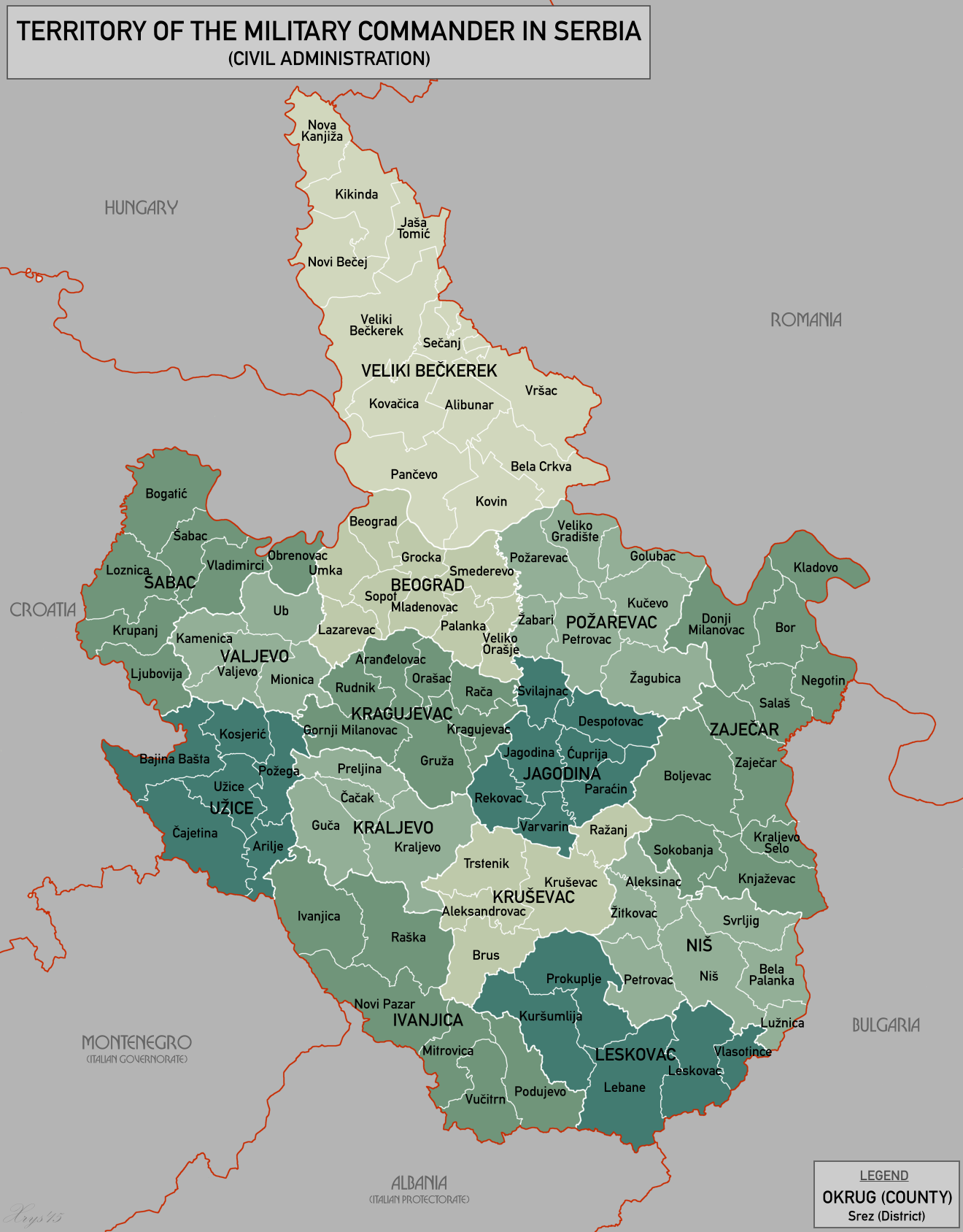
Map showing the counties and districts of the occupied territory

During May, the earlier proclamation of the OKH was followed by orders issued by Förster, requiring the registration of printing presses and imposing restrictions on the press within the occupied territory. Orders were also issued regarding the operation of theatres and other places of entertainment, and imposing German criminal law in the occupied territory. Förster also ordered the resumption of production, disestablished the National Bank of the Kingdom of Yugoslavia, and established the Serbian National Bank to replace it. From the outset, the Aćimović government lacked any semblance of power. It was effectively a low-grade and basic instrument of the German military occupation regime, which performed administrative duties within the occupied territory on behalf of the Germans. The three main tasks of the Aćimović administration were to secure the acquiescence of the population to the German occupation, help restore services, and "identify and remove undesirables from public services". This included Jews, Roma and "unreliable" Serbs.

The Commissioner Government was capable of handling routine administrative tasks and maintaining law and order in a peacetime situation only, and was closely controlled by Turner and Neuhausen. Neuhausen was effectively an economic dictator, and had complete control over the economy of the occupied territory and finances of the puppet administration, to one end – maximising the contribution they made to the German war effort. This was demonstrated in the fixing of wages and prices; officially the responsibility of Letica's finance department, they were actually set by Neuhausen's staff. Also in May, Förster ordered the Aćimović administration to investigate the causes of the invasion. The inquiry concluded that the Yugoslav government had "recklessly brushed off the peaceful intentions of the Third Reich and provoked the war".

One of the first tasks of the administration involved carrying out Turner's orders for the registration of all Jews and Romani people in the occupied territory and implementation of severe restrictions on their activities. These were aimed at bringing the occupied territory into line with the rest of Nazi-occupied Europe, and included the wearing of yellow armbands, the introduction of forced labour and curfews, and restricted access to food. Turner explicitly stated that "[t]he Serbian Authorities [ie the Commissioner Government] are responsible for the implementation of all measures contained in the order". By this means, the Commissioner Government took part, albeit under German orders, in the "registration, marking, pauperisation, and social exclusion of the Jewish community". Aćimović's Interior Ministry included a section dedicated to implementing anti-Jewish and anti-Roma laws, but the primary means for the carrying out of such tasks was the 3,000-strong Serbian gendarmerie, which was based on elements of the former Yugoslav gendarmerie units remaining in the territory, the Drinski and Dunavski regiments. It had been formed on 17 April on Förster's orders, and its acting head was Colonel Jovan Trišić. The gendarmerie was also responsible for collecting taxes and overseeing the harvest, and was therefore unpopular, particularly with the rural population. German concerns about the reliability of the gendarmerie meant that it was never adequately armed or equipped for its tasks.

The makeup of the puppet administration, with representation from a number of different political parties, meant that the Germans had no concerns about it developing a unified front that might hamper German efforts to pacify the territory and exploit it economically. Its very limited powers were further eroded by constant German interference in its operations, and the requirement that all laws drafted by the commissioners could only be implemented after their approval by the Germans. The overall German approach to Aćimović and his administration was uneven, as Turner and the plenipotentiary of the Foreign Office, Felix Benzler, both pushed for co-operation and accommodation with Aćimović, while Förster and Fuchs considered the puppet government to be a mere supplement to the German military administration that included a police function. When Aćimović requested the release of Serb POWs, arguing that the camps could become hotbeds of nationalist and communist agitation, and that the men were needed as labourers, Förster flatly refused and deported them to Germany. In mid-May, Aćimović's administration issued a declaration to the effect that the Serbian people wanted "sincere and loyal cooperation with their great neighbour, the German people". Most of the local administrators in the counties and districts remained in place, and the German military administration placed its own administrators at each level to supervise the local authorities. The boundaries of the occupied territory were settled on 21 May, with 51,000 square kilometres (20,000 sq mi) of land and 3.81 million inhabitants, including between 50 and 60 per cent of Yugoslav Serbs.

Soon after the Aćimović government was appointed, refugees escaping persecution in the neighbouring Independent State of Croatia (NDH), and others fleeing Bulgarian-annexed Macedonia, Albanian-annexed western Macedonia and Kosovo, and Hungarian-occupied Bačka and Baranja began to flood into the territory.

=== Occupation troops ===
Förster was subsequently transferred, and on 2 June was succeeded by General der Flakartillerie (Note: Equivalent to a U.S. Army lieutenant general) Ludwig von Schröder, another Luftwaffe officer. On 9 June, the commander of the German 12th Army, Generalfeldmarschall (Note: Equivalent to a U.S. Army general) Wilhelm List, was appointed as the Wehrmacht Commander-in-Chief Southeast Europe, with Schröder reporting directly to him. From his headquarters in Belgrade, Schröder directly controlled four poorly-equipped local defence (German: Landesschützen) battalions, consisting of older men. These occupation forces were supplemented by a range of force elements, including the 64th Reserve Police Battalion of the Orpo, an engineer regiment consisting of a pioneer battalion, a bridging column and a construction battalion, and several military police units, comprising a Feldgendarmerie (military police) company, a Geheime Feldpolizei (secret field police) group, and a prisoner of war processing unit. The occupation force was also supported by a military hospital and ambulances, veterinary hospital and ambulances, general transport column, and logistic units. Turner was responsible for the staffing of the four area commands and nine district commands in the occupied territory.

In addition to the occupation troops directly commanded by Schröder, in June the Wehrmacht deployed the headquarters of the LXV Corps zbV (Note: zbV is an abbreviation for the German language term zur besonderen Verwendung, generally translated as "for special employment") to Belgrade to command four poorly equipped occupation divisions, under the control of General der Artillerie (Note: Equivalent to a U.S. Army lieutenant general) Paul Bader. Three divisions were deployed in the occupied territory, and the fourth was deployed in the adjacent parts of the NDH. The three divisions had been transported to the occupied territory between 7 and 24 May, and were initially tasked with guarding the key railway lines to Bulgaria and Greece. By late June, Bader's headquarters had been established in Belgrade, and the three divisions in the occupied territory were deployed with headquarters at Valjevo in the west, Topola roughly in the centre of the territory, and Niš in the south. The status of Bader's command was that Schröder could order him to undertake operations against rebels, but he could not otherwise act as Bader's superior.

=== The Banat ===
In late June, the Aćimović administration issued an ordinance regarding the administration of the Banat which essentially made the region a separate civil administrative unit under the control of the local Volksdeutsche led by Sepp Janko. While the Banat was formally under the jurisdiction of the Aćimović administration, in practical terms it was largely autonomous of Belgrade and under the direction of the military government through the military area command in Pančevo.

=== Uprising ===
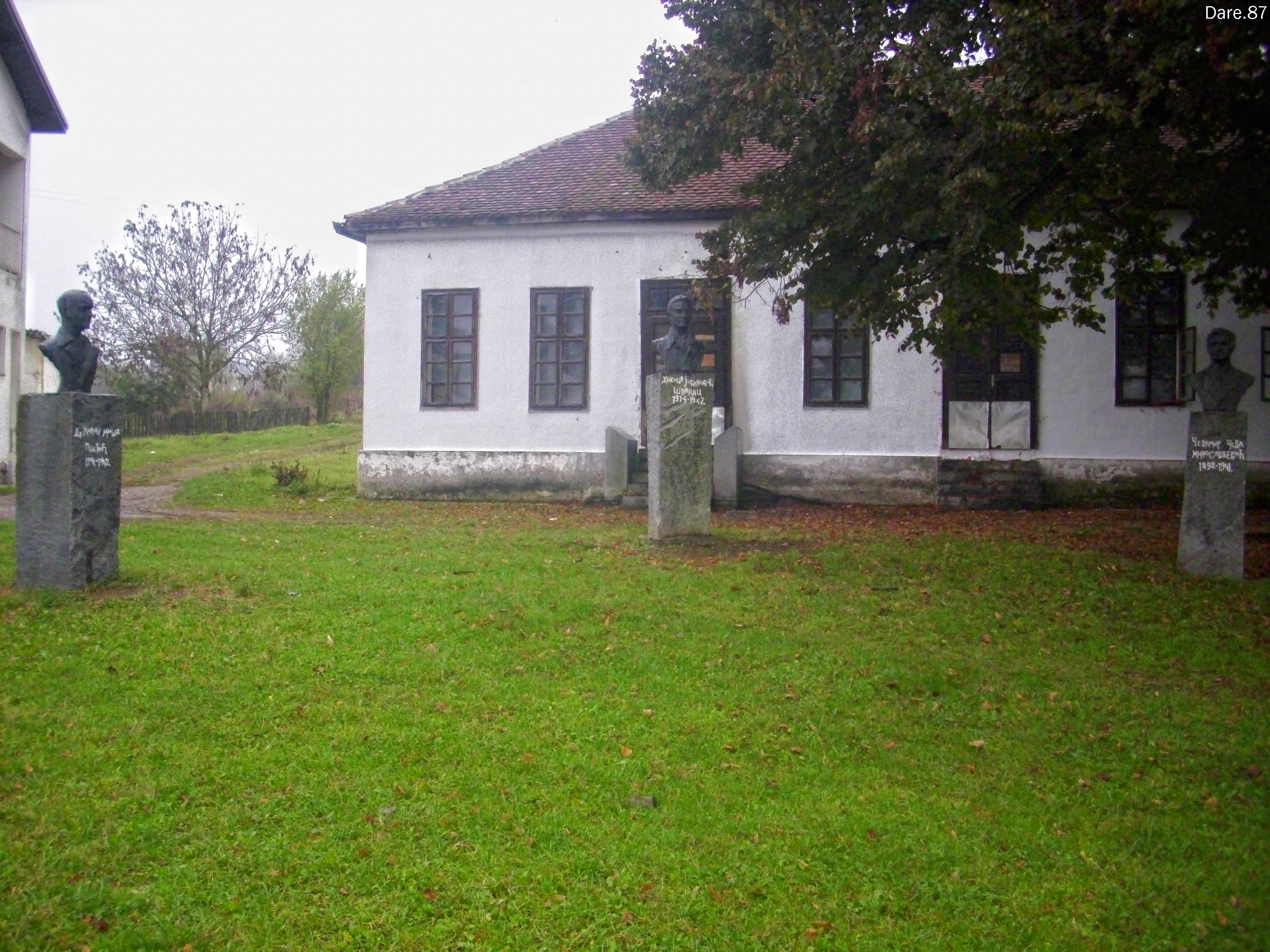
The village of Bela Crkva, where fighting against the occupiers and the Aćimović administration began on 7 July

During June, the Aćimović government, preoccupied as it was with dreams of expanding the occupied territory into a Greater Serbia, wrote to Schröder urging him "to give the Serbian people its centuries-old ethnographic borders". In early July 1941, shortly after the launching of Operation Barbarossa against the Soviet Union, armed resistance began against both the Germans and the Aćimović authorities. This was a response to appeals from both Joseph Stalin and the Communist International for communist organisations across occupied Europe to draw German troops away from the Eastern Front, and followed a meeting of the Central Committee of the Yugoslav Communist Party in Belgrade on 4 July. This meeting resolved to shift from sabotage operations to a general uprising, form Partisan detachments of fighters and commence armed resistance, and call for the populace to rise up against the occupiers throughout Yugoslavia. This also coincided with the departure of the last of the German invasion force that had remained to oversee the transition to occupation. From the appearance of posters and pamphlets urging the population to undertake sabotage, it rapidly turned to attempted and actual sabotage of German propaganda facilities and railway and telephone lines. The first fighting occurred at the village of Bela Crkva on 7 July when two gendarmes were killed during an attempt to disperse a public meeting. At the end of the first week in July, List requested that the Luftwaffe transfer an aircraft training school to the territory, as operational units were not available. Soon after, gendarmerie stations and patrols were being attacked, and German vehicles were fired upon. Armed groups first appeared in the Aranđelovac district, northwest of Topola.

=== Reshuffle ===
Three days after the outbreak of the rebellion, Aćimović reshuffled his council. Jojić, Kostić and Protić were replaced, and deputy commissioners were appointed for all portfolios except construction and agriculture. Among the new members was Perić, another Zbor member.

Composition of the second Commissioner Government
Ministry	Commissioner	Deputy
Head of the Council of Commissioners; Ministry of the Interior	Milan Aćimović	Tanasije Dinić Đorđe Perić
Education	Velibor Jonić	Vladimir Velmar-Janković
Finance	Dušan Letica	Milan Horvatski
Post and Telegraph	Dušan Pantić	Milorad Dimitrijević
Justice	Momčilo Janković	Đura Kotur
National Economy	Milosav Vasiljević	Dr. Mihajlović
Transport	Ranisav Avramović	Nikola Đurić
Social Policy	Stevan Ivanić	Darko Petrović
Construction	Stanislav Josifović	—
Agriculture	Budimir Cvijanović	—

=== Resistance increases ===
Within a few weeks of its outbreak, the uprising in the occupied territory had reached mass proportions. Between 1 July and 15 August, the rebels carried out 246 attacks against government representatives and facilities, killing 26 functionaries, wounding 11 and capturing 10. In the same period, the Serbian gendarmerie reported killing 82 rebels, wounding 14 and capturing 47. To bolster its reputation with the Germans, the Aćimović government arranged public meetings and conferences to encourage collaboration by the populace, with the purported aim of saving the occupied territory from civil war. Such a conference was addressed by Vasiljević and Avramović in mid-July, but ongoing German reprisal killings undermined their message. In late July, Schröder died after being injured in an aircraft accident. The new German Military Commander in Serbia, Luftwaffe General der Flieger Heinrich Danckelmann, was unable to obtain more German troops or police to suppress the revolt due to the needs of the Eastern Front. In this context, Turner suggested that Danckelmann strengthen the Aćimović administration so that it might subdue the rebellion on its own.

On 29 July, in reprisal for an arson attack on German transport in Belgrade by a 16-year-old Jewish boy, Einsatzgruppe Serbia executed 100 Jews and 22 communists. On 1 August, Benzler wrote that despite the goodwill of the Aćimović administration towards the German occupiers, the puppet government was "weak and unstable". By August, around 100,000 Serbs had crossed into the occupied territory from the NDH, fleeing Ustaše persecution. They were joined by more than 37,000 refugees from Hungarian-annexed Bačka and Baranja, and 20,000 from Bulgarian-annexed Macedonia. On 13 August, Bader reneged on Danckelmann's pledge to allow the Commissioner Government to maintain control of the Serbian gendarmerie, and ordered that it be re-organised into units of 50–100 men under the direction of local German commanders. He also directed the three divisional commanders to have their battalions form Jagdkommandos, lightly armed and mobile "hunter teams", incorporating elements of Einsatzgruppe Serbia and the gendarmerie.

In response to the revolt, the Aćimović administration encouraged 545 or 546 prominent and influential Serbs to sign the Appeal to the Serbian Nation, which was published in the German-authorised Belgrade daily newspaper Novo vreme on 13 and 14 August. (Note: Cohen lists the names of 546 signatories, drawn from a book published by the former editor of Novo vreme in 1963 (Krakov 1963, pp. 105–113), which included the entire Appeal and list of signatories. Professor Jovan Byford also writes that there were 546 signatories, while Ramet mentions 545, and Prusin states "about five hundred". Tomasevich and Pavlowitch mention a much lower figure of 307 signatories.) Signatories included three Serbian Orthodox bishops, four archpriests, and at least 81 professors from the University of Belgrade. According to the historian Stevan K. Pavlowitch, many of the signatories were placed under pressure to sign. Professor Jozo Tomasevich notes that many were known for their leftist views. The appeal called upon the Serbian population to help the authorities in every way in their struggle against the communist rebels, and called for loyalty to the Germans, condemning the Partisan-led resistance as unpatriotic. The Serbian Bar Association unanimously supported the Appeal, but some notable personalities, such as the writers Isidora Sekulić and Ivo Andrić and university professor Miloš N. Đurić, refused to sign. The Aćimović administration also appealed for rebels to return to their homes and announced bounties for the killing of rebels and their leaders. In addition, Aćimović gave orders that the wives of communists and their sons older than 16 years of age be arrested and held, and the Germans burned their houses and imposed curfews.

== Replacement ==
The German occupation authorities considered Aćimović and his administration incompetent due to their failure to suppress the uprising, and had been considering sacking Aćimović since mid-July. To strengthen the puppet government, Danckelmann wanted to find a Serb who was both well-known and highly regarded by the population who could raise some sort of Serbian armed force and who would be willing to use it ruthlessly against the rebels whilst remaining under full German control. In response to a request from Benzler, the Foreign Office sent SS-Standartenführer Edmund Veesenmayer to provide assistance in establishing a new puppet government that would meet German requirements. Five months earlier, Veesenmayer had engineered the proclamation of the NDH. Veesenmayer engaged in a series of consultations with German commanders and officials in Belgrade, interviewed a number of possible candidates to lead the new puppet government, then selected former Yugoslav Minister of the Army and Navy Armijski đeneral (Note: Equivalent to a U.S. Army lieutenant general.) Milan Nedić as the best available. The Germans had to apply significant pressure to Nedić to encourage him to accept the position, including threats to bring Bulgarian and Hungarian troops into the occupied territory and to send him to Germany as a prisoner of war. Unlike most Yugoslav generals, Nedić had not been interned in Germany after the capitulation, but instead had been placed under house arrest in Belgrade.

On 27 August 1941, about 75 prominent Serbs convened a meeting in Belgrade where they resolved that Nedić should form a Government of National Salvation to replace the Commissioner Government. The same day, Nedić wrote to Danckelmann agreeing to become the Prime Minister of the new government on the basis of five conditions and some additional concessions. Two days later, the German authorities appointed Nedić and his government. Real power continued to reside with the occupiers. Aćimović initially retained his position as Minister of the Interior, but was replaced in November 1942. In March 1945, he joined a Chetnik group in the NDH, and was killed battling the Partisans.

== Analysis ==
Apart from the Zbor activists, some members of the Commissioner Government may appear on face value to have been compliant bureaucrats with few ideological convictions. The historian Alexander Prusin asserts that on closer examination, they accepted collaboration with the occupiers as a means to spare Serbs from political influences that they considered more dangerous than the Germans: democracy, communism, and multiculturalism. He observes that despite their extremely limited powers, they actively assisted the Germans in exploiting the population and the economy, and also took an "extremely opportunistic" view of the Jewish question, regarding their own participation in the Holocaust as "unpleasant but unavoidable". Despite the claims of post-war apologists, Prusin concludes that there is no evidence that the collaboration of bodies like the Commissioner Government moderated German policies in any way, as the Germans carried out reprisal killings, exploitation of the economy and other harsh actions without regard for the views of the puppet administration.

In post-war communist Yugoslavia, Aćimović was referred to as a traitor, but since the fall of Slobodan Milošević in the late 1990s there have been gradual moves to rehabilitate members of the Serbian collaborationist puppet governments on the basis of their anti-communism.
