= August Meyszner =

Austrian police officer, SS officer and Nazi politician (1886–1947)

August von Meyszner
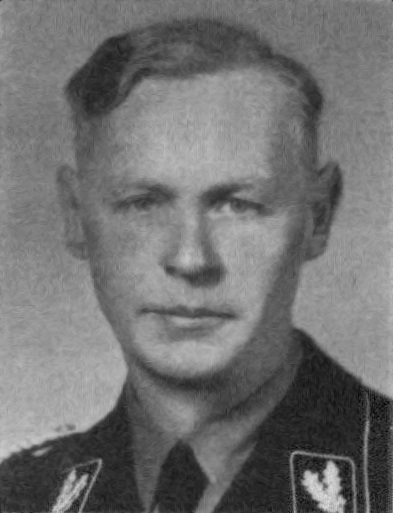
- Meyszner in 1938
- Born: August Edler von Meyszner; 3 August 1886; Graz, Styria, Austria-Hungary
- Died: 24 January 1947 (aged 60); Belgrade, PR Serbia, FPR Yugoslavia
- Cause of death: Execution by hanging
- Spouse: Pia (née Gostischa)
- Military career
- Allegiance: Austria-Hungary; Austria; Nazi Germany
- Branch: Austrian Gendarmerie; Ordnungspolizei; Allgemeine SS
- Service years: 1906–1945
- Rank: SS-Gruppenführer and Generalleutnant of Police
- Commands: Higher SS and Police Leader, German-occupied territory of Serbia (1942–44)
- Awards: Iron Cross 1st Class; War Merit Cross 1st Class with Swords

August Edler von Meyszner (3 August 1886 – 24 January 1947) was an Austrian Gendarmerie officer, right-wing politician, and senior Ordnungspolizei (order police) officer who held the post of Higher SS and Police Leader in the German-occupied territory of Serbia from January 1942 to March 1944, during World War II. He has been described as one of Heinrich Himmler's most brutal subordinates.

Meyszner began his career as an officer in the Gendarmerie, served on the Italian Front during World War I and reached the rank of Major der Polizei by 1921. He joined the Austrian Nazi Party in September 1925 and became a right-wing parliamentary deputy and provincial minister in the Austrian province of Styria in 1930. Due to his involvement with the Nazis, Meyszner was forcibly retired in 1933 and arrested in February 1934, but released after three months at the Wöllersdorf concentration camp. That July, he was rearrested following an attempted coup, but escaped police custody and fled to Nazi Germany, where he joined the Ordnungspolizei (Orpo) and then the Allgemeine SS. After police postings in Austria, Germany and occupied Norway, Himmler appointed Meyszner as Higher SS and Police Leader in Serbia in early 1942. He was one of few Orpo officers to be appointed to such a role.

Meyszner's time in Belgrade was characterised by friction and competition with German military, economic and foreign affairs officials, and by his visceral hatred and distrust of Serbs. During his tenure, he oversaw regular reprisal killings and sent tens of thousands of forced labourers to the Reich and occupied Norway. His Gestapo detachment used a gas van to kill 8,000 Jewish women and children who had been detained at the Sajmište concentration camp. In April 1944, his outspoken complaints about a reduction in reprisals against civilians allowed his enemies within the German occupation regime in Serbia to have him removed. Himmler transferred him to Berlin with the task of establishing a Europe-wide Gendarmerie. After the war, he fell into the hands of the Allies and was interrogated by the United States Chief Counsel for the Prosecution of Axis Criminality. Extradited to Yugoslavia, he was tried for war crimes, along with many of his staff from his time in Serbia. He was found guilty by a Yugoslav military court and executed by hanging in January 1947.

== Early life and World War I service ==
August Edler von Meyszner was born in Graz, Austria-Hungary, on 3 August 1886, the son of Rudolf Edler von Meyszner, an Oberstleutnant (lieutenant colonel) in the Imperial-Royal Landwehr who had been knighted two years earlier, and his wife Therese (née Tuschner). His uncle was Feldmarschalleutnant (Major general) Ferdinand von Meyszner. He completed primary and secondary schooling in Graz, before attending a cadet school in Vienna. In 1908, he was posted to the 3rd Imperial-Royal Landwehr Infantry Regiment in Graz as an officer candidate and on 1 May 1908 was commissioned as a Leutnant (lieutenant) in the Leoben Battalion. Until 30 April 1913 he was a company officer with the signals and telephone detachment, and was also responsible for the ski training of the battalion. On 1 May 1913, he was transferred to the provincial Gendarmerie at his own request, initially stationed at Triest. In 1914 he underwent an examination for his new duties as a gendarmerie officer, and on 1 May 1914 he was formally accepted into the Austrian Gendarmerie Service.

He was initially appointed to command the 5th Gendarmerie Detachment in Görz (now the Italian town of Gorizia). On 23 June 1914 he was promoted to Gendarmerie-Oberleutnant (first lieutenant). In August he was appointed to command the coastal gendarmerie section at Grado and the following month he was transferred to the border guard section based at Tolmein, in modern-day Slovenia. A few days after the outbreak of World War I, Meyszner married Pia Gostischa from Marburg an der Drau (Maribor); the couple eventually had one daughter and one son. On 19 May 1915, Meyszner was posted as the commander of a gendarmerie company on the Italian Front. Later that year he was appointed as the commander of the 12th Alpine Company. On 1 August 1916, he was promoted to Rittmeister (captain) with effect from 11 August. During 1916–1917, Meyszner was a gendarmerie section commander, and in 1917 he served as an alpine advisor to the 15th Mountain Brigade. In August 1917 he was recalled to gendarmerie duties in Triest. In November 1918 he was transferred to the Styrian gendarmerie command in Graz. He was wounded once, and was also awarded several decorations for his service during the war, including the Order of the Iron Crown 3rd Class, Military Merit Cross 3rd Class, Military Merit Medal with Swords and War Decoration, Karl Troop Cross and Red Cross Decoration 2nd Class. With the collapse of the Habsburg Empire at the end of the war, Meyszner also lost his aristocratic title, a significant loss of social status.

== Interwar period ==
=== Police and political career in Austria ===
In December 1919, Meyszner was placed in charge of the border gendarmerie at the Styrian town of Judenburg, on the frontier with the newly created Kingdom of Serbs, Croats and Slovenes (later Yugoslavia), and was involved in fighting there. That year, he had become involved with the German-nationalist sporting association Deutsch-Völkischen Turnvereins and was made a leader in the right-wing paramilitary Steirischen Heimatschutz (Styrian Home Guard). He later used his senior position in the gendarmerie to funnel arms to the Home Guard.

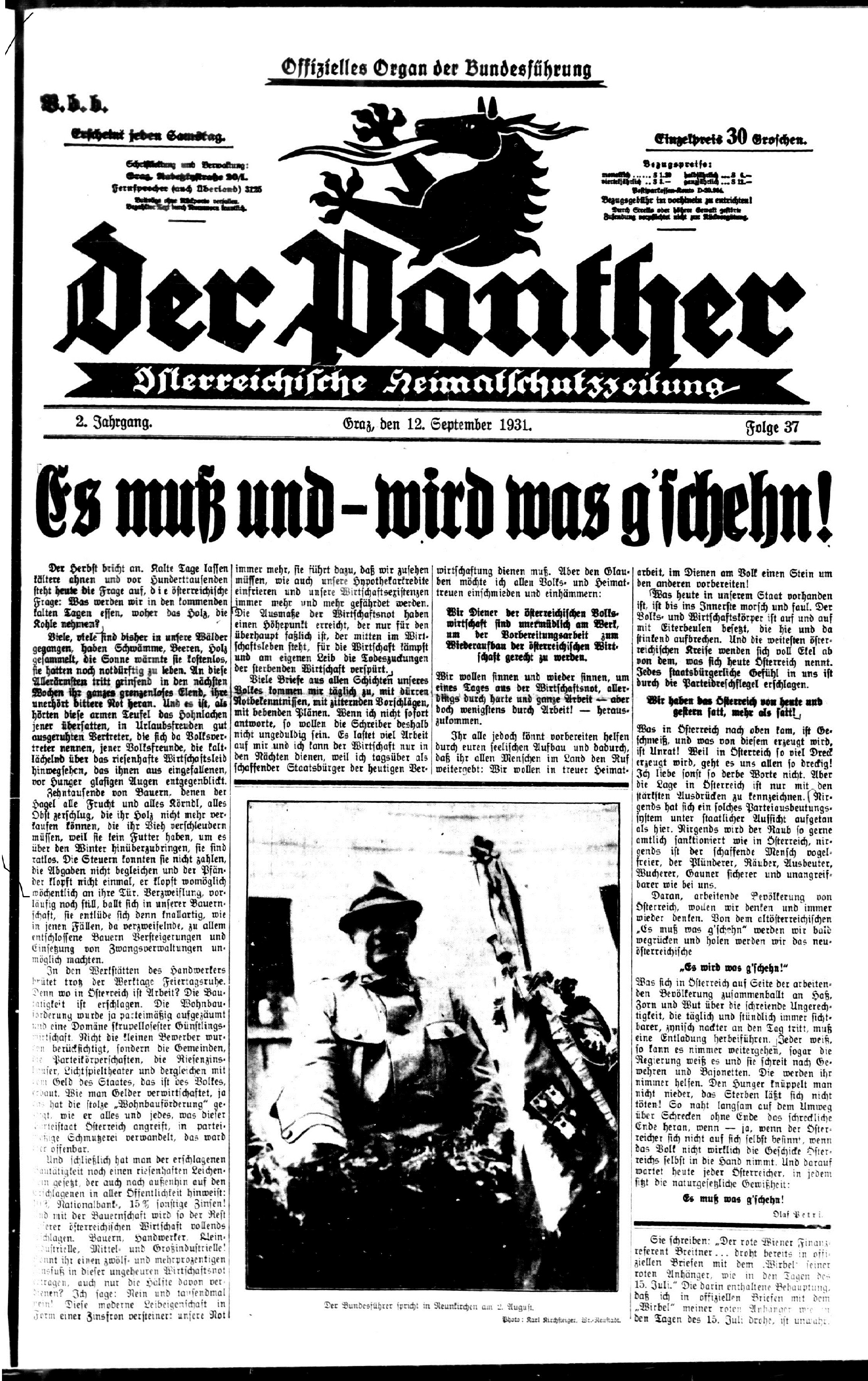
The front page of the Austrian-Styrian Heimwehr newspaper Der Panther on 13 September 1931, the day of Pfrimer's abortive putsch. The headline reads "Something must and will happen!"

Meyszner remained stationed at Judenburg for the next nine years, although he was sent on several detachments. In 1921, he was promoted to Major der Polizei (Major of Police). While commanding a gendarmerie detachment sent to oversee the unification of Burgenland with Austria in August 1921, Meyszner was shot in the leg by local Hungarians rebelling against the transfer. In 1922, his unit subdued significant labour unrest in the Judenburg region and in 1927 it quelled a strike in the aftermath of the July Revolt of 1927. Meyszner joined the Austrian Nazi Party on 5 September 1925, and was allocated membership number 10,617. In May 1927 he was granted an audience with Adolf Hitler, along with two of his Home Guard comrades, Walter Pfrimer and Hanns Albin Rauter. On 1 January 1929, Meyszner was transferred to Graz where he came into contact with more right-wing organisations.

In 1930, Meyszner became a right-wing deputy in the Styrian provincial parliament (German: Landtag) representing the Heimatblock, the political wing of the Heimatschutz, and because of the Styrian system of proportional representation he also became a minister of the provincial government. According to the German historian Martin Moll, Meyszner's governmental responsibilities meant that he was unable to take an active part in the abortive coup d'état led by the Home Guard Landesleiter Pfrimer in 1931 but while claiming he knew nothing of the putsch beforehand, he openly stated in the Landtag that he approved of it. According to Moll, the putsch leaders Pfrimer and Konstantin Kammerhofer went into hiding, and in the short term, Meyszner was the leader of the Home Guard. In contrast, the historian Ruth Birn writes that Meyszner was a major participant in the putsch and was arrested, brought to trial, and acquitted, along with Pfrimer and Kammerhofer. Following the trial, Kammerhofer replaced Pfrimer as the Landesleiter, and pursued an even more radical ideology of taking power by force and adoption of anti-Semitic principles. Initially, under Kammerhofer the Home Guard was strongly opposed to the Austrian Nazi Party, but this quickly changed, and he led a shift to a close association.

Meyszner continued his Home Guard activities and together with Rauter supported Kammerhofer's push for closer links with the Austrian Nazi Party, holding several meetings with Hitler's delegate in Austria, Theodor Habicht. In late 1933 the negotiations would culminate in the so-called Venice Agreement (German: Venediger Abkommen), by which Home Guard was transferred into the Nazi Party. The fact that Meyszner had completely adopted Nazi ideology was demonstrated by his anti-Jewish diatribe in the Landtag in April 1933, which reinforced his speeches advancing the anti-semitic policy of the Home Guard under Kammerhofer. From March 1933, the authoritarian Fatherland Front government of Engelbert Dollfuss prorogued parliamentary government and in June they banned the Austrian Nazi Party and the Home Guard. A few days before this, public servants who were members of the Austrian Nazi Party were classified as subversive. Based on these decrees, Meyszner was also denied his seat in parliament and forcibly retired from the gendarmerie in September 1933 at the age of 47.

As a result of his meetings with Habicht, Meyszner was appointed deputy leader of the Central Styria Sturmabteilung-Brigade, with the rank of SA-Obersturmbannführer. The Sturmabteilung (SA) was the paramilitary wing of the Nazi Party. He travelled widely, meeting Nazi leaders in Hungary and Yugoslavia. On 2 February 1934 Meyszner was arrested, and was interned in the Wöllersdorf concentration camp for three-and-a-half months for Nazi activities. Following a hunger strike and half-hearted prison revolt, he was released. Soon after, the leaders of the Styrian Home Guard were arrested and Meyszner took control of the organisation. Arrested shortly after the abortive July Putsch was launched, during which Dollfuss was assassinated, Meyszner escaped police custody on 27 July, and four days later fled to Yugoslavia. Kammerhofer also escaped from Austria in the wake of the attempted coup. Austrian authorities suspected that Meyszner had encouraged participation and provided supplies to the conspirators. His exact role in the July Putsch remains in question. The Styrian Home Guard and Styrian SA brigades played significant parts in the attempted putsch. According to the Austrian historian Hans Schafranek, Meyszner, along with Rauter and Kammerhofer, who led the Upper Styrian SA-Brigade, conspired with Habicht and the SS against the SA, effectively bypassing the leadership of the Austrian SA when they quickly supported the coup. Meyszner was very proud of the violence he had been involved in as part of his political activities in Austria.

In Yugoslavia, Meyszner was no longer able to access his pension and had few assets, and worked as the cultural policy chief of the centre for Nazi fugitives. He travelled to Germany by sea in November 1934. He first went to the camp for Nazi fugitives at Rummelsburg in Pomerania, before transferring to a similar facility in Berlin. Once in Germany, he submitted his résumé to the Allgemeine SS. At the time, the Allgemeine SS was a relatively new paramilitary arm of the German Nazi Party that was overtaking the SA in importance. In his résumé, he emphasised his experience as a political organiser and speaker and suggested that a purely military task would not make best use of his knowledge and skills.

=== Germany ===
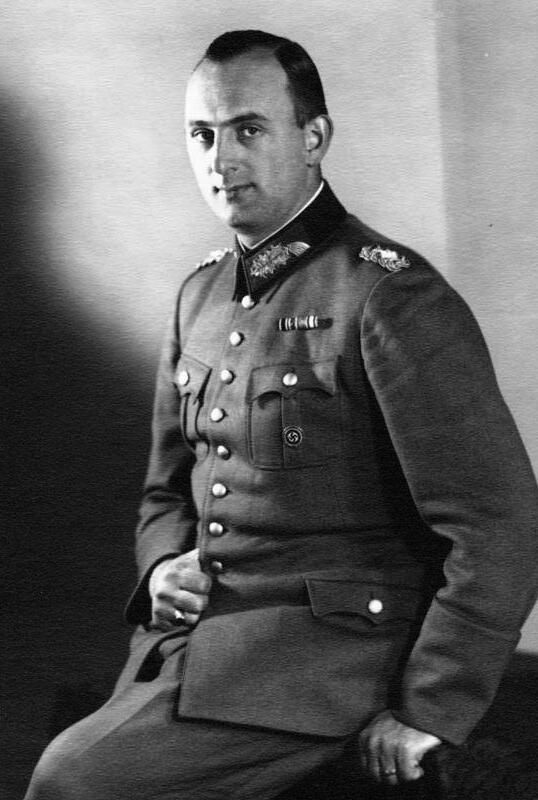
Orpo chief Kurt Daluege (pictured) had to intervene on Meyszner's behalf during an altercation with the State Secretary for Security in Austria, Ernst Kaltenbrunner.

Meyszner was briefly given a job coordinating support for Nazi fugitives from Austria on behalf of the SA. On 14 February 1935, he joined the Allgemeine SS and received the membership number 263,406 and the rank of SS-Oberführer. He then worked as SS Leader for Special Purposes of the Reichsführer-SS Heinrich Himmler, allocated to the Kommando Sammelstelle. He received German citizenship in May 1935. On 1 September 1935 he joined the Schutzpolizei (protection police), a branch of the uniformed Ordnungspolizei (order police, or Orpo), in the rank of Major der Schutzpolizei. He had been honourably discharged from the SA but his acceptance into the Allgemeine SS was short-lived, as police officers were not permitted to be members of the Allgemeine SS at that time. Meyszner was obliged to resign from the Allgemeine SS in October 1935. On 20 April 1937, he was promoted to the rank of Oberstleutnant der Polizei (lieutenant colonel of police). He was allowed to return to the Allgemeine SS in October 1937 and returned to his previous rank of SS-Oberführer, backdated to February 1935. He was appointed to the staff of SS-Abschnitt III (SS District III), and Schutzpolizei Group East Berlin. In 1937, Meyszner was appointed as an honorary judge of the People's Court, and in 1941 this appointment was extended. With units of the Ordnungspolizei Meyszner entered Austria during the Anschluss on 12 March 1938. Residing in Vienna he became acting Inspector of the Orpo in Austria and was promoted to the rank of Oberst der Polizei (colonel of police) on 18 March 1938. In the election and referendum of 10 April 1938 he was elected as a deputy to the Reichstag from the newly renamed Ostmark, a position he retained to the end of World War II. As from 12 April 1938 he was assigned as Inspector of the Orpo to the State Secretary for Security in Austria, Ernst Kaltenbrunner.

Soon after he had taken office Meyszner clashed with Kaltenbrunner, requiring the intervention of the Chief of the Orpo, SS-Obergruppenführer und General der Polizei Kurt Daluege. Meyszner was transferred to the Sudetenland in early October 1938, after its annexation by Germany, as an Orpo district commander. On 20 April 1939, he was promoted to Generalmajor der Ordnungspolizei. In June 1939, he was again transferred, this time to Kassel, as Inspector of Orpo for the Prussian province of Hesse-Nassau. He remained in this role until 10 September 1940, during which time he was promoted to SS-Brigadeführer on 20 April 1940. Despite the high rank he achieved in the Allgemeine SS, Meyszner never joined the German Nazi Party.

== World War II ==
=== 1940–42 ===
After war broke out, Meyszner was appointed to more senior positions, beginning in early 1940 when he was named a representative of the Higher SS and Police Leader (German: Höherer SS- und Polizeiführer, HSSPF) for Fulda-Werra, SS-Obergruppenführer Josias Waldeck-Pyrmont. On 10 September 1940, Himmler appointed Meyszner to command the Orpo in newly occupied Norway, working with HSSPF Nord, SS-Obergruppenführer Wilhelm Rediess. During 1941, Meyszner was awarded the War Merit Cross 2nd Class with Swords. In mid-January 1942, he was recalled to Germany and, despite his low rank, attended a conference of senior SS leaders at Hegewald, Himmler's field headquarters near Hitler's Wolf's Lair in East Prussia. The conference discussed the use of forced labour, the coming Final Solution and Generalplan Ost, a plan for the colonisation of Central and Eastern Europe by ethnic Germans. According to Moll, Meyszner's suitability for working in the German-occupied territory of Serbia was discussed at the conference. On 1 January 1942, Meyszner was promoted to SS-Gruppenführer, and on 20 January, he was promoted to Generalleutnant der Polizei, backdated to 1 January 1942.

=== Higher SS and Police Leader in Serbia ===
==== 1942 ====
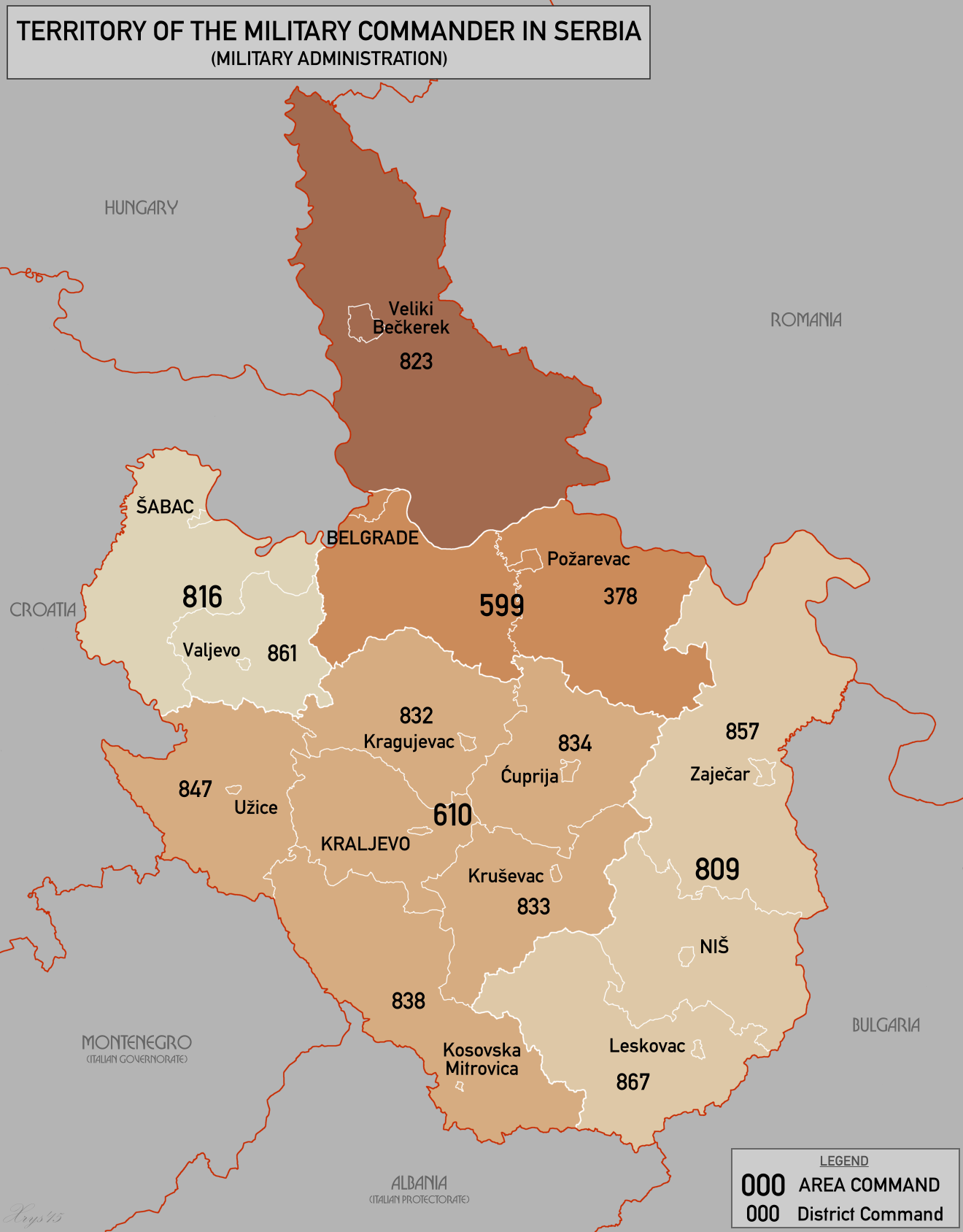
The German-occupied territory of Serbia, showing the German area commands and military districts

The German-occupied territory of Serbia, an area of Yugoslavia roughly corresponding to the borders of the pre-1912 Kingdom of Serbia, had been retained under military administration following the April 1941 German-led Axis invasion of Yugoslavia. The German military administration supervised a Serbian puppet regime known as the Government of National Salvation, led by the former Yugoslav Minister of War, Milan Nedić. The appointment of a HSSPF had not been planned and this initially accorded with the preferences of the Wehrmacht commander in the territory. A communist-led uprising had erupted in mid-1941 and while it had been brutally suppressed during Operation Uzice in December, it was expected to return in early 1942. To address this, Himmler decided to appoint a HSSPF for the occupied territory, as he considered the existing occupation regime was not being sufficiently harsh with the Serbs. Meyszner was chosen for the new position, despite the fact that few HSSPF were selected from the Orpo. At 55 years old, Meyszner was also the oldest HSSPF appointed.

Meyszner arrived in Belgrade in late January 1942, inserted into a political maelstrom of conflicting lines of command and authority. Even the military lines of command were confusing. One branch of the military staff was responsible for the administration of the occupied territory and another was responsible for military operations against the insurgents. A few weeks after Meyszner's arrival, the two military positions were combined into the Commanding General and Military Commander in Serbia, in the person of General der Artillerie (Lieutenant general) Paul Bader, who had previously been the Plenipotentiary Commanding General in Serbia. Bader reported to the Wehrmacht Commander in South-East Europe, General der Pioniere (Lieutenant general) Walter Kuntze, who reported directly to Hitler. The military chain of command considered Meyszner's appointment "a very peremptory organisational change". Kuntze's chief of staff described Meyszner as one "for whom we did not ask".

Bader's staff was split into a military command staff led by Oberst (Colonel) Erich Kewisch and an administrative staff under the control of SS-Gruppenführer Harald Turner. Kewisch's staff had direct control of the regional defence battalions and worked with the military forces of occupation in the territory. Turner's staff supervised the Serbian puppet regime, the German commandants of the four military districts and the police and security forces.

Overlapping the military chain of command, there was a plenipotentiary of the Foreign Office, Felix Benzler, reporting to the Foreign Minister, Joachim von Ribbentrop, and for economic affairs, a representative of Reichsmarschall Hermann Göring, Franz Neuhausen. These power structures competed, to a greater extent than anywhere else in occupied Europe. Meyszner's appointment further complicated an already complex situation, as prior to this decision, Turner had been responsible for police and security matters. Meyszner had to formally acknowledge Bader as his superior but received his orders from Hitler and Himmler. One of his priorities was to improve coordination of policies towards the Volksdeutsche (or Germans of Yugoslavia), concentrated in the Banat region, as the decision had been made in late 1941 to subject them to conscription in order to raise a Waffen-SS division. This decision, approved by Hitler a few days before Meyszner's appointment, had strengthened Himmler's case for a HSSPF in Belgrade.

Meyszner took control of the police organs that had formerly been under the control of Turner, grouped as Einsatzgruppe Serbia, consisting of Sicherheitsdienst (Security Service, or SD) and Sicherheitspolizei (Security Police, or SiPo), as well as the 64th Reserve Police Battalion. These had been commanded by SS-Standartenführer (SS-Colonel) Wilhelm Fuchs, who had overseen the shooting of many Serbian and Jewish males and others, mainly by Wehrmacht units, between August 1941 and the end of that year. Meyszner's deputy was SS-Standartenführer Emanuel Schäfer and the head of the Belgrade Gestapo was SS-Sturmbannführer (SS-Major) Bruno Sattler. The head of the Gestapo Jewish Section was SS-Untersturmführer (SS-Lieutenant) Fritz Stracke.

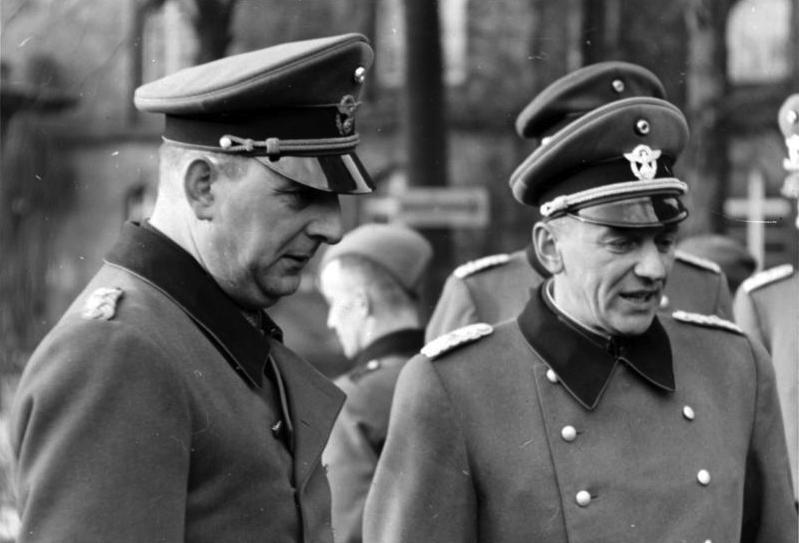
Wilhelm Fuchs (right) with Daluege. Fuchs was responsible for police and security matters in Serbia prior to Meyszner's arrival.

As soon as he took office, Meyszner embarked on a thorough re-organisation of all police operations in the occupied territory. He created four police area commands, aligned to the four military area commands, and ten police districts, corresponding to the military district commands. He took under his command the forces of the Serbian puppet government, known as the Serbian State Guard, and also established a number of auxiliary and volunteer police units across the whole territory. One of the units controlled by Meyszner was the Auxiliary Police Troop, recruited from Russian Volksdeutsche from the occupied territory but also from Croatia, Bulgaria, Greece and Romania and trained by the Orpo. It was planned to reach a strength of 400 men but little is known about its activities.

As HSSPF, Meyszner was not restricted to police matters. His subordination to Bader was "personal and direct" but this did not mean the police and security apparatus he commanded was subject to day-to-day direction from Bader's headquarters staff. Military jurisdiction over Meyszner and his organisation was restricted to matters involving the military security of the territory and military operations. Meyszner's duties also extended to any matter related to the "strengthening" of the German minority in Serbia, which included authority over the security forces of the puppet regime and collection of revenue and the consolidation and utilisation of existing Volksdeutsche volunteer units in the Waffen-SS. Almost as soon as he arrived in Belgrade, Meyszner met with SS-Obergruppenführer Werner Lorenz, the Chief of the Hauptamt Volksdeutsche Mittelstelle (Main Welfare Office for Ethnic Germans, or VoMi), founded to manage the interests of the Volksdeutsche outside the borders of the Reich. The VoMi was also responsible for orchestrating the Nazi ideology of Lebensraum (living space) in Eastern Europe. Meyszner also met with SS-Obersturmführer (SS-Lieutenant colonel) Sepp Janko, the leader of the Volksdeutsche in the Banat and with SS-Brigadeführer und Generalmajor der Waffen SS Artur Phleps, to discuss the formation of the new division, the 7th SS Volunteer Mountain Division Prinz Eugen. Plans for more general conscription of the Volksdeutsche did not meet with approval from Berlin.

As soon as he took up his role, Meyszner immediately ran into difficulties with Turner, who was responsible for internal affairs and co-operation with the puppet regime. Turner was a proponent of strengthening the puppet regime and making use of all Serbs that were willing to collaborate with the occupiers. Meyszner had a diametrically opposed personal view and throughout his time in Belgrade refused to support or work with the Serb authorities, except at a purely tactical level. He considered Serbian collaborators as a "potential danger". His dislike of Serbs was so great that he is said to have remarked, "I like a dead Serb better than a live one". Meyszner was also reported to have referred to Serbs as "a people of rats" (German: ein Rattenvolk). The historian Jonathan Steinberg describes Meyszner as one of Himmler's most brutal subordinates.

In April, Turner wrote in a self-congratulatory tone to Himmler's personal staff officer, SS-Obergruppenführer Karl Wolff, stating that he had already had all the available Jewish men killed and all the women and children placed in the Sajmište concentration camp. He went on to claim that he had arranged, with the help of the SD, a gas van to clear the camp in a period of a fortnight to four weeks. Holocaust historian Christopher Browning considers this claim suspect, stating that Turner's reports about Jewish affairs were often inaccurate and self-serving in an attempt to ingratiate himself with Hitler and shore up his position. Browning's view is that a van was dispatched after regular requests from Belgrade for the remaining Jews to be deported directly, so that the local authorities could resolve the matter themselves. When the van arrived in Belgrade, Meyszner was kept informed, and Schäfer asked him for directions.

Schäfer delegated the task of killing the Jewish women and children to Sattler. In turn, Sattler tasked the camp commandant, SS-Untersturmfuhrer Herbert Andorfer, to accompany the van, which would be operated by two SS-Scharführers (non-commissioned officers) sent with the van from Berlin. Except for Sundays and public holidays, the van collected groups of about 100 women and children from the camp on a daily basis and drove them to a shooting range outside Belgrade. During the trip, the exhaust would be redirected into the cargo area, killing the occupants. On arrival at the range, a four-man detachment from the German 64th Reserve Police Battalion would be waiting with a group of seven Serbian prisoners from the Belgrade prison. The prisoners would unload the van and put the corpses in a pre-dug mass grave. By 10 May 1942, the camp was empty and as many as 8,000 Jewish women and children had been killed by Meyszner's Gestapo. On 8 June, Schäfer declared to a group of Wehrmacht officers, including Bader and Kuntze, that there was "no longer a Jewish question in Serbia".

Turner and Meyszner clashed continually throughout 1942, as Meyszner sought to remove all police matters from Turner's remit, including the supervision of the security forces of the Serbian collaborationist regime. In response, Turner fought hard to maintain control over these areas. Meyszner believed the only way to maintain peace and security was the use of brutal police methods; Turner wanted to empower the Nedić regime and then replace the military administration with a civil one, akin to the Reichskommissariat Niederlande, with himself as Reichskommissar (governor). Meysner considered Turner a "friend of Serbs" because of his support of Nedić, despite Turner's rigorous approach when dealing with the Serbs in the occupied territory. Meyszner attempted to have Turner's staff downgraded and incorporated into Bader's staff but Wolff intervened to prevent this. Turner's approach was also seriously out-of-step with the Wehrmacht, which considered the territory a combat zone and wanted to eliminate inefficiencies and overlapping jurisdictions.

Despite their initial misgivings, the Wehrmacht established a good working relationship with Meyszner during 1942. Bader and Meyszner met regularly and supported each other where their interests coincided. By contrast, the conflict between Meyszner and Turner soon became intractable – they sent long letters of complaint to each other which they copied to Himmler. Himmler stuck to his general approach, which was that SS officers should resolve their differences face-to-face. Meyszner fundamentally opposed any attempts by Turner to expand the remit of the Serbian puppet regime, including the creation of sporting organisations and the re-opening of the University of Belgrade, asserting that it could not be in Germany's interests to "breed hostile Slavic intelligence". He was also opposed to any organization that might include "Serbian" in the name.

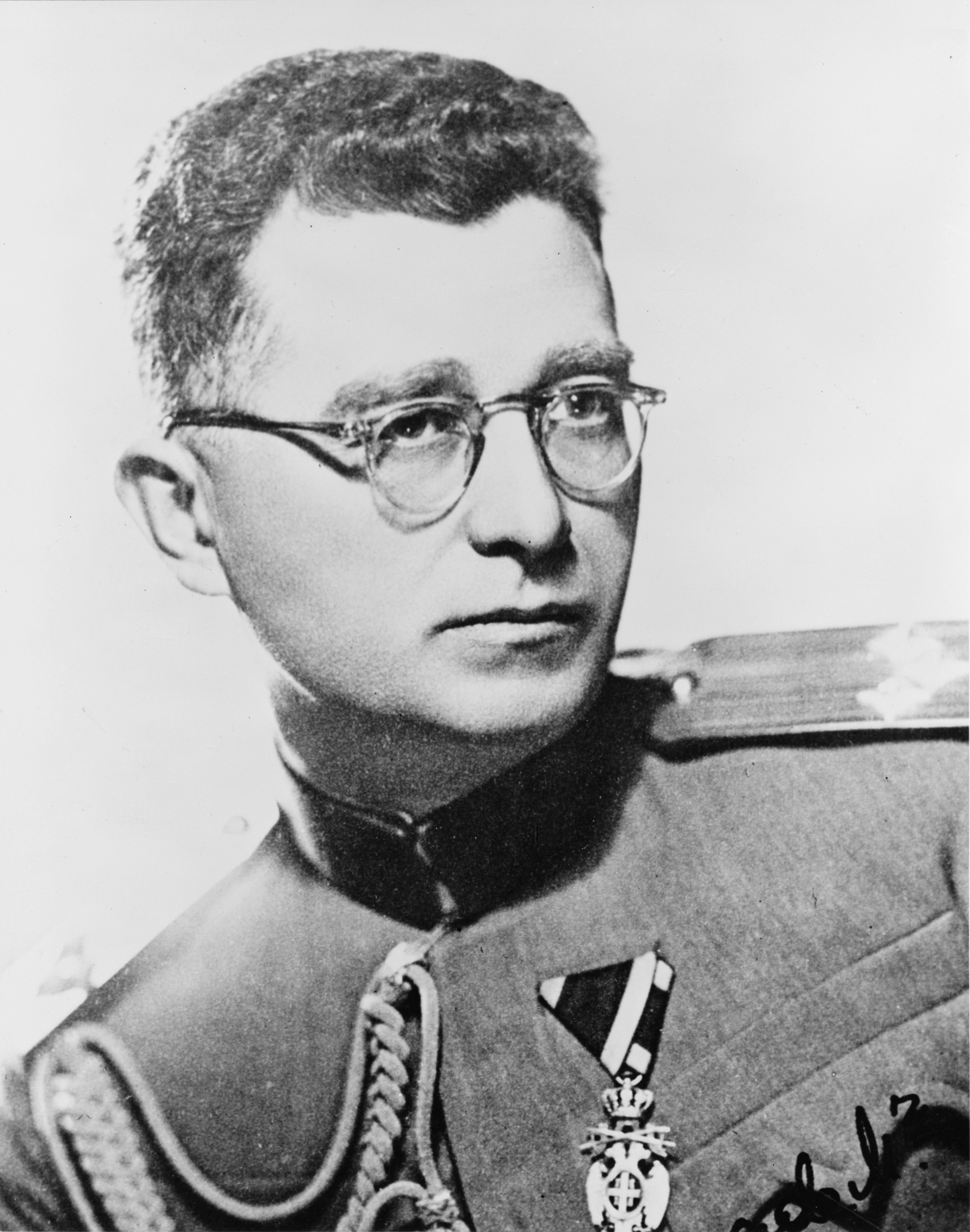
Meyszner distrusted Nedić's security forces as he believed they were loyal to Chetnik leader Draža Mihailović (pictured).

Meyszner's reports to Himmler fuelled distrust of the Serbian security forces, stating that it was "insane" to arm the 16,000-strong Serbian State Guard, as he believed that their loyalties lay with the royalist Chetnik leader Draža Mihailović, not with the Germans or the Nedić regime. The depths to which Turner and Meyszner's personal vendetta plunged is demonstrated by the fact that they could not even agree on how to use the funds stolen from Serbian Jews killed as part of the Final Solution in 1941 and the first half of 1942. On 1 August 1942, Kuntze was replaced as Wehrmacht Commander in South-East Europe by Luftwaffe Generaloberst Alexander Löhr, another Austrian. In early September 1942, Meyszner filed an official report with Himmler alleging that Turner had breached section 90 of the German Penal Code by betraying state secrets. Concerned by this attack, in mid-September Turner issued an order to his staff directing them to defer to the authority of the HSSPF and his staff in all police matters and also many other administrative and highly political matters, such as the approval of events, gambling, right of assembly and monitoring of commerce. The dispute was so out-of-hand that only outside intervention would be effective. In October, the Main SS Personnel Office sent an emissary to Belgrade to investigate and report on the situation. This report described the behaviour of both Turner and Meyszner as "shameful" but the die was cast.

On 17 October, Himmler met with Meyszner at Kraljevo while inspecting the newly created 7th SS Division. While mildly rebuking Meyszner over the vendetta and warning him that if such behaviour recurred, Himmler would have to dismiss him, Himmler was impressed with the new division. According to Moll, an important factor in Himmler's final decision was undoubtedly the fact that the dismissal of Turner, part of the Wehrmacht command structure, would be much less embarrassing for him than the dismissal of his personal representative, Meyszner. Despite the fact that Turner was "strict and unyielding", he was far more considerate of the concerns of Nedić, his regime and the Serbian population than any other senior member of the government of occupation. It was not just Meyszner's machinations that eventually unseated Turner, because he had been joined in his call for Turner's replacement by Kuntze. On 7 or 8 November 1942, Turner and his deputy Georg Kiessel were forced out and Turner was succeeded by his legal department chief, Walter Uppenkamp. In November, Meysner ordered the execution of 13 suspected members of Mihailović's Chetniks, and the following month the occupation forces executed at least 170 people in Belgrade – members of both the Partisan and Chetnik movements. Löhr was redesignated as Commander-in-Chief South-East Europe and Commander Army Group E in December, but the local command situation did not change. During 1942, Meyszner was awarded the War Merit Cross 1st Class with Swords.

==== 1943 ====
In January 1943, Nedić proposed a basic law for Serbia, in effect a constitution creating an authoritarian corporative state similar to that long advocated by Dimitrije Ljotić and his pre-war fascist Yugoslav National Movement. Bader asked the various agency heads for their views, and despite some specialists recommending its adoption, Meyszner strongly opposed it, seeing it as a threat to German interests. Passed to Löhr then to Hitler, a response was received in March. Hitler considered it "untimely". Meyszner wrote that even through the occupied territory had borders and was a clearly defined administrative unit, its ongoing existence was uncertain so it could not be referred to as a state. He also thought that the Serb population of the occupied territory were not ready to join in the "building of new Europe".

In March 1943, Meyszner complained to Himmler that Benzler had adopted a "soft" policy towards the Serbs, allowing them to take charge of the supervision of crops. He considered those that granted additional powers and freedoms to the Serbian puppet regime were irresponsible, because they did not understand the real motives of the various Serb groups. One of many matters of concern to Meyszner was the formation of the Serbian Volunteer Corps, which was an extension of Ljotić's movement. Meyszner thought that Turner and Benzler had erred in allowing its formation and observed that it was spreading royalist propaganda. According to Moll, Meyszner's perspective was very narrow and did not take into account foreign policy objectives associated with giving some power to the Nedić regime. By the end of 1942, Meyszner had extracted all the usable military manpower from the Volksdeutsche of the Banat and the economy and administration of that territory was suffering. As a consequence, he requested the release of all men aged 40 and over from service in the 7th SS Division. As an alternative, he turned his attention to the minority groups that also lived in the Banat, including Hungarians, Romanians and Slovaks. His recommendation that these people be subjected to conscription was not accepted by Himmler.

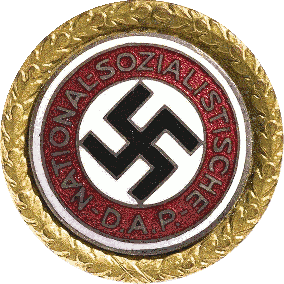
Meyszner was awarded the coveted Golden Party Badge in 1943.

From the time he had fled to Germany, Meyszner had been engaged in a dispute regarding his membership in the Nazi Party. He had maintained that the Venice Agreement meant that he and other members of the Styrian Home Guard had been accepted into the Nazi Party with prestigious low membership numbers corresponding to the dates of their entry into the Home Guard. The treasurer of the Nazi Party, Franz Xaver Schwarz, did not accept the Agreement and determined that the members of the Styrian Home Guard were not automatically transferred to the Nazi Party. This became an issue when Hitler decided to mark the 10th anniversary of his seizure of power and tasked his private secretary and head of the Nazi Party Chancellery, Reichsleiter Martin Bormann, to determine who should be issued one of a strictly limited number of Golden Party Badges to mark the anniversary. Meyszner, who had been recommended by Himmler, accepted that his party membership was retrospectively determined to be 1 June 1938 and he was allocated a party number of 6,119,650. Thus he effectively joined the Nazi Party as late as 1943. Due to these decisions, Meyszner did not qualify as an Alter Kämpfer (Old Fighter) and Himmler had to intervene on behalf of Meyszner to ensure he received the badge. Meyszner was one of only five SS men that Himmler deemed worthy of this particular award.

Using his responsibility for the Volksdeutsche of the Banat as a pretext, Meyszner constantly interfered with operational orders issued to the 7th SS Division. In September 1943, the total police forces at his disposal comprised the 5th SS-Polizei Regiment, (Note: According to Browning, the 64th Reserve Police Battalion later became the 1st Battalion of the 5th SS-Polizei Regiment.) minus one company detached to occupied Greece and seven battalions of Hilfspolizei (auxiliary police) of various ethnicities, which had only received 4–5 weeks training due to constant employment.

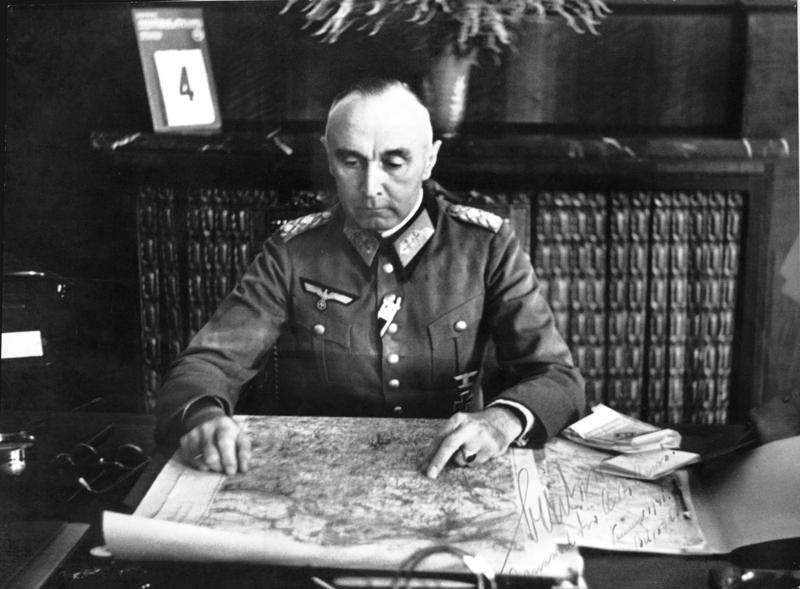
General der Artillerie Paul Bader worked well with Meyszner until early 1943, when Bader realised that Meyszner had been undermining him in reports to Himmler.

The good relationship between Bader and Meyszner continued until early 1943, when Bader became aware Meyszner had been undermining him in his reports to Himmler, blaming the Wehrmacht for the failure to combat the Partisan threat. In April 1943, Bader wrote to Löhr complaining bitterly about Meyszner allocating 300 Soviet prisoners of war to the Russian Factory Protection Group without consulting him and the fact that he had not been advised of desertions from the Serbian Volunteer Corps. Bader described his situation as "impossible", observing that Meyszner was disputing his orders through the police chain of command but that he, Bader, was held responsible for all matters concerning the occupied territory. Thereafter, Bader was no longer Meyszner's ally and this did not bode well for any future clashes with other powerful individuals in the occupation regime. Nedić continued to rail against German occupation policy and the fact that he had to report to four different authorities, who issued sometimes contradictory orders. In May, Meyszner attended a meeting at the Foreign Office, at which he disparaged Nedić and his loyalty to Germany, stating that he could be considered reliable only in fighting the communists. In July and August, some simplification occurred, when Neuhausen was appointed as chief of the military administration staff, but Meyszner remained largely independent. At Meyszner's insistence, on 5 August the Bader gave an order which stated that male family members of resistance fighters could either be fined, be shipped to Germany as forced labour or be executed in reprisals. Meyszner's police and security apparatus continued to carry out such reprisals when requested by the Wehrmacht. At the end of June, Meyszner ordered the execution of 575 prisoners in response to an attack in which eight German auxiliary police officers were killed and seven were wounded.

In September 1943, a new plenipotentiary of the Foreign Ministry was appointed for the Balkans. This made Benzler's position redundant and he was recalled to Berlin. Special Envoy Hermann Neubacher arrived in Belgrade armed with orders from Hitler, directing him to undertake a range of tasks aimed at unifying the fight against communist forces in south-east Europe. These orders specifically directed Neubacher to make best use of the local anti-communist forces and to negotiate with them to achieve that goal. He was also empowered to streamline the German occupation administration and transfer more power to local proxies, like the Nedić regime. The orders also placed Neubacher in charge of all decisions regarding the carrying out of reprisals against the local population. But like Meyszner, Neubacher found that the local conditions meant his ability to carry out his mandate was limited. Neuhausen, having recently been appointed as the chief of the military administration, had far more real power than Neubacher and was doing too good a job of exploiting the Serbian economy to hand any of it over to the Serbian puppet regime. Meyszner himself was strictly opposed to the transfer of any power to the Nedić administration and also resisted attempts to conclude agreements with the Chetniks to fight the Partisans, seeing the former as an attempt to return to Turner's failed policies. According to the historian Jozo Tomasevich, the main success Neubacher was able to achieve was a significant reduction in reprisals, although Moll disputes this conclusion. Neubacher was contemptuous of Meyszner and what Neubacher called his "totally primitive extermination thesis".

In November, Meyszner's area of responsibility was expanded to include the German-occupied territory of Montenegro. The following month, SS-Standartenführer Paul Blobel's Kommando 1005 arrived in Belgrade to dig up and burn the bodies of the Jewish women and children killed by Meyszner's Gestapo. At the end of 1943, Meyszner was awarded the Iron Cross 2nd Class.

==== 1944 ====
In February 1944, Meyszner's campaign against the German-Chetnik agreements escalated sharply. He had unusual allies in this, as Nedić and Ljotić also opposed them, in their case because the agreements tended to sideline them in favour of the Chetniks. In particular, Meyszner strongly opposed the further arming of the Chetniks led by Đurišić and Lukačević, on the grounds that they had not upheld their previous agreements and that the Croats, as well as Muslims in Albania, Kosovo and the Sandžak, had expressed concerns about any strengthening of the Chetniks. The commander of the Bulgarian 1st Occupation Corps, General Asen Nikolov, also opposed the agreements. Meyszner's increasing objections to the agreements coincided with growing Partisan pressure from the west and the advance of the Red Army from the east.

In April, Neubacher and the Wehrmacht managed to get rid of Meyszner. The catalyst for his recall was Meyszner's public criticism of Neubacher over reprisals, which Neubacher characterised as "undermining official discipline". Neubacher was assisted in this by Meyszner's old nemesis, Kaltenbrunner, who was now the chief of the RSHA. Even Schäfer was no longer able to work with Meyszner and supported Neubacher's campaign against his superior. Meyszner was replaced by SS-Gruppenführer und Generalleutnant der Polizei Hermann Behrends, a protégé of the assassinated head of the SD, SS-Obergruppenführer und General der Polizei Reinhard Heydrich. Immediately before his appointment, Behrends had been serving as an SS-Sturmbannführer der Reserve commanding a mountain artillery battalion in the 13th Waffen Mountain Division of the SS Handschar (1st Croatian). In mid-May 1944, Meyszner was awarded the Iron Cross 1st Class for his efforts fighting the Partisans in Serbia.

== Fate ==
While Himmler agreed to relieve Meyszner as HSSPF for Serbia and Montenegro, he did this by transferring him to Berlin and appointing him as Generalinspekteur der Gendarmerie und Schutzpolizei der Gemeinden (General Inspector of the Gendarmerie and Schutzpolizei in the Reich) with the intention of establishing a Europe-wide gendarmerie. Nothing is known about Meyszner's activities in this role. At the end of the war, he fell into the hands of the Western Allies and his high SS rank ensured attention from investigators. He was interrogated by the United States Chief Counsel for the Prosecution of Axis Criminality, Robert H. Jackson, in June 1945 and was placed into Yugoslav custody soon after. His involvement in the carrying out of reprisal executions both on his own account and on behalf of the Wehrmacht, and the publication of his name along with lists of those executed, meant that his fate was certain.

As far as the killing of Jewish women and children is concerned, Meyszner's direct involvement is less clear. According to Moll, Schäfer claimed that he had received the orders and gas van directly from Berlin and had carried out the killings with little reference to Meyszner. Manoschek accepts Schäfer's assertion, stating that Schäfer also had an independent Gestapo chain of command, over which Meyszner had very limited control. Despite this, as HSSPF he was formally responsible for all his subordinates, including the Gestapo department that killed the Jewish women and children. He was also responsible for carrying out policies that saw 70,000 Serbs transported to the Reich as forced labourers, 4,000 of whom ended up in occupied Norway. The Holocaust in Serbia played little part in his trial before the Supreme Military Court in Belgrade between 9 and 22 December 1946. On 22 December, he was sentenced to death, along with most of the 20 leading members of his HSSPF staff who were tried at the same time. On 24 January 1947, Meyszner was executed by hanging.
