= Lazo M. Kostić =

Montenegrin-Serbian writer and economist

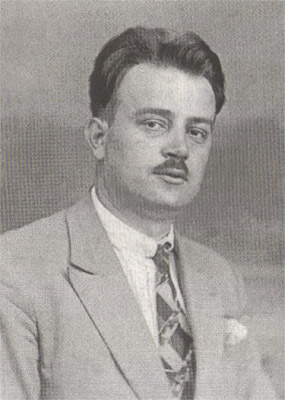

Commissioner for Transportation Commissioner Government
- In office 30 April 1941 – 10 July 1941
- Prime Minister: Milan Aćimović
- Preceded by: Post established
- Succeeded by: Ranisav Avramović

Personal details
- Born: Lazar Kostić; 15 March 1897 Kotor, Kingdom of Dalmatia, Austria-Hungary (modern-day Montenegro)
- Died: 17 January 1979 (aged 81) Zurich, Switzerland
- Resting place: Saint Luka Church, Gošići, Montenegro
- Party: People's Radical Party
- Profession: Jurist, university professor

Lazar "Lazo" M. Kostić (Serbian Cyrillic: Лазар Лазо М. Костић; 15 March 1897 – 17 January 1979) was a Montenegrin Serb nationalist writer, economist, statistician and doctor of law.

== Biography ==
Kostić was born on 15 March 1897 in Vranovići near Kotor, at the time part of the Kingdom of Dalmatia, Austria-Hungary (now Montenegro) to Marko Kostić and Darinka Petković. His father was an Orthodox priest, coming from a family with long monastic tradition. His mother was a daughter of a notable captain Savo Petković, personal skipper of Prince Nikola's yacht Sybil, whom he took over after Prince Nikola bought it from Jules Verne. Lazo was professor at University of Belgrade School of Law at Subotica and Law university in Ljubljana and dean of University of Belgrade.

After the Axis invasion of Yugoslavia in April 1941, Kostić joined the German-appointed Commissioner Government, which was led by Milan Aćimović. The Commissioner Administration was "a simple instrument of the [German] occupation regime", that "lacked any semblance of power". Kostić was the commissioner for transportation from 30 April until 10 July 1941 when he resigned. After that, he refused to take part in the successor puppet government, the Government of National Salvation led by Milan Nedić.

Kostić left Belgrade before its fall to the Yugoslav Partisans and the Soviet Red Army in October 1944. He was charged with collaboration In absentia on 6 March 1945. Following the war, he was a defender of the Chetnik movement of Draža Mihailović, and wrote several books, advancing several controversial claims, including that Bosnian Muslims are Serbs, and that war-time Serbia was free of antisemitism.

Since the fall of communism, Kostić's works have become readily available in Serbia and many of them have been reprinted. The nationalist Serbian Radical Party has reprinted several of Kostić's works, with party leader Vojislav Šešelj personally editing the publications.

== Works ==
- Megalomanija jednog malog i neskrupuloznog naroda (Self- exaltation of a Small and Unscrupulous People), Srpska knjiga, 1955
- Sporni predeli Srba i Hrvata, American Institute for Balkan Affairs, 1957
- Obmane i izvrtanja kao podloga narodnosti : Srpsko-hrvatski odnosi poslednjih godina, Srpska narodna odbrana, 1959
- Ćirilica i srpstvo: Kulturno-politička studija, American Institute for Balkan Affairs, 1960
- O srpskom karakteru Boke Kotorske, 1961
- Srpska Vojvodina i njene manjine : demografsko-etnografska studija, Srpski kulturni klub "sv. Sava", 1962
- Nove jugoslovenske "narodnosti" : demografsko-etnografska studija, Srpski kulturni klub "sv. Sava", 1965
- Šta su Srbi mislili o Bosni : političko-istorijska studija, 1965
- Etnički odnosi Bosne i Hercegovine, Iskra, 1967
- Hrvatska zverstva u drugom svetskom ratu: prema izjavama njihovih saveznika [Croatian Crimes During WWII: In Light of Documents by Their Allies] (PDF) (in Serbian) (2nd ed.). Chicago: Srpska narodna odbrana. 1974. OCLC 3861350. 3rd ed. 1990 (Belgrade).
  - Dodatak knjizi Hrvatska zverstva u drugom svetskom ratu: prema izjavama njihovih saveznika [Appendix to the Book Croatian Crimes During WWII: In Light of Documents by Their Allies] (PDF) (in Serbian). Melbourne. 1975. Archived from the original (PDF) on 26 April 2017.
- Nasilno prisvajanje dubrovačke kulture : kulturno-istorijska i etnopolitička studija
- The holocaust in the independent state of Croatia: an account based on German, Italian and the other sources, Liberty, 1981
- Srbi i Jevreji, R.M. Nikašinović and I.M. Pavlović, 1988

== See also ==
- Djoko Slijepčević
- Dimitrije Najdanović
