= Heinrich Danckelmann =

Luftwaffe General (1887–1947)

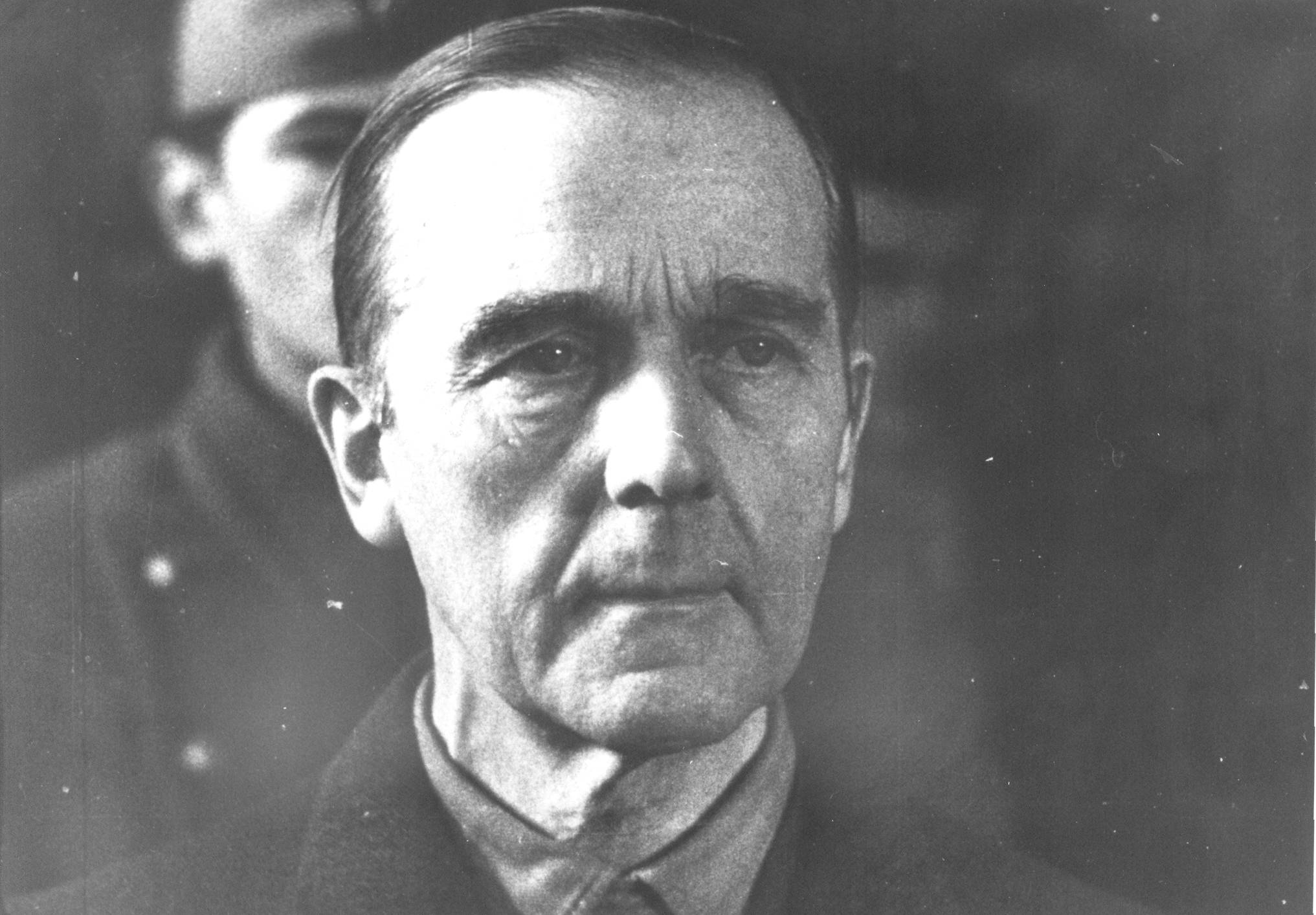
- Dankelmann at his trial (1947)
- Born: 2 August 1887; Hardehausen Abbey, German Empire
- Died: 30 October 1947 (aged 60) Belgrade, PR Serbia, FPR Yugoslavia
- Cause of death: Execution by hanging
- Allegiance: German Empire (1905–1918); Weimar Republic (1918–1933); Nazi Germany (1933–1945)
- Rank: General der Flieger

Heinrich Dankelmann (2 August 1887 – 30 October 1947) was a Luftwaffe General who served as the third Military Commander for the Territory of the Military Commander in Serbia from 23 July to 20 October 1941. During his tenure as commander he oversaw numerous war crimes against the population, most famously hanging of five prisoners at Terazije Square. He was sentenced to death and executed for war crimes in Yugoslavia in 1947.

== World War II ==
To deal with the Uprising in Serbia and the failure of the Commissioner Government, Milan Aćimović, the leader of the CG, suggested that Danckelmann negotiate with Milan Nedić to form a new puppet government. After short negotiations on August 29, 1941, Nedić's government was formed. This was done with the blessing of Heinrich Himmler and Reinhard Heydrich but at great risk for Danckelmann as Adolf Hitler, Joachim von Ribbentrop, and the German High Command were not informed.

During September, Danckelmann met with the Italian delegation in Belgrade and Nedić, at which time it became clear to him that Nedić couldn't handle the uprising. Danckelmann wanted Italian troops to help crush uprising, however Nedić insisted that only German troops could hold 'peace in Serbia'. Italians were hesitant to help, because of problems in their own occupied territories.

During Danckelmann's rule, the Serbian population was terrorized in an effort to put down the uprising, while Nedić's government existed as helper to the occupier. Five 'patriots' were hanged as an example on August 17. Twenty-one people were executed and 50 were arrested for the killing of a German postman between September 1 and 3 in Belgrade. 290 hostages were executed on September 16–17. Similar crimes happened in Serbian interior too, such as killing 20 near Bogatić. Danckelmann also enlarged the jurisdiction of Banjica concentration camp to the entire area of occupied Serbia, whereas it had previously been seen as limited to Belgrade. Franz Böhme took over from Danckelmann as commander of occupied Serbia on September 19.

Danckelmann was sentenced to death and executed for war crimes in Yugoslavia in 1947.

== Sources ==
- Glišić, Venceslav (1970). TEROR I ZLOČINI NACISTIČKE NEMAČKE U SRBIJI 1941-1945. Belgrade: Rad.
