= Dušan Letica =

Yugoslav politician

Commissioner of Finance of the Commissioner Government
- In office 30 April 1941 – 29 August 1941
- Prime Minister: Milan Aćimović
- Preceded by: Office established
- Succeeded by: Office abolished

Minister of Finance of the Government of National Salvation
- In office 29 August 1941 – 26 October 1943
- Prime Minister: Milan Nedić
- Preceded by: Office established
- Succeeded by: Ljubiša M. Bojić

Personal details
- Born: 23 October 1884 Valjevo, Kingdom of Serbia
- Died: 19 September 1945 (aged 60) Belgrade, People's Republic of Serbia, SFR Yugoslavia
- Party: People's Radical Party (1918–1935) Yugoslav Radical Union (1936–1940) ZBOR (1940–1945)
- Spouse: Miša Ristić (1911–1945; his death)
- Children: 7
- Education: Complutense University of Madrid, and University of Belgrade
- Occupation: Lawyer
- Profession: Politician

Military service
- Allegiance: Kingdom of Serbia
- Branch/service: Royal Serbian Army
- Years of service: 1896–1918
- Rank: Soldier
- Battles/wars: Serbian Campaign of World War I: Salonika front

Dušan Letica (Serbian Cyrillic: Душан Летица; 23 October 1884 – 19 September 1945) was a Serbian lawyer, translator, and Axis Power collaborationist during World War II.
