= Harald Turner =

German war criminal and SS general (1891–1947)

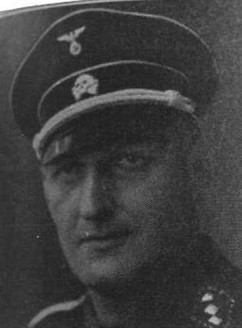
- Turner in 1933
- Born: 8 October 1891; Leun, Rhine Province, Kingdom of Prussia, German Empire
- Died: 9 March 1947 (aged 55); Belgrade, Federal People's Republic of Yugoslavia
- Cause of death: Execution
- Status: Deceased
- Convictions: War crimes Massacres, deportations and persecution of Jews and Roma in occupied Serbia
- Penalty: Death

Deputy Chief SS Race and Settlement Main Office
- In office 25 December 1943 – 5 September 1944

Chief of Military Administration Staff Territory of the Military Commander in Serbia
- In office April 1941 – 7 November 1942

District President Koblenz
- In office 13 May 1933 – 17 January 1936
- Preceded by: Walter von Sybel
- Succeeded by: Ernst von Heydebrand und der Lasa

Personal details
- Party: Nazi Party

Military service
- Allegiance: German Empire; Nazi Germany
- Branch/service: Imperial German Army; Freikorps; Schutzstaffel
- Years of service: 1908–1920; 1932–1945
- Rank: Hauptmann; SS-Gruppenführer and Generalleutnant of the Waffen-SS
- Battles/wars: World War I World War II

Harald Turner (8 October 1891 – 9 March 1947) was a German lawyer, SS general and convicted war criminal. As chief of staff of the German Military Administration in occupied Serbia from April 1941, he directed the murder of Serbian Jews and Romani people, including the mass shooting of hostages in reprisal for partisan attacks and the gassing of thousands of women and children from the Sajmište concentration camp. He later served as deputy chief of the SS Race and Settlement Main Office, overseeing Germanisation policy in the General Government and the occupied Soviet Union. Tried in Belgrade in February and March 1947, he was found guilty and executed on 9 March.

== Early life ==
The son of a military officer, Turner attended cadet schools, including the main Prussian military academy at Groß-Lichterfelde. He entered the Royal Prussian Army in 1908 as an infantry officer and fought in the First World War. He served in both combat and staff positions, was wounded and earned the Iron Cross, 1st and 2nd class. From December 1918 to May 1919 he served as the adjutant to the commander of the Wesel fortress, and from then to March 1920 he served in the Freikorps "Wesel". He was discharged from the military in April 1920 with the rank of Hauptmann. He then entered the Prussian civil service and worked in the pension offices at Wesel, Mainz, Bad Kreuznach and Trier until 1926, becoming in April of that year a Regierungsrat (Government Councilor). From 1927 to 1930 he studied at the University of Giessen and obtained his Doctor of Law degree. In April 1929, he became the finance commissioner for utilities in the Saar Territory.

== Nazi party and SS career ==
In January 1930, Turner became a member of the Nazi Party (membership number 970,460) and, in April 1932, also a member of the SS (SS member number 34,799). After the Nazi seizure of power, he was appointed the Regierungspräsident (District President) in Koblenz on 13 May 1933, a post he held until January 1936. On 1 February, he was promoted to Ministerial Director in the Prussian Ministry of Finance as head of the personnel and payroll department, a post he would hold until 1945. In April 1934 he joined the Sicherheitsdienst (SD) Main Office (later, part of the Reich Security Main Office, RSHA). Turner became a Major in the army reserves in February 1937. After the incorporation of the Sudetenland into Germany in October 1938, he served there until December, first as the chief of civil administration, and then as the representative of the District President of Egerland with headquarters in Karlsbad (today, Karlovy Vary). In 1938, Prussian Minister President Hermann Göring appointed Turner to the Prussian State Council where he served until the fall of the Nazi regime.

After the invasion of Poland, Turner worked from September 1939 as chief of the military administration's staff in the General Government and, in July 1940, was sent to occupied France to work in the same capacity. In April 1941, Turner was made head of the German military administration's staff in Serbia and attained his final promotion to SS-Gruppenführer in September. After Franz Böhme was appointed as the military commander of occupied Serbia, Turner, on 24 September 1941, proposed methods to deal with the uprising in Serbia that had broken out in July. One of his suggestions was a "cleansing action in Podrinje", which was approved by Böhme. On 24 September, the brutal Mačva operation began, which saw entire settlements razed and innocent civilians killed or interned in camps north of the Sava river. During November, Turner additionally arrested 700 Serbian intellectuals in Belgrade. On 2 October 1941, 21 German soldiers from a communications unit were ambushed and killed. Turner then selected 2,100 Jews and communists from the concentration camps at Šabac and Belgrade for execution in reprisal. Turner and military commander Franz Böhme were also responsible for the Kraljevo massacre and the Kragujevac massacre that same month, in which thousands of Jews were shot.

Turner suggested that all Serbian Jews be deported to Romania or the General Government. SS-Obersturmbannführer Adolf Eichmann, head of the RSHA sub-department that handled Jewish affairs and evacuations, sent a reply indicating that those places could not even take all the German Jews, and he proposed that Turner focus on killing the Serbian Jews by shooting them. Soon after Turner received this response, he began the rapid and ruthless massacre of Serbian Jews and Roma. In an order dated 26 October 1941, Turner wrote that Jews and Roma represented a threat to public order and security, the more so as the Jewish intelligentsia had caused the war and had to be destroyed. Turner alleged, without evidence, that Roma men were working with the Jews in partisan warfare and were responsible for many atrocities, and several thousands were killed. Just six months later, on 11 April 1942, he reported to Karl Wolff, chief of the Personal Staff Reichsführer-SS, about the murders that were carried out:

Already some months ago, I shot dead all the Jews I could get my hands on in this area, concentrated all the Jewish women and children in a camp and with the help of the SD got my hands on a "delousing van", that in about 14 days to 4 weeks will have brought about the definitive clearing out of the camp …

By the beginning of May 1942, approximately 7,500 to 8,000 inmates of the Sajmište concentration camp, mostly Jewish women and children, had been killed by the gas van. On August 29 of the same year, during a presentation given to Generaloberst Alexander Löhr, the Wehrmacht Commander-in-Chief Southeast, he boasted: "Serbia is the only country that has solved the Jewish question and the Gypsy question".

In April 1942, Turner was losing the support of higher ups in the Third Reich for his policies, which resulted in his organizing visits to various parts of Serbia to secure the support of local administrators. Turner realized that his ideas in Serbia could not be easily achieved because of the opposition of August Meyszner, the recently appointed Higher SS and Police Leader in Serbia. Löhr thought that to fight Yugoslav partisans effectively, the various military commands and police branches should be put under the control of the Military Commander of Serbia. However, the constant arguments between Meyszner and Franz Neuhausen on one side and Turner on the other made this hard to achieve. Turner's position in Serbia became untenable after September, when Meyszner demanded and obtained from Paul Bader control over local administrators. Meyszner considered Turner "a friend of Serbs" because of his support of Milan Nedić, the head of the Serbian puppet government, despite Turner's brutal approach to dealing with the Serbs in the occupied territory. On 9 November Turner was recalled from his position in Serbia.

In December 1943, Turner was appointed Deputy Chief of the Race and Settlement Main Office at SS headquarters in Berlin, under SS-Obergruppenführer Richard Hildebrandt. At the end of January 1944, he was granted the rank of Generalleutnant of the Waffen-SS.

== Dismissal, capture, trial and execution ==
In July 1944, when speaking at the SS-Junker School at Bad Tölz, Turner made derogatory remarks about Reichsleiter Martin Bormann and about the relationship between the Party and the SS. On 19 August 1944, he was placed on leave and, on 5 September, was relieved of his position at SS headquarters and was sent to the front. At the end of the war in Europe, Turner was captured by the British as a prisoner of war and was extradited to Yugoslavia in October 1946. Turner stood trial for war crimes before a military court in Belgrade between 27 February and 3 March 1947, was found guilty and executed on 9 March.

== SS ranks ==
SS officer ranks
Date	Rank
12 June 1933	SS-Untersturmführer
20 August 1933	SS-Sturmbannführer
20 April 1934	SS-Obersturmbannführer
20 May 1934	SS-Standartenführer
30 January 1936	SS-Oberführer
30 January 1939	SS-Brigadeführer
27 September 1941	SS-Gruppenführer
30 January 1944	Generalleutnant der Waffen-SS

== Sources ==
- Bartrop, Paul R.; Grimm, Eve E. (2019). Perpetrating The Holocaust: Leaders, Enablers, and Collaborators. ABC-CLIO. ISBN 978-1-440-85897-0.
- Evans, Richard J. (2009). The Third Reich at War. New York: Penguin Press. ISBN 978-1-594-20206-3.
- Glišić, Venceslav (1970). Teror i zločini nacističke Nemačke u Srbiji 1941–1945 [Terror and Crimes of Nazi Germany in Serbia 1941–1945] (in Serbo-Croatian). Belgrade: Rad. OCLC 9151138.
- Klee, Ernst (2007). Das Personenlexikon zum Dritten Reich. Wer war was vor und nach 1945. Frankfurt-am-Main: Fischer-Taschenbuch-Verlag. ISBN 978-3-596-16048-8.
- Lilla, Joachim (2005). Der Preußische Staatsrat 1921–1933: Ein biographisches Handbuch. Düsseldorf: Droste Verlag. ISBN 978-3-770-05271-4.
- Schiffer Publishing Ltd., ed. (2000). SS Officers List: SS-Standartenführer to SS-Oberstgruppenführer (As of 30 January 1942). Schiffer Military History Publishing. ISBN 9781440858963.
