= Milorad Dimitrijević =

Serbian geologist

Milorad D. Dimitrijević (1926 in Ruma, Serbia, Kingdom of Serbs, Croats and Slovenes – September 29, 2009, in Belgrade, Serbia) was a Serbian geologist, an expert in geological mapping, structural geology, remote sensing and geotectonic and full professor at the Faculty of Mining and Geology in Belgrade. He introduced photogeology and modern structural geology into Serbian geology and is the creator of the concept of a modern geological map in Yugoslavia and co-author of several pages of the Basic Geological Map of the former Yugoslavia (SFRY).

== Career ==
After the end of the Second World War, in 1946 Dimitrijević enrolled in the Mining Department of the Technical College in Belgrade. He graduated in 1950. After graduating, he got a job at the Technical College, and in 1956 at the Faculty of Mining and Geology in Belgrade.

He received his doctorate in 1957 and became an assistant professor in the same year. He became an associate professor in 1960 and a full professor in 1967. During his teaching career, he taught general geology, structural geology, photogeology, and geological mapping.

He founded the Laboratory for Geological Mapping Methods (LMGK) and is credited with the development of geological mapping and related disciplines in the former Yugoslavia. At the Geological Department of the Faculty of Mining and Geology, he founded the Department of Geological Mapping Methods and was its head until 1987, when he retired at his own request.

He devoted most of his work to geological mapping. He also dealt with many other aspects of geology: tectonic and geotectonic studies, structural research, sedimentological research, studies of turbidite basins, as well as remote sensing. He has published over 170 papers, books, textbooks and manuals in the country and in the US, Germany, the USSR, Hungary, Poland, Romania, France, the Netherlands, Switzerland, Italy, Iran, and others. He began his geological career by mapping metamorphics. The theses he gave in his works were the basis for the first detailed elaboration of the process of stigmatization.

He is the creator of the concept of a modern geological map in the SFRY, which is also accepted in Europe. He managed the largest and most significant undertaking in the history of the geology of Yugoslavia - the production of the Basic Geological Map at a scale of 1: 100,000.

Dimitrijević also did research in the field of geotectonics. He accepted and developed the idea of mobility and set up a new model of the Dinarides based on plate tectonics. He has also published numerous papers on ophiolite melange, genesis and types of melange, on the structure of calcareous bodies within melange, and others. He is the only geologist from the former SFRY whose works are included in the world's most important series "Benchmark papers in Geology".

He is the author of the comprehensive book "Geology of Yugoslavia", published in Serbian and English. He is the editor of the edition "Geological Atlas of Serbia" of 16 thematic maps measuring 1: 2,000,000.

Together with his colleague Boris Sikošek, he is the author of an article on the geology of FR Yugoslavia within the capital work on the geology of Europe and Asia, "Encyclopedia of European and Asian Regional Geology."

== Selected works ==
- Sedimentne teksture u turbiditima by Mara N. Dimitrijević, Milorad D. Dimitrijević, Bogdan Radošević, 1967;
- Geology of Kerman Region, 1973;
- Geološko kartiranje, 1978;
- Geologija Jugoslavije, 1995;
- Geology of Yugoslavia, 1997.
