= Einsatzgruppe Serbia =

Military grouping

Einsatzgruppe Serbia was a grouping of the German Schutzstaffel

Einsatzgruppe Serbia (EG Serbia), initially named Einsatzgruppe Yugoslavia (EG Yugoslavia), was a German Schutzstaffel (SS) grouping in the German-occupied territory of Serbia during World War II. Directly responsible to the Reich Security Main Office (German: Reichssicherheitshauptamt, RSHA) in Berlin, EG Serbia consisted of representatives of the various offices (German: Ämter) of the RSHA, particularly Amt IV – the Gestapo (Secret State Police), Amt V – the Kriminalpolizei (Criminal Police, or Kripo), and Amt VI – the Ausland-Sicherheitsdienst (Foreign Intelligence Service, or Ausland-SD). It also controlled the 64th Reserve Police Battalion of the Ordnungspolizei (Order Police, Orpo). While formally responsible to the Military Commander in Serbia via the head of the administrative branch of the military headquarters of the occupied territory, the chief of EG Serbia reported directly to his superiors in Berlin.

== Background ==
=== Pre-war activities in Yugoslavia ===
In 1936, the chief of the Belgrade General Police, Dragomir Jovanović attended the International Police Conference in Berlin, along with two subordinates. Jovanović's Belgrade General Police were the political police of the Belgrade City Administration, and had been closely involved in the suppression of the Communist Party of Yugoslavia since it was banned in 1920. At the conference, Jovanović supported the motion of the Polish delegates to extend the activities of the International Criminal Police Commission to cooperation against international communism. He also supported the candidature of the director of the German Gestapo, Reinhard Heydrich, to be president of the commission, and had discussions with Gestapo officials about the fight against international communism. In January 1937, Jovanović again travelled to Berlin, this time with Milan Aćimović, the Belgrade City Administrator, who was also a confidant of the Prime Minister of Yugoslavia, Milan Stojadinović. The two Yugoslavs met with Reichsführer-SS and Chief of German Police in the Reich Ministry of the Interior, Heinrich Himmler, and Heydrich, and agreed on cooperation and the exchange of police liaison officers between Yugoslavia and Germany.

In early January 1938, SS-Sturmbannführer (SS-Major) Hans Helm was appointed as a police attaché to the German diplomatic mission in Belgrade. Helm was a protege of the senior Gestapo official, Heinrich Müller, and his appointment to the position was encouraged by Jovanović and Aćimović, whom he had met when they visited Berlin. The German ambassador, Viktor von Heeren, was a former member of the diplomatic corps of the pre-Nazi Weimar Republic, and was wary of Helm and his role, and concerned about what impact the Gestapo official would have on Germany's relationship with the Stojadinović government. In December 1938, Aćimović was appointed as Minister of the Interior in the Stojadinović cabinet, but in early February of the following year, Stojadinović fell from power, and Aćimović also lost his portfolio. At the same time, Jovanović was transferred to an advisory role in the Ministry of the Interior. However, both men maintained their contact with Helm, with Jovanović allegedly permitting a secret German Abwehr (military intelligence) radio to be installed in his home. Helm maintained contact with several Germanophile officials within the Belgrade City Administration, including a White émigré Russian, Nikolaj Gubarev, an agent with the anti-communist Section IV of the Belgrade General Police. Helm cultivated Gubarev as an informant, part of an intelligence network he established throughout the country to collect political and military information, including information about British and French intelligence services operating in Yugoslavia. Helm's connection to Gubarev was known by the intelligence staff of the Supreme Command of the Royal Yugoslav Army, and as a result, in late 1939, Gubarev was transferred away from Belgrade. In addition to his intelligence work, Helm also collected commercial information, helping a German company obtain a concession to explore for oil in Yugoslavia ahead of British interests. On 27 September 1939, the Gestapo and its parent organisation, the Sicherheitspolizei (Security Police, or SiPo), was placed under the umbrella of the new Reich Security Main Office (German: Reichssicherheitshauptamt, RSHA), now commanded by Heydrich, and the Gestapo became Amt (Office) IV of the RSHA, with Müller as its chief.

Helm was under strict instructions not to deal with any people or organisations that were in opposition to the Yugoslav government. This responsibility fell to SS-Sturmbannführer Karl Kraus, who belonged to Amt VI of the RSHA, the Ausland-Sicherheitsdienst (Foreign Intelligence Service, or Ausland-SD). Kraus arrived in Belgrade soon after the RSHA was formed, under the cover that he was an economic adviser to the German Transportation Bureau in Belgrade. The German Transportation Bureau was an organisation established to promote the interests of German transportation companies, including the Deutsche Reichsbahn (German State Railway), the airline Deutsche Lufthansa, and the shipping lines Hamburg America Line and Norddeutscher Lloyd. The director of the German Transportation Bureau was the official representative of the Nazi Party in Yugoslavia, Franz Neuhausen. Kraus was responsible for organising fifth column activities among the ethnic Germans of Yugoslavia, and ran lectures for them at the former Czechoslovak embassy in Belgrade. Neuhausen used his considerable influence to assist Kraus in his duties. On one occasion in April 1940, Kraus and his assistant, SS-Sturmbannführer Adolf Nassenstein, were travelling to Dubrovnik on the Adriatic coast without permission from the Yugoslav authorities and were arrested by the Yugoslav police in Mostar. They were charged and orders were issued for their expulsion from Yugoslavia. Neuhausen arranged for their release and for the charges to be dropped and the expulsion orders cancelled. Kraus cultivated a network of informants which included members of the Yugoslav government, the fascist Yugoslav National Movement (Serbo-Croatian: Združena borbena organizacija rada, Zbor) of Dimitrije Ljotić, the Russian White émigré community, and ethnic Germans. One of Kraus' most significant informants was Tanasije Dinić. In the spring of 1940, Nassenstein was transferred to Zagreb to consolidate contacts among Croatian separatists and counter the work of the British and French intelligence services there.

=== The Tripartite Pact and the coup d'état ===
Following the 1938 Anschluss between Germany and Austria, Yugoslavia came to share a border with the Third Reich and fell under increasing pressure as her neighbours aligned themselves with the Axis powers. In April 1939, Italy opened a second frontier with Yugoslavia when it invaded and occupied neighbouring Albania. At the outbreak of World War II, the Yugoslav government declared its neutrality. Between September and November 1940, Hungary and Romania joined the Tripartite Pact, aligning themselves with the Axis, and Italy invaded Greece. From that time, Yugoslavia was almost completely surrounded by the Axis powers and their satellites, and her neutral stance toward the war became strained. In late February 1941, Bulgaria joined the Pact. The following day, German troops entered Bulgaria from Romania, closing the ring around Yugoslavia. Intending to secure his southern flank for the impending attack on the Soviet Union, Adolf Hitler began placing heavy pressure on Yugoslavia to join the Axis. On 25 March 1941, after some delay, the Yugoslav government conditionally signed the Pact. Two days later, a group of pro-Western, Serbian nationalist Royal Yugoslav Army Air Force officers deposed the country's regent, Prince Paul, in a bloodless coup d'état, placed his teenaged nephew Peter on the throne, and brought to power a "government of national unity" led by General Dušan Simović. The coup enraged Hitler, who immediately ordered the country's invasion. When the coup occurred, Helm was visiting Berlin, and Kraus was in Belgrade.

== Establishment ==
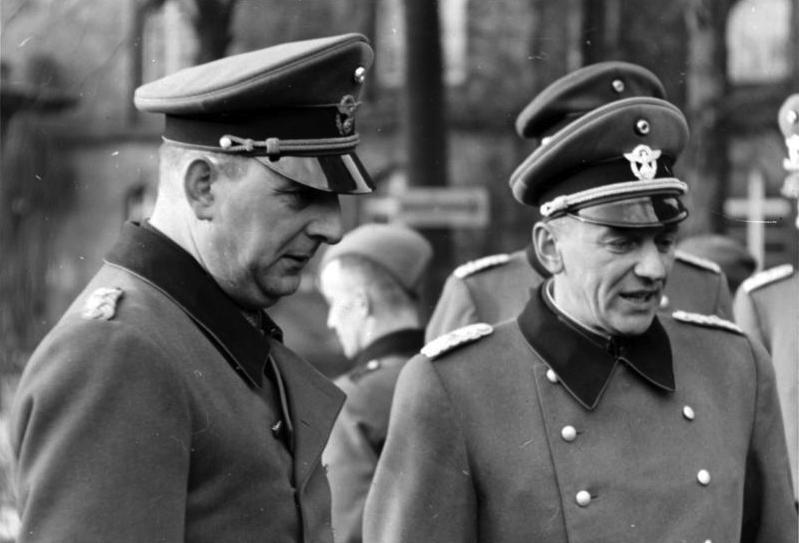
Wilhelm Fuchs (right) with the head of the Ordnungspolizei, SS-Obergruppenführer Kurt Daluege. Fuchs was appointed as chief of EG Yugoslavia.

Immediately following the coup, Heydrich summoned SS-Sturmbannführer Walter Schellenberg, the acting head of the Ausland-SD, and ordered him to compile a list of all Yugoslavs who were opposed to Nazi Germany, so they could be arrested during and after the pending invasion. This list was assembled hastily and contained a number of errors, but quickly came to comprise over 4,000 names. Heydrich then appointed SS-Standartenführer (SS-Colonel) Wilhelm Fuchs to lead Einsatzgruppe Yugoslavia (EG Yugoslavia), consisting of police and security detachments, which would be responsible for arresting those on the list. Fuchs had been the head of a SD detachment in occupied Poland. On 1 April, Fuchs went to Vienna, where he gathered about 60 SD and Gestapo officials, including experts in Yugoslavian affairs such as Helm and SS-Sturmbannführer Wilhelm Beissner, who was head of the Yugoslav section of the Ausland-SD office in Berlin. When the German-led Axis invasion of Yugoslavia commenced on 6 April, Fuchs and the main body of EG Yugoslavia were in Graz with the German 2nd Army, and a smaller Einsatzkommando (EK) led by SS-Sturmbannführer Jonak was with German troops preparing to invade Yugoslavia from Romania. On 8 April, Fuchs and his men were in Maribor, and commenced arresting people on the list. However, the rapid success of the invasion meant that by 13 April, he was in Zagreb, so he quickly formed a second EK under Beissner to operate in the newly created Axis puppet state, the Independent State of Croatia (Croatian: Nezavisna Država Hrvatska, NDH).

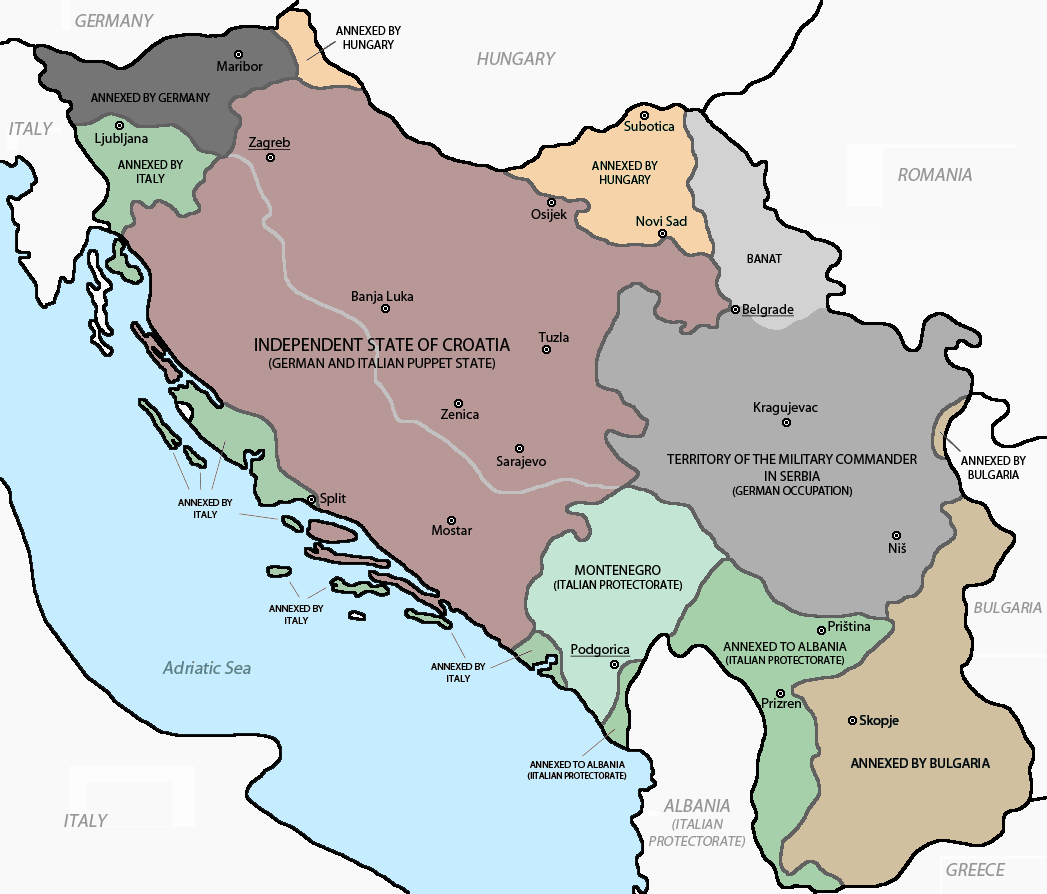
Map showing the partition of Yugoslavia after the Axis invasion

German forces entered Belgrade on 12 April, two days later, Jonak and his EK had arrived, where they were met by Kraus, who had weathered the bombing of Belgrade in the basement of the former Czechoslovak embassy. The next day, the remainder of Fuchs' EG Yugoslavia arrived in the capital. The young King Peter and his government fled the country on 15 April, and Yugoslav forces surrendered unconditionally two days later. On that day, Heydrich arrived in Belgrade and met with Fuchs and the rest of the EG Yugoslavia staff, including Helm and Kraus. Heydrich explained that Germany and its allies were partitioning Yugoslavia. Some Yugoslav territory was annexed by its Axis neighbors, Hungary, Bulgaria and Italy. The Germans had engineered and supported the creation of the NDH, which roughly comprised most of the pre-war Banovina Croatia, along with rest of present-day Bosnia and Herzegovina and some adjacent territory. The Italians, Hungarians and Bulgarians occupied other parts of Yugoslavian territory. Germany did not annex any Yugoslav territory, but occupied northern parts of present-day Slovenia and stationed occupation troops in the northern half of the NDH. The German-occupied part of Slovenia was divided into two administrative areas that were placed under the administration of the Gauleiters of the neighboring Reichsgau Kärnten and Reichsgau Steiermark.

The remaining territory, which consisted of Serbia proper, the northern part of Kosovo (around Kosovska Mitrovica), and the Banat was occupied by the Germans and placed under the administration of a German military government. This was due to the key rail and riverine transport routes that passed through it, and its valuable resources, particularly non-ferrous metals. Heydrich appointed Helm as head of the Gestapo in the occupied Serbian territory, and Kraus as the chief of EK Belgrade, with Fuchs remaining as head of EG Yugoslavia, with primary responsibility for the German-occupied territory of Serbia. Fuchs was also temporarily responsible for the three EKs established within the NDH, headquartered at Zagreb, Sarajevo and Osijek. Jonak was given responsibility for exploiting the Yugoslav archives on behalf of the RSHA.

== Operations ==
Heydrich returned to Berlin on the same day, and EG Yugoslavia immediately got to work, establishing EK Belgrade in the district prison on King Alexander I Street, and sending SS-Sonderkommandos (ad hoc task forces, or SS-SKs) into the interior of the occupied territory on various tasks. One of these SS-SKs, commanded by SS-Sturmbannführer Karl Hintze, located the Patriarch of the Serbian Orthodox Church, Gavrilo V, whose name was on the list given to Fuchs. He was sheltering in Italian occupied Montenegro at the Ostrog Monastery, and was arrested and transferred to the Belgrade prison. The same SS-SK seized hundreds of millions of Yugoslav dinar notes and some gold that the fleeing Yugoslav government had been unable to take with it. Within the NDH, EK Sarajevo was established under SS-Sturmbannführer Alfred Heinrich, and in Bulgarian annexed Skoplje another EK was established under SS-Hauptsturmführer Rupert Mandl. In Hungarian-annexed territory, SS-Obersturmführer Karl Pamer led another EK at Novi Sad, and in the ethnic German-administered Banat, SS-Obersturmführer Zoeller set up his EK initially at Pančevo, and later moved it to Veliki Bečkerek. In the first weeks of the occupation, EK Belgrade's SS-Obersturmführer Fritz Müller led a SS-SK in searching for those on the list, but he lacked the manpower for the task, and relied heavily on the Abwehr and Geheime Feldpolizei (Secret Field Police), to locate and arrest the wanted people. This search for wanted persons was the main initial task of EG Yugoslavia, and resulted in the sending of many arrested people to the Gestapo in Graz, or to concentration camps in the Third Reich. The roundup included diplomatic staff in various posts, including Berlin, despite this being a breach of diplomatic immunity. Documents obtained from the Yugoslav embassy in Berlin by Schellenberg's men indicated that the Yugoslav military attaché, Pukovnik (Colonel) Vladimir Vauhnik, had been obtaining information from the top echelons of the Wehrmacht, as he had advised Belgrade of detailed information about the Axis invasion two days before it began.

As soon as the invasion was over, Kraus became aware that former Yugoslav Prime Minister Dragiša Cvetković was seeking to return to power under German authority. Based on his work in Yugoslavia before the invasion, Kraus wrote a report recommending against this course of action.
