= Gošići =

Gošići Гошићи
- Village
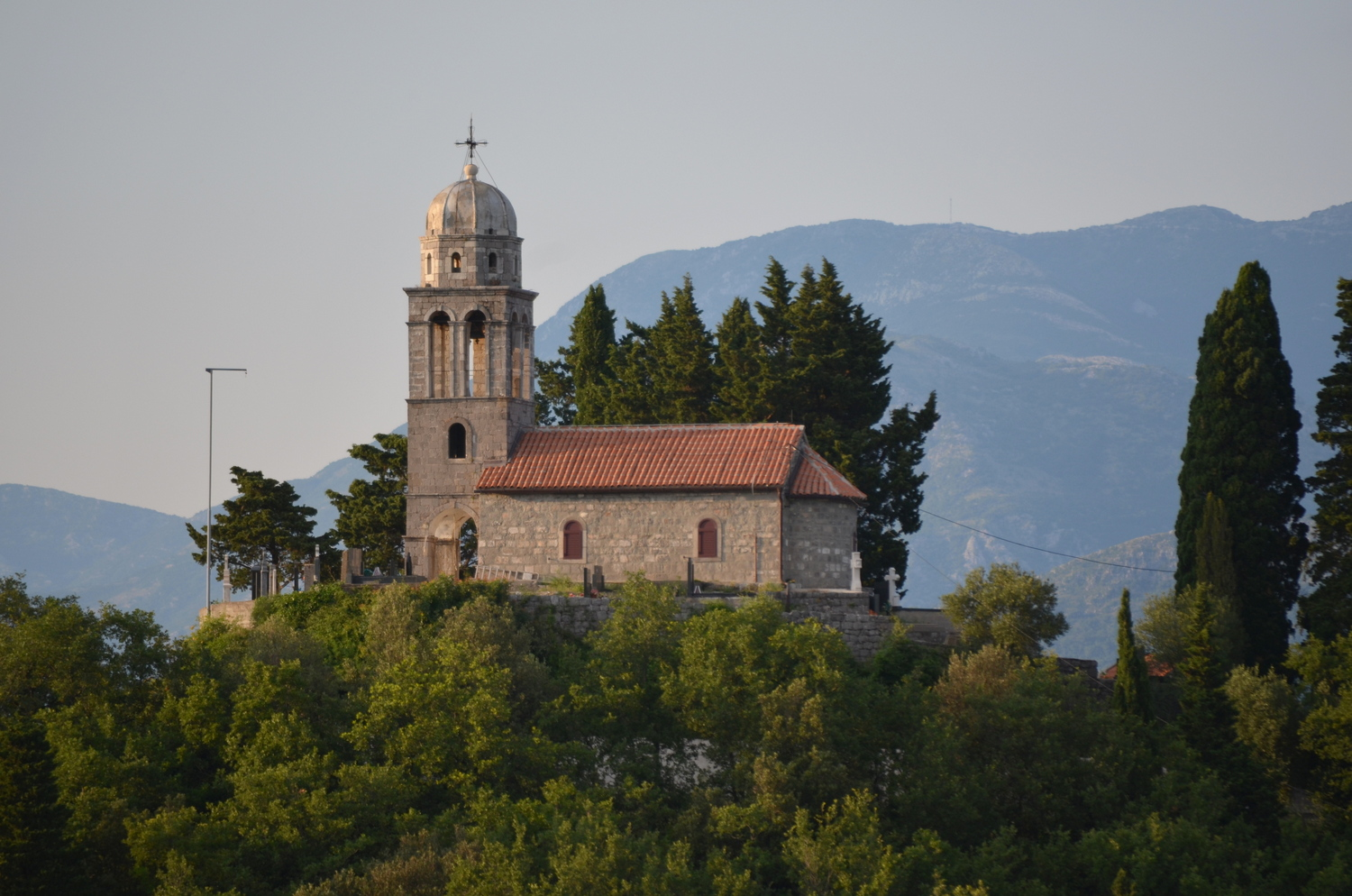
- St. Luka's church in Gošići, Montenegro

- Location within Montenegro
- Coordinates: 42.397482°N 18.662392°E
- Country: Montenegro
- Region: Coastal
- Municipality: Tivat

Population (2011)
  - Total: 212
- Time zone: UTC+1 (CET)
  - Summer (DST): UTC+2 (CEST)

Gošići (Montenegrin: Гошићи) is a village in the municipality of Tivat, Montenegro. It is located on the Luštica.

== Demographics ==
According to the 2011 census, it had a population of 212 people.

Ethnicity in 2011
Ethnicity	Number	Percentage
Serbs	119	56.1%
Montenegrins	41	19.3%
Croats	7	3.3%
Russians	6	2.8%
other/undeclared	39	18.4%
Total	212	100%
