= Wilhelm Fuchs =

German SS officer (1898–1947)

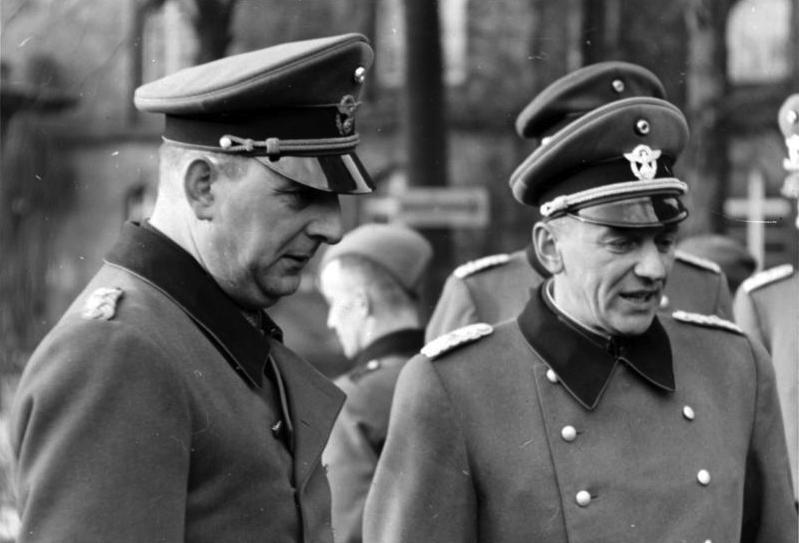
- Kurt Daluege (left) and Wilhelm Fuchs (1940)

Personal details
- Born: 1 September 1898 Mannheim, Grand Duchy of Baden, German Empire
- Died: 24 January 1947 (aged 48) Belgrade, Yugoslavia
- Education: Ph.D.
- Alma mater: University of Leipzig
- Occupation: Agriculturist

Military service
- Allegiance: German Empire; Nazi Germany
- Branch/service: Imperial German Army; Schutzstaffel
- Years of service: 1914–1918; 1932–1945
- Rank: SS-Oberführer and Oberst of Police
- Unit: Sicherheitspolizei (SiPo) and Sicherheitsdienst (SD)
- Commands: Einsatzgruppe Serbia; Einsatzgruppe A Einsatzgruppe E Commander, SiPo and SD (Serbia, 1941–1942); Ostland, (1944)
- Awards: Clasp to the Iron Cross, 2nd class
- Criminal information
- Conviction: War crimes
- Penalty: Death by hanging

Wilhelm Fuchs (1 September 1898 – 24 January 1947) was a German SS-Oberführer and Oberst of police in Nazi Germany. During the Second World War, he led the Einsatzgruppe Serbia and was the commander of the Sicherheitspolizei (Security Police) and the SD (BdS) in occupied Serbia. He was also the commander of Einsatzkommando 3 and Einsatzgruppe A, as well as the BdS of the Reichskommissariat Ostland in the occupied Soviet Union. After the end of the war, he was implicated in the deaths of tens of thousands, and he was tried, convicted of war crimes and hanged in Yugoslavia.

== Early life and peacetime SS career ==
Fuchs was born in Mannheim and, after earning his Abitur, he entered the Imperial German Army and fought in the First World War, earning the Iron Cross, 2nd class. He then studied agricultural science at the University of Leipzig and received a doctorate in 1929.

On 1 April 1932, Fuchs joined the Nazi Party (membership number 1,038,061) and, on 1 December 1932, the Schutzstaffel (SS) (membership number 62,760). After the Nazi seizure of power, Fuchs became an adjutant to Reichsbauernführer (Reich Farmers Leader) Walther Darré from April 1933 and was commissioned an SS-Untersturmführer on 11 July 1933. He was assigned to the SS Race and Settlement Main Office, then headed by Darré. He was rapidly promoted, rising three ranks to SS-Sturmbannführer by May 1934. In 1936, he transferred to the SD Main Office, under Reinhard Heydrich. From October 1937, he was assigned to the SS-Oberabschnitt (main section) in Dresden. His next assignment was as the Inspekteur der Sicherheitspolizei und des SD (IdS) in Braunschweig, and he was promoted to SS-Standartenführer on 20 April 1938.

== Second World War ==
From 1940 onward, Fuchs was assigned as an SD officer to the Commander of the Security Police and SD (Befehlshaber der Sicherheitspolizei und des SD, BdS) in the General Government, Bruno Streckenbach. Following the German attack on the Kingdom of Yugoslavia on 6 April 1941, Fuchs was named BdS for Serbia and was assigned the leadership of the Einsatzgruppe Serbia. One of his first acts was to order the registration of all Jews in Belgrade. His proclamation stated that anyone not registering would be shot. Yugoslav partisans in July began a rebellion against the German occupiers by acts of sabotage, destroying railway lines, telephone lines and other infrastructure as well as ambushing German troops. During Fuchs tenure in Serbia, the Wehrmacht High Command issued the so-called "Keitel order" of 16 September 1941, which mandated executing 50 to 100 civilian hostages in reprisal for each German killed. When discussing the implementation of the reprisal policy, Fuchs successfully advocated for including already incarcerated male Serbian Jews as victims. By the end of the year, due to reprisals then more brutal than anywhere else in occupied Europe, the rebellion in Serbia largely had been quelled. Fuchs was replaced as BdS in January 1942 by SS-Standartenführer Emanuel Schäfer.

Fuchs was promoted to SS-Oberführer in 1942. Sent to Riga in the Reichskommissariat Ostland, he served as the acting SS and Police Leader in the Generalbezirk Lettland in June 1942, in place of SS-Brigadeführer Walther Schröder. Returning to his post in Braunschweig, he was appointed the acting Higher SS and Police Leader "Mitte" in place of SS-Obergruppenführer Günther Pancke from 8 July to 14 September 1943. On 15 September 1943, Fuchs returned to the east as Führer of Einsatzkommando 3, which he commanded until 6 May 1944. He then advanced to the leadership of Einsatzgruppe A and BdS in Ostland until 17 October 1944. His next assignment was as the last commander of Einsatzgruppe E in Croatia between October and November 1944. In this role he was co-responsible for the murder of tens of thousands of people. During the war, Fuchs was awarded the Clasp to the Iron Cross, 2nd class.

== Post-war prosecution and death ==
After the end of the war, Fuchs was arrested and extradited to Yugoslavia. He was tried along with seventeen others for the deaths of 150,000 men, women and children, including 35,000 Jews, and was sentenced to death by the Supreme Military Court in Belgrade on 22 December 1946. Together with SS-Gruppenführer August Meyszner, the former Higher SS and Police Leader in Serbia, Fuchs was executed by hanging on 24 January 1947.

== SS and police ranks ==
SS and police ranks
Date	Rank
11 July 1933	SS-Untersturmführer
1 January 1934	SS-Obersturmführer
23 March 1934	SS-Hauptsturmführer
25 May 1934	SS-Sturmbannführer
20 April 1938	SS-Standartenführer und Oberst der Polizei
20 April 1942	SS-Oberführer und Oberst der Polizei

== See also ==
- The Holocaust in German-occupied Serbia

== Sources ==
- Klee, Ernst (2007). Das Personenlexikon zum Dritten Reich. Wer war was vor und nach 1945. Frankfurt-am-Main: Fischer-Taschenbuch-Verlag. ISBN 978-3-596-16048-8.
- Mazower, Mark (2008). Hitler's Empire: How the Nazis Ruled Europe. New York: The Penguin Press. ISBN 978-1-594-20188-2.
- Ramme, Alwin: Der Sicherheitsdienst der SS, Militärverlag Berlin 1970, S. 262.
- Schiffer Publishing Ltd., ed. (2000). SS Officers List: SS-Standartenführer to SS-Oberstgruppenführer (As of 30 January 1942). Schiffer Military History Publishing. ISBN 0-7643-1061-5.
- Wilhelm Fuchs Brief Biography (in Italian)
- Yerger, Mark C. (1997). The Allgemeine-SS: The Commands, Units and Leaders of the General SS. Schiffer Publishing Ltd. ISBN 0-7643-0145-4.
