= Jovan Šantrić =

Serbian teacher and activist (1874–1915)

Jovan Šantrić (Serbian Cyrillic: Јован Шантрић; c. 1874 – 18 July 1915) was a Serbian teacher and activist in Old Serbia was part of the Macedonian Struggle. He was one of the founders of the Serb Democratic League and took part in the First Assembly of Serbs in the Ottoman Empire, held from 2 to 11 February 1909 in Skopje, at a time when Serbs had a significant majority population in this part of the Balkans, but no national rights.

== Biography ==
Jovan Šantrić was born in Old Serbia in the city of Peć, then part of the Ottoman Empire, now part of Kosovo, into a well-to-do family. His father was Jevrem Gligorijević-Šantrić, Sultan Abdul Hamid's silversmith in Beşiktaş (a district of Istanbul). He eventually left Beşiktaş after the Young Turk Revolution and returned to his ancestral home in Peć to be closer to the Serbian Patriarchate of Peć, his cultural roots, and his people.

Gligorijević-Šantrić's brother Panteleimon Šantrić, a diplomat in the service of Imperial Russia at the time, was shot in the back of the head in 1911 by an Arnaut while walking in downtown Peć. From 1903 to the beginning of the First Balkan War in the Ottoman Empire, Serbian and Russian envoys were in constant danger.

=== Education and Career ===
Jovan Šantrić completed six grades of the Greek and Serbian elementary school in Beşiktaş. According to Ottoman estimations of 1882, Beşiktaş had a total population of 28,777, consisting of 10,753 Muslims, 9,248 Greeks (the word Greek meant those of the Eastern Orthodox confession like Russians, Serbs and Macedonians; not necessarily only Greeks) 4,897 Armenians, 3,057 Jews, 601 Catholics, 203 Bulgarians and 18 Latins.

Šantrić enrolled and graduated from the prestigious Galatasaray Lyceum – the school was personally recommended by Stojan Novaković, an old friend of Jovan's father. Bogdan Radenković was a classmate of Šantrić at the school.

After graduating, Šantrić taught at the Constantinople Serbian High School from the 1899–1900 school semester. From 1902 to 1906, he taught at the Skoplje Serbian High School and the Thessaloniki Serbian High School.

He was actively involved in the national movement of the Serbs in the Ottoman Empire. After the Young Turk Revolution in 1908, he was a delegate to the First Serbian Conference, held the week of the 10 to 15 August 1908 in Skopje, at which the Serb Democratic League was created in the Ottoman Empire. He was elected the following year as a deputy from Priština in the Assembly of the Ottoman Serbs in Constantinopole. In 1911, he became a member of the Court of First Instance in Prizren. He worked on a Serbian-Turkish dictionary together with Gligorije Elezović. Jovan Šantrić died in battle during the First World War on 18 July 1915 in Prizren.

== See also ==
- Serb Democratic League
- Bogdan Radenković
- David Dimitrijević
- Velimir Prelić
- Vasa Jovanović
- Gliša Elezović
- Grigoriy Shcherbina

== Sources ==
- Novakov, Alexandra Z. Middle Serbian School in the Ottoman Empire (1878 – 1912). Doctoral Dissertation. Novi Sad, University of Novi Sad. Faculty of Philosophy. Department of History, 2014. p. 323. (in Serbian)
- Serbian Democratic League in Otomaskoj Tsarevini. Manifesto - Record - Organization. Skopje, "Serbian Club" Edition, 1908. p. 6.
- Serbian-Croatian-Slovenian National Encyclopedia, book 4. Belgrade, 1929, p. 361.
