= David Dimitrijevic =

David Dimitrijević (Serbian Cyrillic: Давид Димитријевић; Gnjilane, Macedonia, then Ottoman Empire, 1874 (not 1883) - Skopje, Kingdom of Serbs, Croats and Slovenes, 23 April 1929) was a Serbian educator, national revolutionary and deputy.

== Early life ==
He was born in 1873 in Gnjilan, where he finished elementary school. As a fourth grade student at the Prizren Seminary, he was called to Skopje in 1891 by the then Serbian consul of Skopje, Vladimir Karić, because of an urgent need for a teacher in the new school in the village of Klinovac in Preševska kaza, on the border between Serbia and the Ottoman Empire. As a teacher, Dimitrijević was sent by the Skopje Consulate and the Skopje Serbian Orthodox Metropolitanate to the most sensitive places, where Serbian teachers faced danger from assassination by the VMRO committee. Until 1904, he worked as a teacher in Serbian schools in Bašino Selo near Veles, Zletovo and Kriva Palanka.

== Serbian Chetnik action ==
During the Serbian Chetnik campaign in 1904/1905, he was the manager of Serbian Veles schools. He significantly influenced Jovan Babunski, then a teacher in Veles, to defect to the Chetnik company. Due to Babunski's defiance, Dimitrijević was arrested, but he was released after the intervention of Serbian diplomacy. During the campaign, he was one of the most important organizational workers. From 1906, he was publicly the manager of the Serbian schools in Kumanovo, and secretly the president of the Kumanovo committee of the Serbian Chetnik organization, under code name Ljuborad. Because of his work with the companies, he was arrested and sentenced to life imprisonment, but he was soon pardoned due to Russian diplomacy. In 1908, he became president of the Central Board of the Serbian Chetnik organization in Skopje.

== Cultural-political work ==
He participated in the work of the First Serbian Conference of Ottoman Serbs, in August 1908 in Skopje, after the Young Turk Revolution. Even before the conference, he was elected as a member of the Provisional Central Committee of the Ottoman Serbs, that is, the Serbian political organization in the Ottoman Empire. After the Young Turk Revolution, he founded the Vardar newspaper in 1908, the Serbian national organization's organ in the Ottoman Empire. Dimitrijević led the paper until it was banned by Turkish authorities in 1910, when he started the paper Zakonitost. In the same year as Vardar newspaper was published, he founded the first Serbian printing house and bookstore in Skopje.

== Wars and Liberation ==
He participated in the First World War with Secretary of National Defense Milan Vasić. After liberation, he lived in Skopje as a retired teacher. He was elected as a Skopje MP in 1925.

== See also ==
- Serb Democratic League
- Bogdan Radenković
- Jovan Šantrić
- Velimir Prelić
- Vasa Jovanović
- Gliša Elezović
