= First Belgrade Gymnasium =

Coordinates: 44°49′16″N 20°27′55″E

- Прва београдска гимназија Prva beogradska gimnazija
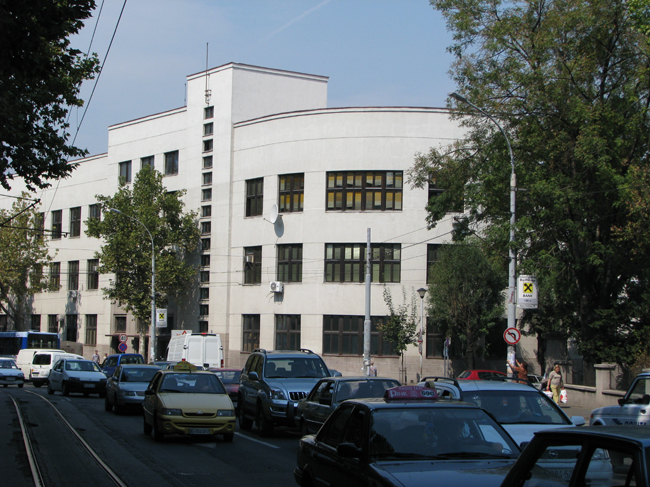
- Car Dušan Street 61; Belgrade; Serbia

Information
- Type: Public
- Established: 1839
- Language: Serbian
- Campus: Urban
- Website: www.prvabeogim.edu.rs

First Belgrade Gymnasium (Serbian: Прва београдска гимназија, romanized: Prva beogradska gimnazija) is a gymnasium (Central European type of grammar school) with a long tradition, founded in 1839 in Belgrade, Serbia. Since 1938, it is situated in the center of the city, on 61 Cara Dušana Street. The Church of St. Alexander Nevsky is located next to the school.

In October 1838, Kragujevac was the capital of Serbia. But despite it being the main cultural center at the time, Miloš Obrenović decided for First Belgrade Gymnasium (grammar school) to be founded in Belgrade, in an area called Dorćol (Dort-yol). The school was instituted on 18 June 1839. At that time, it was located on Jug Bogdan's Street number 26, which was the residence of Nikola Selaković. At the very beginning, it had only two grades, but in the next four years, the school's system was significantly upgraded so at the end, it had a total of five grades. It could be said that in the 1842–43 school year, the school actually became a real gymnasium.

The first school professors were Vasilije Berara and Mihajlo Popović, who functioned as the school's headmaster as well. According to a law from 1844, and thanks to Jovan Sterija Popović, teachings and classes in the school were reformed, so that the 6th grade was actually added to the school's system. With this addition, First Belgrade Gymnasium received the same status like other European higher class schools. That year, the school got its first library.

== History ==
After the First World War, it was named the First Male Real Gymnasium in Belgrade. Since it was merged with the Fourth Women's High School in 1959, it changed its name to the First Belgrade High School. During the period of directed education, it was called the Educational Organization "Moša Pijade", but in 1990 it was returned to its old name First Belgrade High School. The gymnasium started operating at Jug Bogdanova 26, in a house that was leased from Nikola Selaković, after which it often changed its location.

During the school year 1844/45. the school moved into the Konak of Princess Ljubica, from where school took place during the 1846/47 school year. Later it moves to the surroundings of the Saborna Crkva, to the building of the current Faculty of Applied Arts and to Ulica Kralja Petra No. 4.

In June 1858, Prince Petar publicly took the exams he had studied that year at this place. Among others, Vuk Karadžić was also present. In 1863, the first Belgrade high school solved the problem of its accommodation more permanently based on the gift of Captain Miša Anastasijevićc, i.e. it was housed in the Captain Miša building, together with the Great School, the Library, the Museum and the Society of Serbian Literature.

As the school became cramped due to the increasing number of students in the Big School, from the beginning of the school year 1898/99. until 1904. The First Belgrade High School was housed in three buildings: the building at 4 Kralja Petra Street, the Belgrade Realka building and the building near the Vaznenjenska Church (the building of the discontinued Third Belgrade High School). In this period, the Gymnasium had 72 professors and a large number of students.

In 1905, the First Belgrade High School moved into the leased "Dom Svetog Sava" at Cara Dušana Street 13 because the buildings of Realka and Kralja Petra Street 4 were in very bad condition. But even that accommodation was not satisfactory due to the distance from the city center, so at the beginning of 1935 it was decided to solve the issue of accommodation by building a building specially intended for that purpose.

Since the Belgrade Municipality gave a plot of land near the Church of St. Alexander Nevsky, a loan was taken, and on September 20, 1936, the foundation stone of the new high school building at Cara Dušana Street 61 was consecrated. The First Belgrade High School moved into that building on April 27, 1938. where it remains to this day.

== The school today ==
In 2009, the high school celebrated its 170th anniversary. The great jubilee of Serbian education, as part of a variety of activities (exhibitions, forums, the Night of the Museum event, concerts, sports competitions, international cooperation, the high school music festival in the Dom omladine), was crowned on June 6 with the Ceremonial Academy at the National Theatre.

The anniversary of 180 years of existence was celebrated during 2019 (Project Prva and friends, Velikani Prva tribune, Preliminary competition for students in Serbia, as part of the world competition in the knowledge of Chinese language and culture, Literary afternoon - hanging out with Milovan Vitezović, History and art lesson held in the ceremonial hall of the Rectorate of the University of Belgrade, the Ceremonial Academy In Glory of Enlightenment held on the Great Stage of the National Theater, School Day (June 18) in the ceremonial hall of the Gymnasium - traditional awarding of the best graduates and winners of national competitions).

The jubilee of 185 years of existence was celebrated in 2024.

Today, the First Belgrade High School has thirty-seven classes, 1,050 students divided into natural-mathematical, social-linguistic and classes for students with special abilities for computing and informatics, developed cabinet teaching and modern studies. The gymnasium is characterized by high-quality educational work and teaching staff, engaged pedagogical and psychological service and traditionally exceptional student potential.

== Notable alumni ==
- King Peter I
- Adam Bogosavljević, politician (23rd class, graduated 1863/64)
- Aleksandar Cincar-Marković, diplomat and more
- Aleksandar Belić, linguist, professor, president of the Serbian royal academy and САНУ
- Aleksandar Deroko, architect
- Antonije Bogićević, general, minister (13th class, graduated 1854/55)
- Aćim Čumić, law professor, minister (12th class, graduated 1853/54)
- Boris Tadić, former President of Serbia
- Borislav Lorenc, professor of the Pravoslavni bogoslovski fakultet
- Bogdan Popović, professor, academic
- Branislav Petronijević, philosopher
- Dragutin Dimitrijević Apis, military officer, member of the Black Hand organisation
- Čedomilj Mijatović, minister of finances and more (17th class, graduated 1858/59)
- Đorđe Simić, prime minister, minister, politician, diplomat, (16th class, graduated 1857/58)
- Gavrilo Princip, revolutionary
- Grgur Jakšić, historian, professor, academic
- Janko Šafarik, (25th class, graduated 1865/66)
- Jaša Prodanović, politician, minister
- Jevrem Gudović, minister (tenth class, graduated 1851/52)
- Jevrem Grujić, politician, minister, leader of the Liberal party (fourth class, graduated 1845/46)
- Jovan Avakumović, minister of justice (14th class, graduated 1855/56)
- Jovan Beli Marković, general, regent (first class, graduated 1842/43)
- Jovan Cvijić, founder of geographic sciences in Serbia
- Jovan Ristić, royal and knez regent, minister, historian (sixth class, graduated 1846/47)
- Jovan Skerlić, writer
- Kosta Vujić, later the professor of the First male gymnasium
- Ljubomir Kaljević, prime minister, minister (17th class, graduated 1858/59)
- Ljubomir Klerić, inventor, minister, academic (21st class, graduated 1862/63)
- Ljubomir Kovačević, historian, minister, academic (25th class, graduated 1866/67)
- Ljubomir Nenadović, man of letters (first class, graduated 1842/43)
- Ljubomir Stojanović, philologist
- Ljubomir Stojanović, historian, professor, minister (12th class, graduated 1853/54)
- Lazar Dokić, prime minister, doctor (20th class, graduated 1861/62)
- Marko Leko, chemist, professor, academic (28th class, graduated 1868/69)
- Milorad Mitrović, poet
- Mihailo Ristić, diplomat, consul
- Mihajlo Bogićević, minister (19th class, graduated 1860/61)
- Mihajlo Petrović Alas, mathematician and inventor
- Milan Kujundžić Aberdar, Philosophy professor, minister (17th class, graduated 1858/59)
- Milan Stojadinović, Prime Minister of Kingdom of Yugoslavia
- Milan Vukajlija
- Milutin Garašanin, colonel, prime minister, president of the parliament (17th class, graduated 1858/59)
- Milovan Janković, minister of finances, politician of the Liberal party (fourth class, graduated 1845/46)
- Momčilo Ninčić
- Miloš Milojević, (17th class, graduated 1858/59)
- Pavle Popović, professor, academic
- Petar Kočić, writer
- Rajko Lešjanin, minister (second class, graduated 1843/44)
- Raša Milošević, politician (28th class, graduated 1868/69)
- Sima Lozanić, chemist and university rector
- Slobodan Jovanović, Prime Minister of the Royal Yugoslav government-in-exile
- Vojvoda Stepa Stepanović, World War I Field Marshal
- Stojan Bošković, minister of justice (sixth class, graduated 1846/47)
- Stojan Novaković, scholar, Prime Minister of Kingdom of Serbia
- Stojan Ribarac, minister (29th class, graduated 1869/70)
- Stojan Veljković, minister of justice (sixth class, graduated 1846/47)
- Svetislav Vulović, minister (23rd class, graduated 1863/64)
- Svetozar Marković, politician, socialist (20th class, graduated 1861/62)
- Svetomir Nikolajević, professor of literature, minister, academic (21st class, graduated 1862/63)
- Toma Živanović, professor on the University of Belgrade Faculty of Law
- Uroš Knežević, painter, academic (19th class, graduated 1860/61)
- Vladan Đorđević, prime minister, surgeon (20th class, graduated 1861/62)
- Vladimir Karić, diplomat, consul (23rd class, graduated 1864/65)
- Vladimir Ljotić, diplomat, consul (25th class, graduated 1865/66)
- Velibor Vasović, footballer
- Veselin Čajkanović, classicist
- Vuk Jeremić, former president of United Nations General Assembly
- Vladimir Jovanović, professor, minister, part of the senate (eight class, graduated 1849/50)
- Vojvoda Živojin Mišić, World War I Field Marshal
- Vojislav Veljković, minister of finances
- Vojislav Marinkovič, prime minister, minister
