= Siniša Djaja =

Serbian chemist

Siniša Đaja (23 May 1887 – 10 November 1962) was a chemist, pharmacist and professor at the University of Belgrade, where he helped found the Faculty of Pharmacy. He was Director of the Institute of Pharmaceutical Technology from 1939-1957.

== Biography ==
He was born in Belgrade, Kingdom of Serbia to Jovan Đaja, a Roman Catholic politician, and Famija, a Jew from Sombor. In Belgrade he completed primary school, grammar school at the First Belgrade Gymnasium (in 1905), and went on to university from 1905 to 1910. During his studies, he worked in a pharmacy. After spending 1910-1911 in military service and qualifying as a reserve artillery officer, he received a state scholarship which he used to study at a pharmaceutical college in Graz. After an interruption by the Balkan Wars, he graduated in 1914. He returned to the military in August of that year. In late 1917, he was discharged from military service and transferred to the chemical and bacteriological laboratory in Lerin to test food and drinking water for the Serbian army.

After the end of the First World War, Đaja left Serbia to study bromatology, becoming a state chemist specializing in toxicology. He received his doctorate in 1920 for his thesis "Zinc in the human body". He then returned to Serbia, where he founded a toxicology department at the State Laboratory. From 1928-1929, he edited the magazine Apotekar. Also in 1929, he co-founded a pharmaceutical laboratory with a colleague, Dragomir Manojlović, which manufactured a number of drugs for vaginal and rectal applications. He later founded his own pharmacy in Belgrade, which he ran until 1949.

He was the president of the Serbian Pharmacy Society (1924—1932) and a member of the board of the Pharmacy Chamber of the Kingdom of Yugoslavia, as well as its section in Belgrade. In 1939, he was elected associate professor of the Galenic Pharmacy at the newly established Pharmaceutical Department of the Faculty of Medicine at the University of Belgrade. He spent World War II in captivity in Germany, returning to Serbia in 1945.

In 1947, he founded the Institute of Galenic Pharmacy, which he managed until his retirement. He advocated for the establishment of a Faculty of Pharmacy (separate from the Faculty of Medicine) at the University of Belgrade, where he continued to teach, becoming a full professor in 1949. He is the author of the textbook Galen Pharmacy (1952).

He retired in 1957 but continued to teach as a part-time professor.

== Legacy ==
A pharmacy in Zemun is named after him.
