= Llashticë =

Llashticë: Llashtica or Llashticë (Albanian) Влаштица / Vlaštica (Serbian)
- Village
- Location in Kosovo
- Coordinates: 42°23′9″N 21°30′15″E
- Location: Kosovo
- District: Gjilan
- Municipality: Gjilan

Population (2024)
  - Total: 1,175
- Time zone: UTC+1 (CET)

Llashticë (Albanian: Llashticë) or Vlaštica (Serbian Cyrillic: Влаштица), is a village in the municipality of Gjilan in Kosovo. It is situated at the foot of the Karadak mountains.

== History ==
During the Ottoman period in Kosovo, Llashticë was part of the Karadak Nahiya within the Kaza of Gjilan. During the Kosovo War, Yugoslav forces carried out a military operation in the villages of Karadak, including Llashticë, Zhegër, Llovca, and Lladova. In Llashticë, they massacred 26 Albanian civilians.

== Demographics ==
As of 2011, Llashticë had a population of 1,624 people, of whom 1,618 were Albanians, 5 identified as Bosniaks, and 1 person identified as a Balkan Egyptian.

== Sights ==
- Illyrian Late Iron Age burial mounds
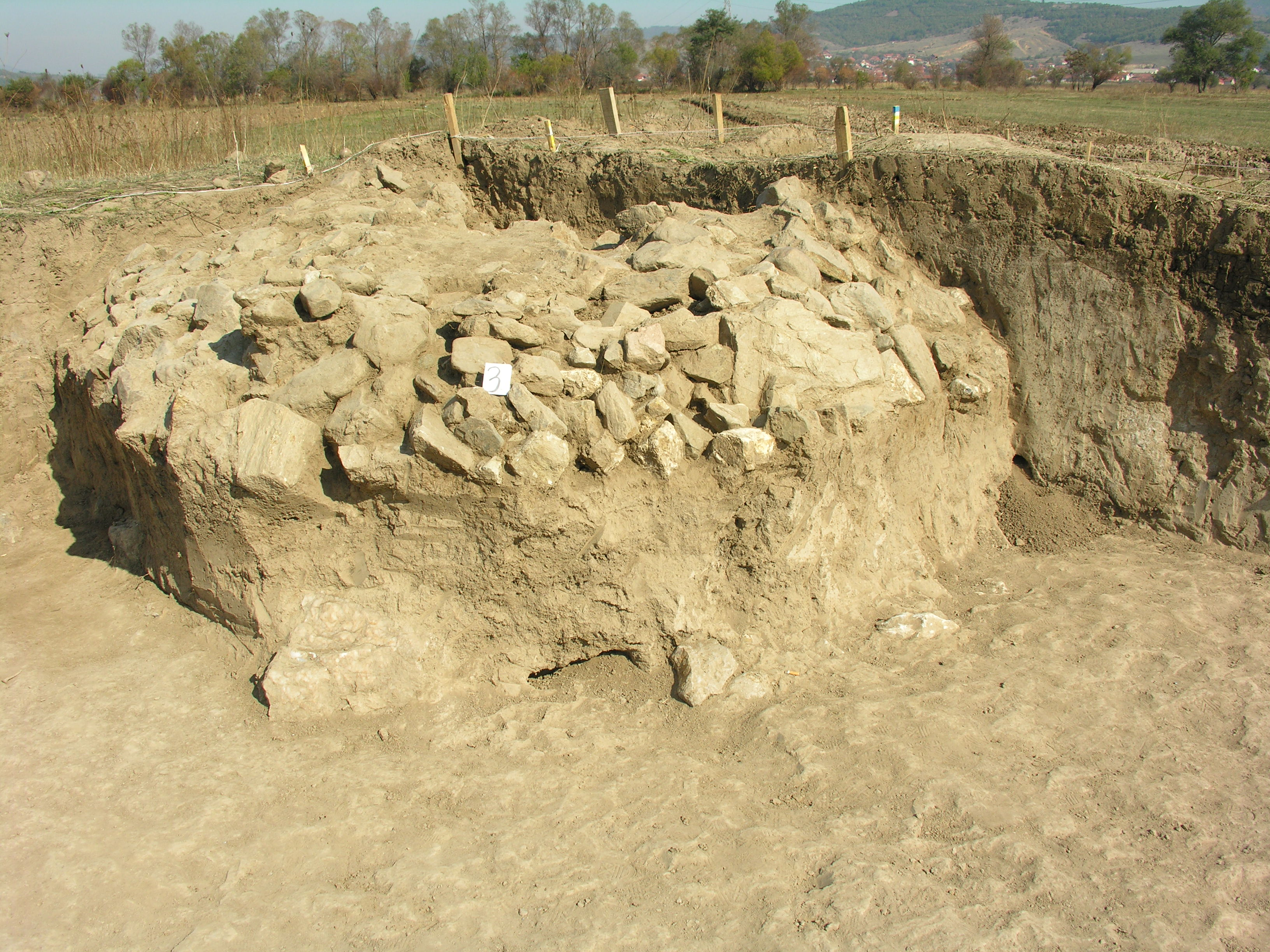
  The Illyrian Llashtica burial mounds necropolis

== Notable people ==
- Halit Ibrahim Popofci, Albanian rebel who killed Grigoriy Shcherbina
