= Honorary Consulate of Serbia, Bitola =

Serbian consulate in Bitola
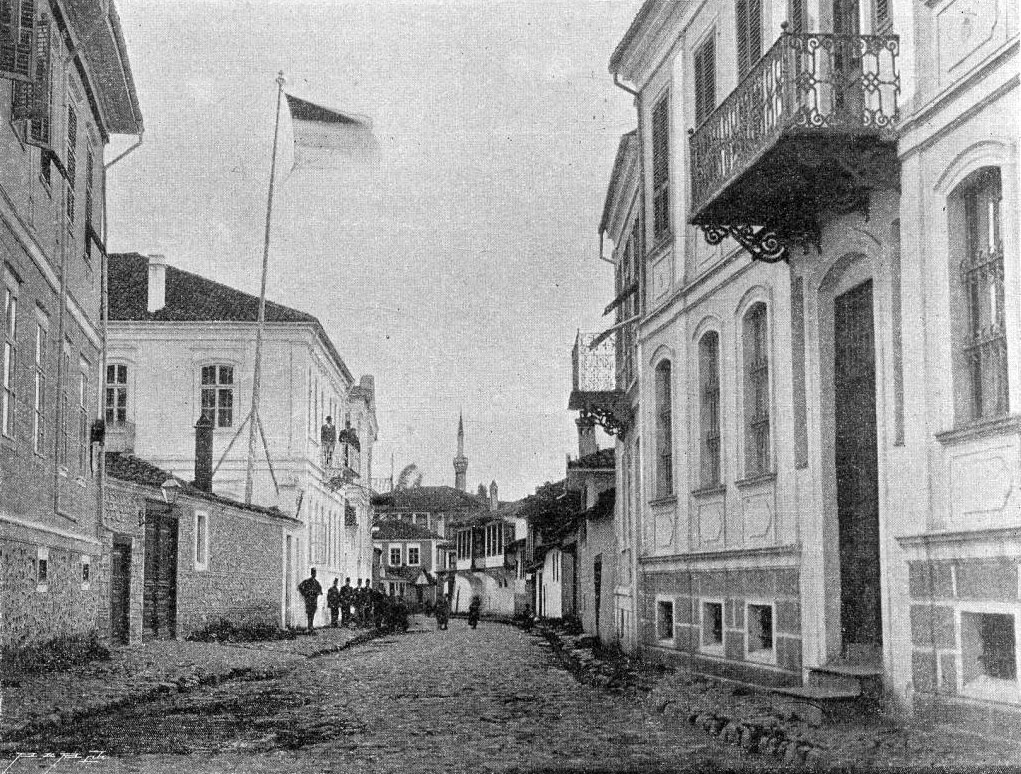
- Formation: April 1889; 4 December 2007
- Type: Diplomatic office
- Purpose: Protection of Ottoman Serbs (old consulate)
- Location: Bitola, Ottoman Empire (old consulate)/North Macedonia (new consulate)
- Key people: see list

The Serbian consulate in Bitola (Serbian Cyrillic: Српски конзулат у Битољу) was established in 1889 after diplomatic conferences between the Kingdom of Serbia and the Ottoman Empire. Serbian consulates opened in the seats of the vilayets of Kosovo (Pristina), Manastir (Bitola) and Salonica (Thessaloniki). The Bitola council officially opened on May 9, 1889 with the mission to protect the interests of Serbs in the area, working on opening Serbian schools, etc.

A new Serbian consulate was inaugurated in Bitola on 4 December 2007.

== Background ==
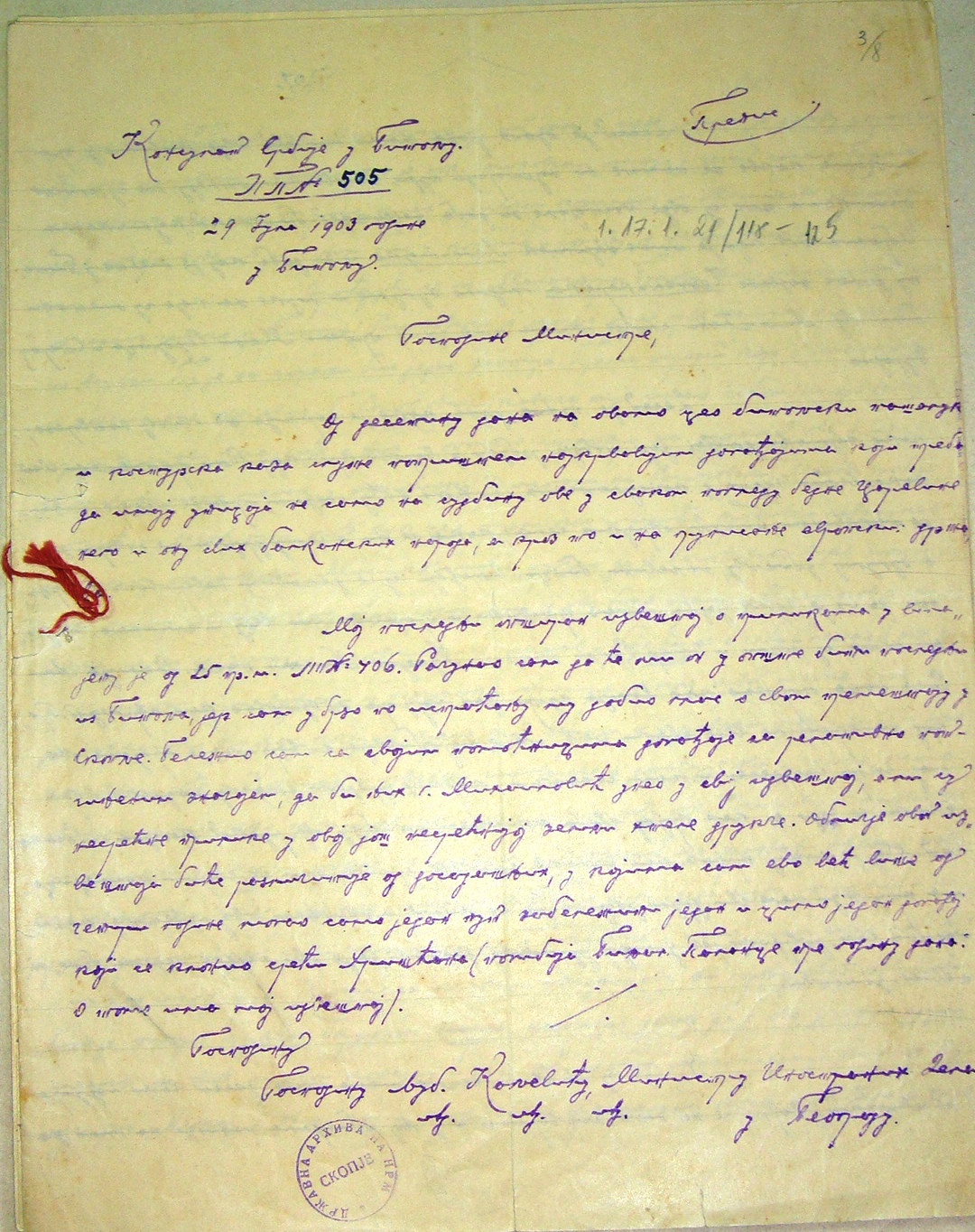
Mihailo Ristic's Report, Consul in Bitola, to Ljuba Koljevic, Minister of Foreign Affairs, about the events in the vilayet of the day of the uprising. (Bitola, July 29, 1903)

Serbian national work in Old Serbia and Macedonia reached better results at the end of the 1860s and beginning of 1870s, increasing after the Great Eastern Crisis with the Austro-Hungarian occupation of Bosnia and Herzegovina and troop deployment in the Sanjak of Novi Pazar. The Society of St. Sava (est. 1886) and an educational department (est. March 1887) would handle the greater part of educational-cultural work, while Stojan Novaković, the Serbian Minister in Constantinople (1886–91), led the educational-cultural work, in effect, through the consulates of Skopje (1887), Thessaloniki (1887), Pristina (1889) and Bitola (1889). The main tasks of the consulates were to open schools, establish church-educational municipalities, Serbian bookshops and spreading Serbian literature, and educating Macedonians. Novaković prepared the opening of schools and church-educational municipalities within the Ecumenical Patriarchate in spring 1887. It was stressed that the Greek metropolitans were to help the Serbian consulates and overall Serbian activity in the Ottoman Empire.

The establishment of the Bulgarian Exarchate in 1870 had led to a schism in the Patriarchate and a boost to Bulgarian national aspirations in the Balkans. The return of Bulgarian bishops to the eparchies of Skopje, Ohrid and Veles at the end of the 1880s alarmed the Serbian and Greek diplomacy. Bulgarian politicians had a goal of implementing the borders drafted in the Treaty of San Stefano (1878). Novaković met with Ottoman representatives to whom he opposed placing the Bulgarian bishops, however, two Bulgarian bishops arrived at Ohrid and Skopje in 1890, which nevertheless prompted pursuing Serbian national interests in Macedonia. When asked by an Austro-Hungarian minister on the "ethnographic situation" he described the Macedonians as a transitional link between Serbs and Bulgarians, similar to Little Russia and Provence. Novaković started negotiations over the determination of spheres of interest in Macedonia with the arrival of Greek minister Nikolaos Mavrocordatos in Constantinople (1889).

== Consuls ==
- Dimitrije Bodi (1889–1895)
- Milivoje Vasiljević (1895–1896)
- Milojko Veselinović (1897–1899)
- Mihailo Ristić (1899–1903)
- Svetislav Stanojević (1903–1907)
- Živojin Balugdžić (1907)
- Ljubomir Mihailović (1907–1912)

== See also ==
- Serb Democratic League

== Sources ==
- Terzić, Slavenko (2008). "Конзулат Краљевине Србије у Битољу (1889-1897)" (PDF). Историјски часопис (57): 327–342.
- Биљана Вучетић (1 September 2012). Наша ствар у Османском царству: Our Issue in the Ottoman Empire. Istorijski institut. pp. 167–. ISBN 978-86-7743-095-5.
