= Dimitrije Ljotić =

Serbian fascist politician

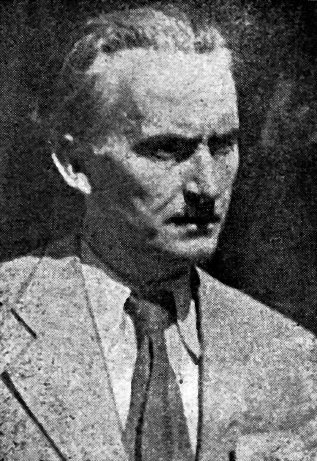

Minister of Justice of Yugoslavia
- In office 16 February 1931 – 17 August 1931
- Monarch: Alexander I
- Prime Minister: Petar Živković
- Preceded by: Milan Srškić
- Succeeded by: Dragutin S. Kojić

Personal details
- Born: 12 August 1891 Belgrade, Kingdom of Serbia
- Died: 23 April 1945 (aged 53) Ajdovščina, Democratic Federal Yugoslavia
- Party: Yugoslav National Movement (Zbor)
- Other political affiliations: People's Radical Party (1920–27)
- Spouse: Ivka Mavrinac (1920–45; his death)
- Relations: Milan Nedić (cousin); Milutin Nedić (cousin)
- Children: 3
- Parent(s): Vladimir Ljotić; Ljubica Stanojević
- Education: University of Belgrade
- Profession: Lawyer

Military service
- Allegiance: Kingdom of Serbia; Kingdom of Yugoslavia; Government of National Salvation
- Branch/service: Army
- Years of service: 1912–13; 1914–20
- Rank: Corporal
- Battles/wars: Balkan Wars; World War I

Dimitrije Ljotić (Serbian Cyrillic: Димитрије Љотић; 12 August 1891 – 23 April 1945) was a Serbian and Yugoslav clerical-fascist politician and ideologue who established the Yugoslav National Movement (Zbor) in 1935 and collaborated with Nazi authorities in German-occupied Serbia during World War II.

He joined the Serbian Army with the outbreak of the Balkan Wars, fought on the Serbian side during World War I and remained in active service until 1920, when he decided to pursue a career in politics. He joined the People's Radical Party that year and became regional deputy for the Smederevo District in 1930. In 1931, he was appointed to the position of Yugoslav Minister of Justice by King Alexander I but resigned following a disagreement between him and the king over the layout of the Yugoslav political system. Ljotić founded Zbor in 1935. The party received little support from the largely anti-German Serbian public and never won more than 1 percent of the vote in the 1935 and 1938 Yugoslav parliamentary elections. Ljotić was arrested in the run-up to the latter elections and briefly sent to an insane asylum after the authorities accused him of having a "religious mania". He voiced his opposition to the Cvetković–Maček Agreement in 1939 and his supporters reacted to it violently. Zbor was soon outlawed by the Yugoslav government, forcing Ljotić into hiding. He remained in hiding until April 1941, when the Axis powers invaded Yugoslavia. Ljotić was later invited by the Germans to join the Serbian puppet government of Milan Aćimović and was offered the position of economic commissioner. He never took office, partly because he disliked the idea of playing a secondary role in the administration and partly because of his unpopularity. He resorted to indirectly exerting his influence over the Serbian puppet government through two of his closest associates whom the Germans had selected as commissioners. In September 1941, the Germans gave Ljotić permission to form the Serbian Volunteer Detachments, which were later renamed the Serbian Volunteer Corps (SDK).

Ljotić was publicly denounced as a traitor by the Yugoslav government-in-exile and Chetnik leader Draža Mihailović in July 1942. He and other Serbian collaborationist officials left Belgrade in October 1944 and made their way to Slovenia, from where they intended to launch an assault against the Independent State of Croatia (NDH). Between March and April, Ljotić and Mihailović agreed to a last-ditch alliance against the Communist-led Yugoslav Partisans and their forces came together under the command of Chetnik General Miodrag Damjanović on 27 March.

Ljotić was killed in an automobile accident on 23 April and was buried in Šempeter pri Gorici. His funeral service was jointly conducted by Bishop Nikolaj Velimirović and Serbian Orthodox Patriarch Gavrilo Dožić, whose release from the Dachau concentration camp Ljotić had secured the previous December. In early May, Damjanović led the SDK–Chetnik formations under his command into northwestern Italy, where they surrendered to the British and were placed in detainment camps. Many were later extradited to Yugoslavia, where several thousand were executed by the Partisans and buried in mass graves in the Kočevski Rog plateau. Others immigrated to the west, where they established émigré organizations intended to promote Zbor's political agenda. The antagonism between these groups and those affiliated with the Chetniks continued in exile.

== Early life ==
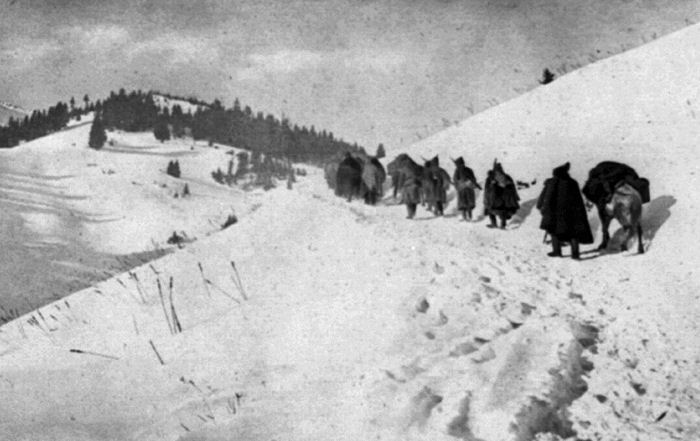
A column of Serbian soldiers retreating through the Albanian mountains, c. 1915. Ljotić was involved in the Serbian Army's retreat through the country during World War I.

Dimitrije Ljotić was born in Belgrade on 12 August 1891 to Vladimir Ljotić and his wife Ljubica (née Stanojević). His father was a prominent politician in the port town of Smederevo and served as the Serbian government consul to Greece.

The Ljotić family was descended from two brothers, Đorđe and Tomislav Dimitrijević, who hailed from the village of Blace, in Greek Macedonia. The origin of the surname Ljotić rests with Đorđe, who often went by the nickname "Ljota". The two brothers settled in the village of Krnjevo in or around 1750 and relocated to Smederevo in the latter half of the 18th century. The Ljotićs were closely connected with the Karađorđević dynasty, which had ruled Serbia several times throughout the 19th century.

In 1858, the rival Obrenović dynasty seized power in the country and forced Prince Alexander Karađorđević into exile. Ljotić's father was forced out of the country in 1868 after being implicated in a conspiracy against the Obrenović dynasty and its head, Prince Milan. He did not return to Serbia until Milan's abdication on 6 March 1889. Apart from being a close friend of Serbia's future king, Peter I, Ljotić's father was also the first person to translate The Communist Manifesto into Serbian. Ljotić's maternal great-grandfather, knez Stanoje, was an outlaw who was killed in the Slaughter of the Knezes in January 1804.

Ljotić finished primary school in Smederevo. He attended gymnasium in Salonika, where his family had relocated in 1907. Ljotić was religiously devoted in his youth and even contemplated a career in the Serbian Orthodox Church. He was greatly influenced by Leo Tolstoy's doctrine of Christian non-violence, but later rejected this doctrine during World War I. Following his father's advice, he went on to study law and graduated from the Law School of the University of Belgrade. With the outbreak of the Balkan Wars, Ljotić joined the Serbian Army.

In the autumn of 1913, he accepted a state scholarship to study in Paris. He stayed in the city for nearly a year, and while studying at the Institute of Agriculture he was exposed to the right-wing, proto-fascist ideas of writer Charles Maurras. Maurras was a French counter-revolutionary who founded the far-right political movement known as Action Française and whose writings went on to influence European fascists and the ideologues of the Vichy Regime during World War II. Ljotić described Maurras as a "rare shining spirit" and cited him as one of his greatest intellectual influences.

Ljotić returned from Paris on 1 September 1914, and rejoined the Serbian Army. He attained the rank of corporal by year's end and was wounded during the Ovče Pole Offensive. During the winter of 1915–16, he participated in the Serbian Army's retreat through Albania. Ljotić remained on active service after the war ended, with a unit guarding the border between the newly formed Kingdom of Serbs, Croats and Slovenes and the Kingdom of Italy near the town of Bakar. During this time, he also worked for the intelligence service of the Kingdom of Serbs, Croats and Slovenes. In 1919, he helped break a railway strike meant to disrupt the flow of munitions intended for anti-Communist forces fighting against Béla Kun in Hungary. In 1920, he ordered troops under his command to arrest striking railway workers, convinced that all were complicit in a Communist conspiracy. Ljotić was demobilized on 17 June 1920. He subsequently married Ivka Mavrinac, a Roman Catholic Croat from the village of Krasica on the Croatian Littoral. The couple had two sons, Vladimir and Nikola, and a daughter, Ljubica. Ljotić and his wife relocated to Belgrade not long after their marriage. Ljotić passed his bar examination on 22 September 1921, and began practicing law. He later became vice-president of the diocesan council of the Serbian Orthodox Church in the town of Požarevac, and represented the Požarevac diocese in the church's patriarchal council.

== Interwar political career ==
=== People's Radical Party and Ministry of Justice ===
Ljotić joined the People's Radical Party (Serbo-Croatian: Narodna radikalna stranka, NRS) of Nikola Pašić in 1920, stating that it was "God's will". He ran for public office in the 1927 parliamentary elections, and received 5,614 votes. This accounted for 19.7 percent of votes cast in the Smederevo District and was not enough to see him win the seat in parliament, and it was won by Democratic Party politician Kosta Timotijević. Ljotić left the NRS shortly after these elections.

On 20 June 1928, Montenegrin politician Puniša Račić assassinated Croatian Peasant Party (Serbo-Croatian: Hrvatska seljačka stranka, HSS) representatives Pavle Radić and Đuro Basariček and mortally wounded HSS leader Stjepan Radić in a shooting which took place on the floor of the parliament of the Kingdom of Serbs, Croats and Slovenes. The shooting led to King Alexander suspending the Vidovdan Constitution on 6 January 1929 and proclaiming a royal dictatorship. The country was renamed Yugoslavia and divided into 9 banovinas (or provinces), all of which were named after the country's major rivers. The pre-1912 territory of the former Kingdom of Serbia was divided mostly between the banovinas of Danube and Morava, and to a lesser extent, of the banovinas of Drina and Zeta.

In 1929, Ljotić was granted the first of several audiences with Alexander. He became regional deputy for the Smederevo District in 1930. On 16 February 1931, he was appointed to the position of Yugoslav Minister of Justice in King Alexander's royal dictatorship as a result of his unwavering loyalty to the Karađorđević dynasty. In June of that year, Ljotić suggested to Alexander that the Yugoslav political system be structured on the Italian fascist model. He presented him with a draft constitution that proposed "an organic constitutional hereditary monarchy, undemocratic and non-parliamentary, based on the mobilization of popular forces, gathered around economic, professional, cultural and charity organizations, that would be politically accountable to the king." The king rejected Ljotić's constitution as being too authoritarian. On 17 August, Ljotić resigned from his post after the government decided to create a single government-backed political party in Yugoslavia.

=== Zbor ===
In 1934, Alexander was assassinated in Marseille by a Bulgarian mercenary working for the Ustaše. That year, Ljotić made contact with three pro-fascist movements and the publishers of their respective newspapers—Otadžbina (Fatherland), published in Belgrade; the monthly Zbor (Rally), published in Herzegovina; and the weekly Buđenje (Awakening), published in Petrovgrad (modern Zrenjanin). Ljotić contributed to all three publications and became most influential with the Otadžbina movement. He subsequently founded the Yugoslav National Movement (Serbo-Croatian: Jugoslovenski narodni pokret), which was also known as the United Active Labour Organization (Združena borbena organizacija rada, or Zbor).

Zbor was created by the merger of three fascist movements—Yugoslav Action from Zagreb, the "Fighters" from Ljubljana, and Buđenje from Petrovgrad. It was officially established in Belgrade on 6 January 1935, the sixth anniversary of King Alexander's dictatorship proclamation. Its members elected Ljotić its president, the Croat Juraj Korenić its vice-president, the Slovene Fran Kandare as second vice-president and the Serb Velibor Jonić as its secretary-general. Zbor's official stated goal was the imposition of a planned economy and "the racial and biological defense of the national life-force and the family". Otadžbina became its official newspaper.

Zbor was declared illegal upon establishment, since virtually all political parties in Yugoslavia had been banned since the declaration of King Alexander's dictatorship in 1929. On 2 September 1935, Jonić and attorney Milan Aćimović petitioned the Yugoslav Ministry of the Interior to legalize Zbor. On 8 November, the Ministry of the Interior conceded and recognized Zbor as an official political party. German officials in Yugoslavia quickly took notice of the movement, with the German envoy to Yugoslavia, Viktor von Heeren, providing it with financial assistance and infiltrating it with German agents. A German observer noted: "The movement Zbor represents a kind of national socialist party. Its principles are the struggle against Freemasons, against Jews, against Communists and against western capitalism." German industrial firms provided Zbor with further financial aid, as did German intelligence services.

Since 1935, Ljotić was a member of the Braničevo Diocese Council whose vice-president was a member of the Patriarchal Council of the Serbian Orthodox Church in Belgrade. Through these connections, Ljotić developed strong relations with bishop Nikolaj Velimirović, under whose influence some members of his clerical organization Bogomoljci became part of the Zbor movement.

Most of the support that Zbor received in Serbia came from members of the urban middle class, as well as right-wing students and members of the armed forces. The majority of Zbor's members were ethnic Serbs, though some Croats and Slovenes also joined. Its membership fluctuated often, primarily due to disagreements over Ljotić's authoritarianism and his lack of popularity and political power in Serbia. Ljotić was an unpopular figure in Serbia due to his pro-German sympathies and religious fanaticism. The limited amount of support received by Zbor itself stemmed from the fact that radical right-wing sentiment was not strong amongst the Serbian population. The reason for this was that right-wing politics were associated with Germany. Being extremely anti-German, the majority of ethnic Serbs rejected fascist and Nazi ideas outright. Zbor never had more than 10,000 active members at any given time, with most of its support coming from Smederevo and from the ethnic German (Volksdeutsche) minority in Vojvodina that had been exposed to Nazi propaganda since 1933.

During Milan Stojadinović's premiership, many members of Zbor left the party and joined Stojadinović's Yugoslav Radical Union (Serbo-Croatian: Jugoslovenska radikalna zajednica, JRZ). Nevertheless, the movement continued to advocate the abandonment of individualism and parliamentary democracy. Ljotić called for Yugoslavia to unite around a single ruler and return to its religious and cultural traditions, embracing the teachings of Christianity, traditional values and corporatism. He advocated a centrally organized state, stating that the unification of South Slavs was a historical and political inevitability and that Serbs, Croats and Slovenes shared "blood kinship and feeling of common fate." At the same time, the Yugoslavia that Ljotić envisioned was one that was to be dominated by Serbia. Zbor openly promoted antisemitism, being the only party in Yugoslavia to openly do so, as well as xenophobia.

=== Elections ===
Despite its opposition to parliamentary democracy, Zbor participated in the 1935 Yugoslav parliamentary elections. It offered 8,100 candidates throughout Yugoslavia. On 5 May the Yugoslav government first announced the results of the elections, which showed that 72.6 percent of the eligible electorate had cast a total of 2,778,172 ballots. The party of Bogoljub Jevtić had received 1,738,390 (62.6%) votes and 320 seats in parliament and the Opposition Bloc led by Vladko Maček had received 983,248 (35.4%) votes and 48 seats. Zbor finished last in the polls, with 23,814 (0.8%) votes, and had acquired no seats in parliament. Of all the votes it had received, 13,635 came from the Danube Banovina, in which Ljotić's home district of Smederevo was located. The election results initially published by authorities caused an upheaval amongst the public, forcing the government to publish the results of a recount on 22 May. The recount showed that 100,000 additional ballots that had not been recorded on 5 May had been cast and that Jevtić's party had received 1,746,982 (60.6%) votes and 303 seats, the Opposition Bloc had received 1,076,345 (37.4%) and 67 seats, and that Zbor had received 24,008 (0.8%) votes and again no seats.

In 1937, Ljotić began attacking Stojadinović through Zbor publications and accused him of complicity in King Alexander's assassination three years earlier. Stojadinović's government responded by exposing Ljotić as having been funded by the Germans and provided with financial resources by them to spread Nazi propaganda and promote German economic interests in Serbia. The incriminating material linking Ljotić with the Germans was given to Yugoslav authorities by German Luftwaffe commander Hermann Göring, a supporter of Stojadinović. Stojadinović used these revelations to his benefit in the following year's parliamentary elections, presenting his opponents, including Ljotić, as "disloyal agitators". Ljotić responded by attacking Stojadinović through issues of Otadžbina, many of which were subsequently banned. The Stojadinović government went on to prohibit all Zbor rallies and newspapers, confiscated Zbor propaganda material, and arrested Zbor leaders. In September 1938, Ljotić was arrested after the Yugoslav gendarmerie opened fire on a crowd of Zbor supporters, killing at least one person. A frequent churchgoer, he was charged with religious mania and briefly sent to an insane asylum before being released.

On 10 October, Stojadinović dissolved the Parliament of Yugoslavia, proclaimed new elections and arranged further arrests of Zbor members. Ljotić responded by publicly stating that Zbor supporters were being arrested in order to prevent them from participating in the forthcoming elections. The parliamentary elections of December 1938 offered three candidates—Stojadinović, Maček, and Ljotić. During voting itself, members of opposition parties, including Zbor, were arrested and subjected to police intimidation and voting registers were allegedly falsified in Stojadinović's favour. Zbor finished last in the elections, receiving 30,734 (1.01%) votes, and again winning no seats in parliament. 17,573 of the votes in favour of Zbor were cast in the Danube Banovina, while the number of votes in the Dalmatian Littoral Banovina increased from 974 in May 1935 to 2,427 in December 1938.

=== Anti-Jewish propaganda ===
Among Ljotić's anti-Jewish propaganda activity was a brochure from 1938 entitled Drama savremenog čovečanstva (Drama of Modern Humanity), where he wrote that "Judaism is the greatest evil of the present. It is the most insidious and most dangerous opponent for all Christian nations. Judaism must therefore be liquidated quickly and vigorously, because otherwise the collapse of Christian civilization and the Christian world is inevitable".

== World War II ==
=== Activities in Yugoslavia ===
In August 1939, Ljotić's cousin, Milan Nedić, was appointed Yugoslav Minister of Defense. Later that year, almost all Zbor publications, including Otadžbina, Buđenje, Zbor, Naš put (Our Path) and Vihor (Whirlwind), were prohibited. Ljotić exploited the connections he had with Nedić to ensure that the banned Zbor-published journal Bilten (Bulletin) was distributed to members of the Royal Yugoslav Army. The journal was published illegally in a military printing house and distributed throughout the country by military couriers. Ljotić was the journal's main contributor and editor-in-chief. Fifty-eight issues of Bilten were published from March 1939 until October 1940, in which Ljotić advocated a pro-Axis Yugoslav foreign policy and criticized Belgrade's tolerance of Jews. As many as 20,000 copies each were printed of later issues of the journal. Ljotić was particularly pleased with being able to exert his ideological influence over young military academy trainees as well as older officers.

With the outbreak of World War II, Ljotić supported Yugoslavia's policy of neutrality in the conflict while promoting the position that Yugoslav diplomacy should focus on relations with Berlin. He vehemently opposed the August 1939 Cvetković–Maček Agreement and repeatedly wrote letters to Prince Paul urging him to annul it. In these letters, he advocated an immediate re-organization of the government according to Zbor ideology, the abolishment of Croatian autonomy, the division of the Royal Yugoslav Army into contingents of mostly ethnic Serbs, with some Croat and Slovene volunteers, who would be armed, and contingents of most Croats and Slovenes in the armed forces, who would serve as labour units and would be unarmed. Effectively, the purpose of all these points was to reduce non-Serbs in Yugoslavia to the status of second-class citizens. By this point, Zbor was infiltrated by the German Gestapo, the Abwehr (German military intelligence), and the Schutzstaffel (SS). In 1940, the Royal Yugoslav Army purged its pro-German elements and Ljotić lost much of the influence he held over the armed forces.

Ljotić's followers responded to the Cvetković–Maček Agreement with violence, clashing with the youth wing of the Communist Party of Yugoslavia (KPJ). These incidents attracted as many as 5,000 new members to Zbor and led to the formation of a Zbor student wing known as the White Eagles (Serbo-Croatian: Beli orlovi). In July 1940, Ljotić expressed his bitter opposition to the diplomatic recognition of the Soviet Union by Belgrade, which was meant to strengthen Yugoslavia internally in the case of war.

On 23 October 1940, White Eagles members massed outside the campus of the University of Belgrade. University president Petar Micić was a Zbor sympathizer. The Belgrade police, who were alleged to have had foreknowledge of the riots, withdrew from the area before violence erupted. The White Eagles members then threatened faculty and students with pistols and knives, stabbed some of them, hailed Adolf Hitler and Benito Mussolini as their heroes and shouted "down with the Jews!" Members of Slovenski Jug (Slavic South), a Serbian nationalist movement, participated in the riots, which were orchestrated by Ljotić to provoke martial law and bring about a more centralized system of control in the university. The Serbian public responded to the riots with outrage. On 24 October, the Yugoslav government revoked Zbor's legal status. On 2 November, the Ministry of Interior sent a list of Zbor members to all municipal administrators in Serbia. The government cracked down on Zbor by detaining several hundred members, forcing Ljotić into hiding. One of the only public figures in Serbia to speak in favour of Ljotić during this period was Serbian Orthodox Bishop Nikolaj Velimirović, who praised his "faith in God" and "good character".

Although a government investigation found Zbor guilty of high treason for accepting German funds, the authorities were careful not to arrest Ljotić in order to not provoke the Germans. Ljotić was placed under government surveillance but authorities quickly lost track of him. He hid with friends in Belgrade and remained in contact with Nedić and Velimirović. On 6 November, Nedić resigned from his post to protest the government crackdown on Zbor. Additional issues of Bilten continued to be printed despite his resignation. These supported a pro-Axis Yugoslav foreign policy, criticized the government's tolerance of Jews and Freemasons and attacked pro-British members of the government for their opposition to Yugoslavia signing the Tripartite Pact. Ljotić remained in hiding until April 1941.

=== Occupation of Yugoslavia ===
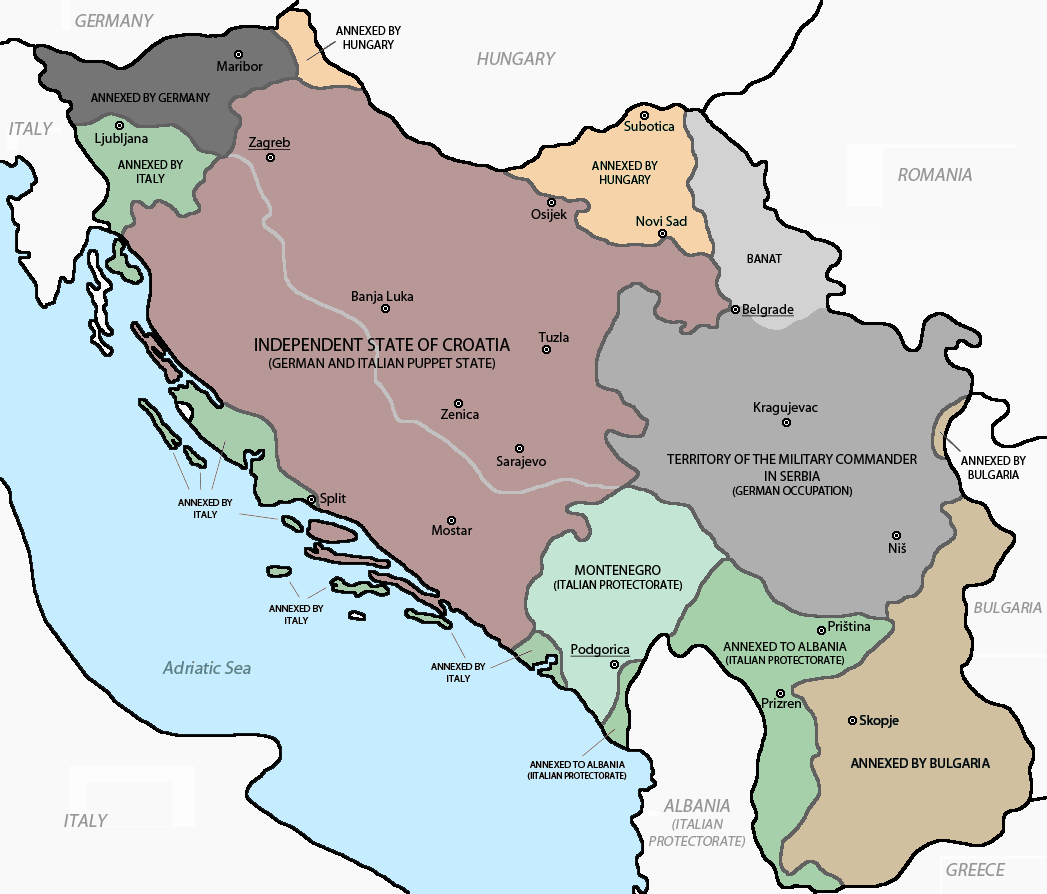
A map showing the Axis occupation of Yugoslavia from 1941 to 1943.

With the Axis invasion of Yugoslavia, several dozen Royal Yugoslav Army officers affiliated with Zbor were captured by the Wehrmacht but were quickly released. The Germans sent Ljotić a written notice assuring his freedom of movement in German-occupied Serbia. Not long after German forces entered Belgrade, Ljotić's followers were given the task of selecting an estimated 1,200 Jews from the city's non-Jewish population.

When they first occupied the country, the Germans prohibited the activity of all Serbian political parties except Zbor. Although they originally intended to make Ljotić the head of a Serbian puppet government, both Ljotić and the Germans realized that his unpopularity would make any government led by him a failure. The Germans believed that Ljotić had a "dubious reputation among Serbs". Ljotić told Gestapo officer Karl Wilhelm Krause that "[an] uncompromised man with generally recognized authority and force of personality ... [is] needed to convince the people that the Germans are their friends, that they want the best for the people and that they are the saviours of humankind from Communism." The Germans soon invited Ljotić to join the initial Serbian puppet government, the Commissioner Administration of Milan Aćimović. Ljotić was offered the position of economic commissioner but never took office, partly because he disliked the idea of playing a secondary role in the administration and partly because of his unpopularity. He resorted to indirectly exerting his influence over the Serbian puppet government through two of his closest associates, Stevan Ivanić and Miloslav Vasiljević, whom the Germans had selected as commissioners. The only official function Ljotić held in German-occupied Serbia was administrator of Smederevo. He helped in the town's reconstruction after large parts of it were destroyed in an ammunition depot explosion in June 1941.

In July and August, the Germans gave Ljotić permission to broadcast three of his speeches over Radio Belgrade and consulted him prior to appointing Nedić as leader of the Government of National Salvation in the Territory of the Military Commander in Serbia. In one of his July speeches, Ljotić proclaimed that the ultimate aim of the Soviet Union was "the destruction of the national and Christian order, which would be followed by the rule of Jews over all nations."

==== Formation of the Serbian Volunteer Detachments ====
In response to the Communist uprising that had erupted in the aftermath of the German occupation of Serbia, hundreds of prominent and influential Serbs signed an "Appeal to the Serbian Nation" which was published in major Belgrade newspapers on 11 August. The appeal called upon the Serbian population to help the authorities in every way in their struggle against the Communist rebels, and called for loyalty to the Nazis and condemned the Partisan resistance as unpatriotic. Ljotić was one of 546 signatories.

The Germans trusted Ljotić more than any other ethnic Serb in occupied Yugoslavia. In need of a reliable collaborationist force to combat the Communists, they gave him permission to form the Serbian Volunteer Detachments (Serbo-Croatian: Srpski dobrovoljački odredi, SDO) in September 1941. The SDO initially launched public appeals calling for volunteers "in the struggle against the Communist danger" and eventually grew to consist of 3,500 armed men. These appeals failed to mention guerrilla leader Draža Mihailović or his Chetniks. By November, Ljotić was openly denouncing Mihailović. In one newspaper article, he accused him of being responsible for the deaths of many Serbs and for causing widespread destruction as a result of his "naïve" cooperation with the Communists.

In direct response to the Communist uprising, the Germans decreed that 100 Serbian civilians would be executed for every German soldier killed and 50 would be executed for every German soldier wounded. This policy culminated in the Kragujevac massacre of October 1941, in which a division of Ljotić's volunteers was involved. Earlier that month, the Chetniks and Partisans had ambushed a column of German soldiers near Gornji Milanovac, killing 10 and wounding 26. The Germans turned to Kragujevac for retaliation, not because of anti-German activity in the town but because not enough adult males could be found otherwise to meet the required quota for executions.

According to eyewitnesses, SDO commander Marisav Petrović and his men entered barracks in which hostages were being held and, with German approval, freed those whom they recognized as supporters of Ljotić and Nedić, as well as those whose political attitudes they considered to be "nationally correct". Petrović accused those whom he had failed to free of supporting the Communists and spreading Communist propaganda, thus "infecting" Serbian society with their leftist ideas. Most of those who remained in German hands and were subsequently executed were high school students. According to the post-war testimony of Kosta Mušicki, another high-ranking SDO commander, Petrović also ordered the arrests of countless Romani civilians from surrounding villages and handed them over to the Germans for execution. More than 3,000 citizens of Kragujevac were killed during the massacre.

==== Serbian Volunteer Corps and propaganda efforts ====
On 22 October, the Grand Anti-Masonic Exhibition opened in Belgrade, organized by Zbor with German financial support. The exhibition sought to expose an alleged Judeo-Masonic/Communist conspiracy for world domination through several displays featuring anti-Semitic propaganda. Serbian collaborationist newspapers such as Obnova (Renewal) and Naša Borba (Our Struggle) wrote positively of the exhibit, declaring Jews to be "the ancient enemies of the Serbian people" and that "Serbs should not wait for the Germans to begin the extermination of the Jews." The latter newspaper, Naša Borba, had been established by Ljotić earlier in the year and its title echoed that of Hitler's Mein Kampf (My Struggle). Most of its contributors were well educated and included university students, teachers, lawyers and engineers. Ljotić and his associates were responsible for the printing of fifty antisemitic titles between 1941 and 1944. He also founded the Radna Služba (Labour Service), a youth movement similar to the Hitler Youth.

In November, Ljotić intervened on behalf of 300–500 men detained by the Germans as suspected Freemasons. He persuaded German military administration chief Harald Turner that the captured men were not Freemasons and told him that they were not to be shot as hostages. According to his personal secretary, Ljotić also asked Turner to not order the killing of Jews, stating "[I am] against Jews ruling my country's economy, but I am against their murder." He added that "their innocently-spilled blood cannot bring any good to the people who do this." Turner was reportedly surprised by Ljotić's statements, given his history of antisemitism.

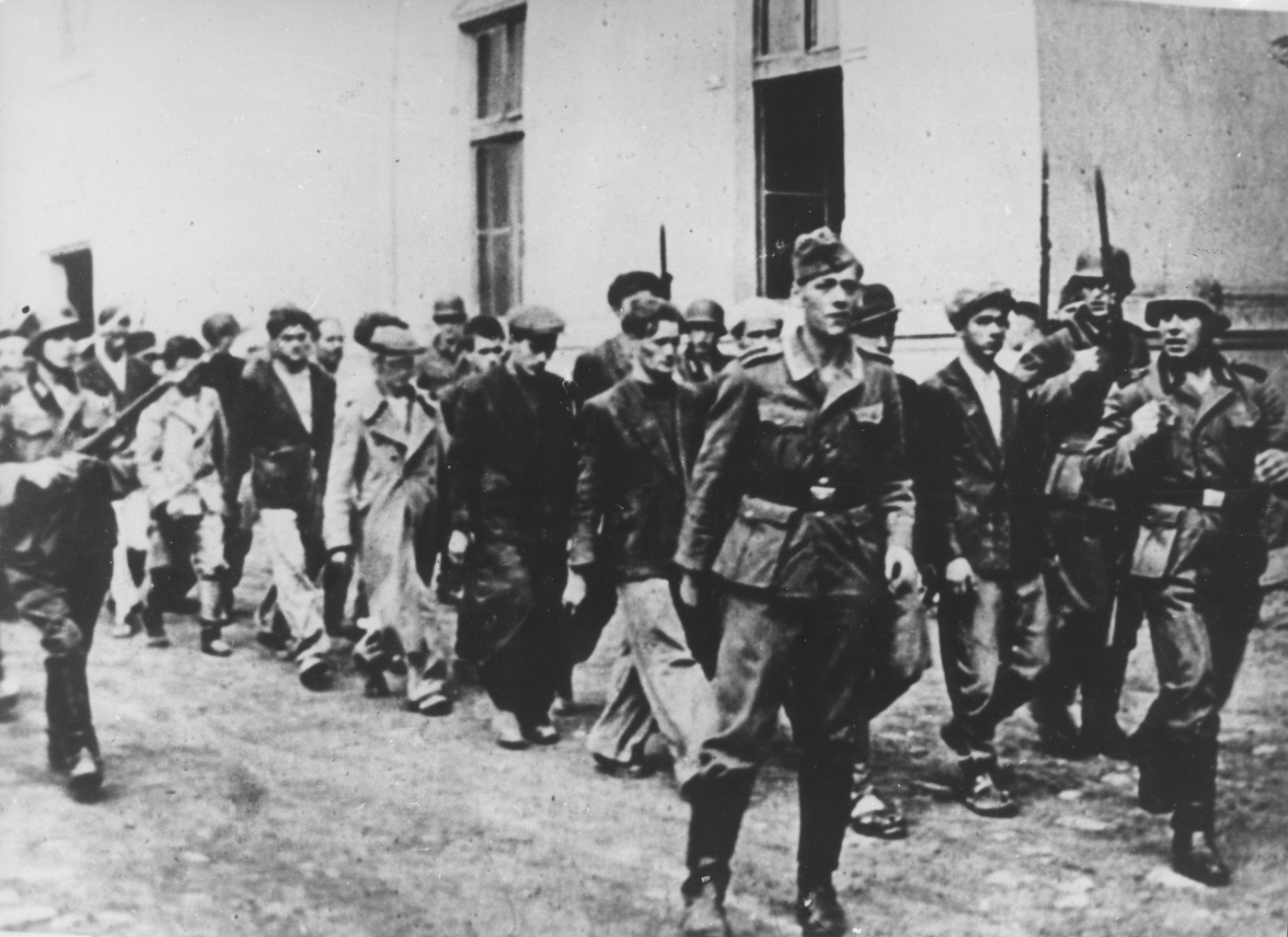
German soldiers arresting Serbian civilians prior to the Kragujevac massacre, in which Ljotić's forces participated.

On 28 March 1942, Nedić indicated to Turner that, in the event of his departure, Ljotić was the only person who could be considered his successor as leader of the Government of National Salvation. Turner remarked that "[Nedić] could not [have been] serious about this because Ljotić was a prophet and visionary, not a leader and statesman." In December 1942, the SDO was renamed the Serbian Volunteer Corps (Serbo-Croatian: Srpski dobrovoljački korpus, SDK) and placed under the command of General der Artillerie (lieutenant general) Paul Bader. Although not formally part of the Wehrmacht, the SDK received arms, ammunition, food and clothing from the Germans. Like the Serbian State Guard (Serbo-Croatian: Srpska državna straža, SDS), the SDK was under the direct command of the Higher SS and Police Leader August Meyszner and the Commanding General in Serbia. During operations its units were put under the tactical command of German divisions. It was the only group of armed Serbs that the Germans ever trusted during the war, its units often being praised for valour in action by German commanders.

The SDK helped the Gestapo track down and round up Jewish civilians who had managed to evade capture by the Germans and was involved in sending Jewish prisoners to the Banjica concentration camp. SDK units were not allowed to move from their assigned territory without German authorization. Members took an oath in which they pledged to fight to the death against both Communist forces and the Chetniks, to stay in the SDK for at least six months and to "serve the cause of the Serbian people." Ljotić himself had no control over the SDK, which was directly commanded by Mušicki. Most officers in the SDK came either from the ranks of the disbanded Royal Yugoslav Army or the Yugoslav gendarmerie. Morale was high amongst the volunteers, with education officers similar to those employed by the Soviets and the Yugoslav Partisans being assigned to each company, battalion and regiment to teach and indoctrinate soldiers and help maintain high levels of morale. According to SDK ideology, Ljotić was a "guiding spirit" in his "political and philosophical pronouncements". In his instructions to unit commanders, Ljotić stressed the importance of volunteers believing in and having respect for God. He urged them to pray regularly and warned that poor battlefield results and failure to gain the support of the Serbian public came as a result of the "wavering religiosity and faith" of commanders and their frequent cursing of God's name. Ljotić criticized the widespread practice of alcoholism, gambling and sexual decadence found among volunteers. He condemned acts of unnecessary violence when they were reported to him.

On 15 July 1942, Mihailović sent a telegram to the Yugoslav government-in-exile asking them to publicly denounce Ljotić, Nedić and the openly collaborationist Chetnik leader Kosta Pećanac as traitors. The Yugoslav government-in-exile responded by doing so publicly over BBC Radio. In October, Ljotić was forced to withdraw his two representatives in the Serbian puppet government in order to avoid being held responsible for the unpopular and difficult economic measures and food policies enacted by Nedić that month. With the surrender of Italy in September 1943, Montenegrin Chetnik commander Pavle Đurišić established ties with Ljotić. Ljotić later provided Đurišić with weapons, food, typewriters, and other supplies.

=== Retreat and death ===
In February 1944, the 2nd Battalion of the 5th SDK Regiment was sent to Montenegro to assist Đurišić's Chetniks, in accordance with Ljotić's plans. Of the 893 men who were sent, 543 were killed in action fighting the Partisans. On 6 September, Mihailović took control of several Serbian collaborationist formations, including the SDK. Ljotić sent Ratko Parežanin, a Zbor member and editor of Naša Borba, and a detachment of 30 men to Montenegro to persuade Đurišić to withdraw his Chetniks towards German-held Slovenia, where Ljotić had a plan to mass Serbian forces and launch an attack against the NDH. On 4 October, Ljotić, along with Nedić and about 300 Serbian government officials, escaped from Belgrade with German officials. In early October, the SDK was tasked to defend the Šabac bridgehead on the Sava River against the Partisans, together with some German units under the command of Colonel Jungenfeld, head of the 5th Police Regiment. The battle for Belgrade commenced on 14 October, and the Germans decided to evacuate the SDK to a location where it could be used in guarding duties and anti-Partisan actions, since it was considered unsuitable for conventional operations. Hitler ordered that the SDK be moved to the Operational Zone of the Adriatic Littoral, and placed it under the command of the Higher SS and Police Leader Odilo Globocnik. The commander of Army Group F ordered the evacuation of the SDK from the railway station in Ruma on 17 October. Between 19–21 October, the High Command of the Southeast cleared the SDK for transport west. At the end of October, Ljotić and the SDK arrived in the city of Osijek. It was here that German official Hermann Neubacher agreed to arrange their safe passage towards the Slovenian coast. While the retreat of collaborationist troops through the NDH was easy, there were exceptions. In November, the Ustaše removed between thirty and forty SDK officers from transports moving through Zagreb, after which they were summarily executed.

In December, Ljotić arranged for the release of Nikolaj Velimirović and Serbian Orthodox Patriarch Gavrilo Dožić from the Dachau concentration camp. Velimirović had been imprisoned by the Germans in July 1941 on the suspicion that he was a Chetnik sympathizer and Ljotić had written several letters to German officials that summer, urging them to release the Bishop on account that he had allegedly praised Hitler before the war. Velimirović was transferred to Dachau alongside Dožić via Budapest and Vienna in September 1944 and was held there as an "honorary prisoner". Upon being released, he and Dožić were relocated to a tourist resort and then to a hotel in Vienna as guests of the German government, where they met with Ljotić and other Serbian collaborationist officials. Discussions between the Serbian side and the Germans took place here. Ljotić and Nedić petitioned Neubacher so that the forces of Chetnik commander Momčilo Đujić could be allowed passage to Slovenia, as did Slovene collaborationist General Leon Rupnik.

The Germans urged Nedić to raise a force of 50,000 men to fight advancing Soviet forces. Nedić agreed in principle to the creation of such an army, but insisted that it could not be used to fight the Soviets. He also demanded that any new collaborationist government include Mihailović. Ljotić stood vehemently opposed to the creation of a new Serbian government in any form, insisting that the Kingdom of Yugoslavia be re-established under Peter II. This plan received the support of both Dožić and Velimirović.

In early 1945, Đurišić decided to move to the Ljubljana Gap independent of Mihailović, and arranged for Ljotić's forces already in Slovenia to meet him near Bihać in western Bosnia to assist his movement. In order to get to Bihać, Đurišić had to make a safe-conduct agreement with elements of the Armed Forces of the Independent State of Croatia and with Montenegrin separatist Sekula Drljević. He was captured by the Ustaše and Drljević's followers in April 1945 and killed along with other Chetnik leaders, some Serbian Orthodox priests and others.

Between March and April 1945, Ljotić and Mihailović exchanged messages concerning a last-ditch alliance against the Partisans. Although the agreement was reached too late to be of any practical use, the forces of Ljotić and Mihailović came together under the command of Chetnik General Miodrag Damjanović on 27 March. Together, they tried to contact the western Allies in Italy in an attempt to secure foreign aid for a proposed anti-Communist offensive to restore royalist Yugoslavia. In mid-April, at Ljotić's request, Dožić and Velimirović blessed approximately 25,000 members of the SDS, SUK, Serbian Border Guard, and the Special Police, as well as Đujić's and Dobroslav Jevđević's Chetniks and Slovene collaborators, who had gathered on the Slovenian coast.

On 22 April, Đujić contacted Ljotić and requested to meet with him in the town of Postojna to coordinate a general Chetnik–SDK withdrawal towards Italy. Ljotić left from the village of Dobravlje the following day to meet with Đujić. His chauffeur, Ratko Živadinović, had very poor eyesight and, on approaching a bridge on the Hubelj River, failed to notice that it had been partially destroyed by Partisan saboteurs.

Ljotić was killed on 23 April 1945 in the ensuing car accident in Istria near Bistrica. He was buried in a Hungarian count's abandoned crypt in the town of Šempeter pri Gorici. His funeral was held in the chapel of the Chetnik Dinara Division, conducted jointly by Dožić and Velimirović, with the latter eulogizing Ljotić as "the most loyal son of Serbdom." Velimirović added that "Ljotić did not belong only to Serbs he belonged to humanity, Europe and the world" and went on to describe him as "a politician bearing a cross" and an "ideologue of religious nationalism" whose importance "[transcended] the boundaries of Serbian politics".

=== Aftermath ===
In early May, Damjanović led most of the troops under his command into northwestern Italy, where they surrendered to the British and were placed in detention camps. Many were extradited to Yugoslavia, where between 1,500 and 3,100 were executed by the Partisans and buried in mass graves in the Kočevski Rog plateau. Others immigrated to western countries, where they established émigré organizations intended to promote Zbor's political agenda. Many of Ljotić's followers settled in Munich, where they ran their own publishing house and printed a newspaper called Iskra (Spark).

In 1974, Ljotić's brother was shot and killed by agents of the Yugoslav State Security Service (Uprava državne bezbednosti, UDBA). The antagonism between pro-Ljotić groups and those affiliated with the Chetniks continued in exile.

Following the war, Ljotić's body was removed from the tomb in which it was buried. Two theories exist about what happened to it. One claims it was removed by Ljotić's followers and taken to an unknown location following the creation of the Free Territory of Trieste in 1947. The other theory holds that Ljotić was buried in Šempeter pri Gorici until the signing of the Treaty of Osimo in 1977, when his followers removed his body from the tomb in which it was buried and took it to an unknown location outside Yugoslavia, possibly to Italy.

== Views ==
Ljotić was staunchly anti-Semitic. He is said to have advocated the extermination of Jews for years prior to the outbreak of World War II. He claimed in his speeches that a "Great Director" was behind all of the world's problems and referred to "a collective personality consisting of a people without land, language, a stable religion ... a people without roots ... the Jews." Ljotić claimed that the supposed Jewish conspiracy began during the French Revolution and was involved in every significant historical event since then. He also claimed that Jews and Freemasons were responsible for the Russian Revolution. In his writings, Ljotić portrayed Jews as being responsible for the advent of liberal democracy, Freemasonry and Communism, and, as such, enemies of both Zbor and the Yugoslav state. Ljotić advocated "liquidating the influence of Masons, Jews, and every other spiritual progeny of Jews" as the only way of preventing the outbreak of war in Yugoslavia. He also attributed the political unpopularity of Zbor to the "subversive influence" of Serbian Jews on education and the media. Nevertheless, Ljotić's antisemitism largely lacked racialist ideology due to its incongruity with Christian belief. Despite Ljotić's efforts and those of Zbor, antisemitism in Serbia did not reach the levels seen in other regions of Europe and the Jewish community there was largely spared from harassment and violence until the arrival of German troops in April 1941.

Ljotić considered fascism the only form of resistance to future global Jewish control. He lauded Hitler for exposing the "conspiracy of World Jewry" and dubbed him "the saviour of Europe". Ljotić's admiration of Germany stemmed partly from his fascination with the country's military power and fear of its political ambitions. Although the ideology of Zbor itself shared many parallels with other European fascist movements, Ljotić often stressed the differences between the fascism of Zbor and that of the fascist movements in Germany and Italy despite their numerous similarities. Most authors describe Ljotić as a fascist, but the historian Jozo Tomasevich claims this view is "too one-sided a characterization".

Ljotić believed that divine providence had "destined the Serbian people for a certain grand role". This concept became a recurring theme in his writings. A staunchly patriotic and deeply religious man who believed in the core religious ethics of the Serbian Orthodox Church, he advocated absolute loyalty to the Karađorđević dynasty. An ardent monarchist who believed in authoritarianism, the corporative organization of the state, and the integrity of Yugoslavia, he considered himself a Christian politician, His devotion to his faith earned him the nickname Mita Bogomoljac (Devotionalist Mita). He often regarded Serbian Orthodox clerics with suspicion, accusing some of being Freemasons and/or British agents, while encouraging others to join Zbor. Many did, but at least two are known to have been murdered by Ljotić's forces during the war.

== Legacy ==
Following the breakup of Yugoslavia, local councillors in Smederevo campaigned to have the town's largest square named after Ljotić. Despite the ensuing controversy, the councillors defended Ljotić's wartime record and justified the initiative by stating that "[collaboration] ... is what the biological survival of the Serbian people demanded" during World War II. Later, the Serbian magazine Pogledi published a series of articles attempting to exonerate Ljotić. In 1996, future Yugoslav President Vojislav Koštunica praised Ljotić in a public statement. Seeking to promote a romantic and nationalist picture of anti-Communism, Koštunica and his Democratic Party of Serbia (Demokratska stranka Srbije, DSS) actively campaigned to rehabilitate figures such as Ljotić and Nedić following the overthrow of Slobodan Milošević and his socialist government in October 2000. Attempts to rehabilitate Ljotić have generated a mixed response from the Serbian Orthodox Church. Memorial services were held in 1997 and 2009 for Ljotić and Milan Nedić at the St. Michael's Cathedral with both being deemed as "innocent victims of communist terror".

Using devices drawn from modern experimental theatre, Serbian playwright Nebojša Pajkić has written a stage production about Ljotić's life titled Ljotić. Stock footage of Ljotić attending the funeral of a Colonel Miloš Masalović is featured in Dušan Makavejev's 1968 film Innocence Unprotected.
