= Dimitrije Bodi =

Serbian journalist and diplomat

Dimitrije Bodi (Serbian Cyrillic: Димитрије Боди; 1850–1942) was a Serbian journalist and diplomat.

== Early life and career ==
Born into an affluent family in Belgrade of Aromanian descent, he studied law at the Belgrade Great School and at the universities of Leipzig, Berlin and Paris. From 1880 to 1885 he was a writer, secretary and chargé d'affaires at the Serbian embassy at Sofia, interrupted by the Serbo-Bulgarian War, then returned to Sofia in October 1886. He was appointed the first Serbian Consul in Bitola, and arrived on 9 April 1889 with Vice-Consul Petar Manojlović. He was the Serbian Consul in Bitola between 1889 and 1895. Branislav Nušić (1864–1938) was a secretary at the consulate during his office.

== Sources ==
- Terzić, Slavenko (2008). "Конзулат Краљевине Србије у Битољу (1889-1897)" (PDF). Историјски часопис (57): 327–342. Archived from the original (PDF) on 2018-03-24.
