= Vladimir Ljotić =

Serbian politician (1846–1912)

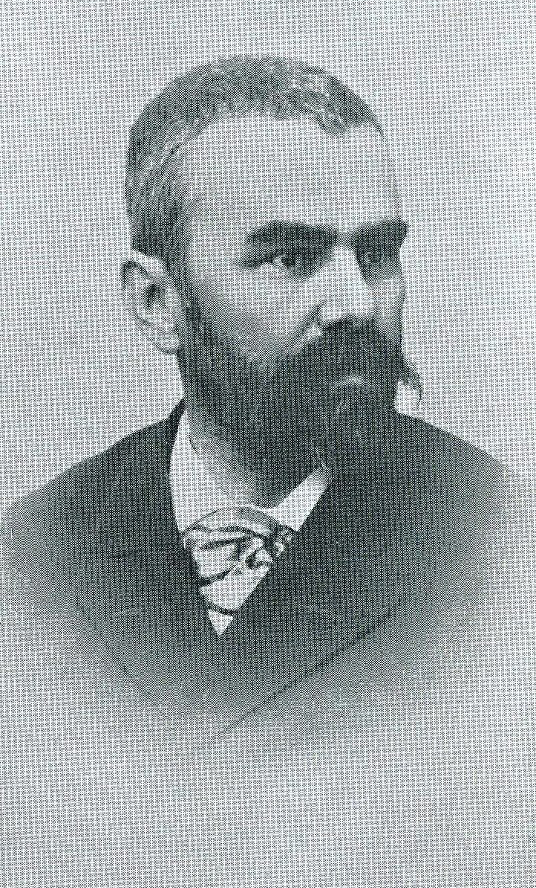
- Vladimir Ljotić, c. 1910

Personal details
- Born: 1846 Smederevo, Principality of Serbia
- Died: 27 July 1912 (aged 65–66) Smederevo, Kingdom of Serbia
- Spouse: Ljubica (née Stanojević)
- Children: Dimitrije, Jakov and Jelena
- Education: First Belgrade Gymnasium
- Alma mater: University of Belgrade Faculty of Law

Vladimir Ljotić (Serbian Cyrillic: Владимир Љотић; 1846 – 27 July 1912) was a Serbian politician and diplomat who served as the Serbian government consul to Greece.

== Biography ==
He was born into the well-known Ljotić family in Smederevo. The family was loyal to the Karađorđević dynasty which is why Vladimir's father Dimitrije "Mita" had to emigrate from Serbia following the return to the throne of the Obrenović dynasty in 1858. While abroad, Dimitirje's father was the secretary of Prince Alexander Karađorđević. During this time, young Vladimir remained in Serbia and began studying law but after the assassination of Prince Mihailo Obrenović in 1868, he had to leave the country because of the unfavourable situation for the families loyal to the Karađorđević dynasty.

He continued studying law in Vienna. He took part in the founding of the United Serbian Youth in 1870. While abroad, he was in the socialist circles around Svetozar Marković. His socialist feelings in his youth are evident as he was the first to translate The Communist Manifesto into Serbian, published in 1871 in the newspaper Pančevac. He returned to Serbia after the abdication of King Milan I on 22 February 1889. When Sava Grujić formed a government led by the People's Radical Party in 1890, Ljotić became the Serbian consul in Thessaloniki. After his diplomatic service, he continued working in politics as the president of the Municipality of Smederevo and as a member of parliament. He was one of the deputies who in Geneva in 1903 publicly called on King Peter I to inherit the Serbian throne. From 1904 to 1909, he was again the consul in Thessaloniki.

He died on 27 July 1912 and is interred near the Serbian Orthodox church at the Smederevo Old Cemetery.

== Personal life ==
His eldest son Dimitrije Ljotić was a politician and ideologue who established the Yugoslav National Movement (Zbor) in 1935 and collaborated with German occupational authorities in the Territory of the Military Commander in Serbia during World War II. Dimitrije's son was named Vladimir after Vladimir Ljotić.

His younger son Jakov was assassinated in his apartment in Munich on 8 July 1974 by agents of the Yugoslav State Security Administration.
