= Gligorije Elezović =

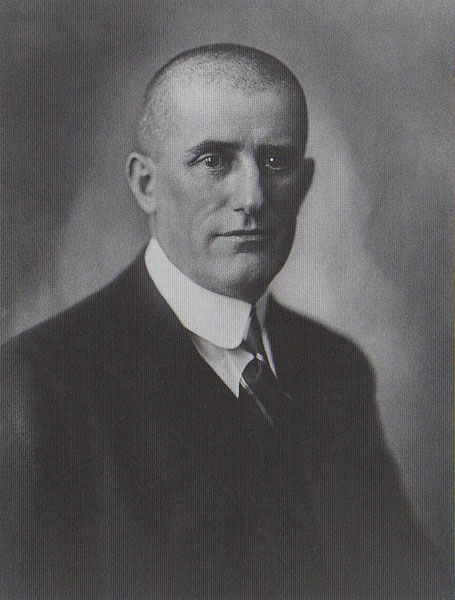
- Born: January 18, 1879; Vushtrri, Kosovo Vilayet, Ottoman Empire
- Died: October 17, 1960 (aged 81); Belgrade, Yugoslavia
- Occupation: Historian

Gligorije Elezović (Serbian Cyrillic: Глигорије Елезовић; 18 January 1879 — 17 October 1960) was a Serbian historian and member of the Serbian Academy of Science and Arts. He was also one of the founding members of the Serb Democratic League, headed by Bogdan Radenković. In 1931, the Serbian Royal Academy (Srpska kraljevska akademija) established a Committee for the Collection of Eastern Historical and Literary Sources, which employed scholars like Gligorije Elezović and Fahim Barjaktarević who were sent to archives in Istanbul to investigate Ottoman sources related to Serbian history. Elezović was a scholar from Skopje (then South Serbia) with a prolific record of publishing Ottoman documents, and trained in Albanian and Turkish languages. He compiled and published Rečnik kosovo-metohiskog dijalekta (Dictionary of Kosovo-Metohija dialect) in Belgrade in 1932.

== Works ==
- Iz carigradskih turskih arhiva Mühmme defteri, Beograd, 1951 (Zbornik za istočnjačku istorijsku i književnu građu = Recueil de matériaux d'histoire et de littérature orientale;
- Jahja paša;
- Kako su Turci posle više opsada zauzeli Beograd, Beograd, 1956 (Zbornik za istočnjačku istorijsku i književnu građu = Recueil de matériaux d'histoire et de littérature orientale;
- Kralj K´zi, Beograd, 1939;
- Ogledalo sveta ili Istorija Mehmeda Nešrije, Beograd, 1957 (Zbornik za istočnjačku istorijsku i književnu građu = Recueil de matériaux d'histoire et de littérature orientale;
- Rečnik kosovsko-metohiskog dijalekta, Beograd, 1932-1935 (Srpski dijalektološki zbornik);
- Stručnost i objektivnost dr. Henrika Barića, redovnog profesora za uporednu gramatiku indoevropskih jezika na Univerzitetu u Beogradu, Beograd, 1936;
- Turski spomenici / sabrao, sredio, preveo, protumačio i objavio Gliša Elezić, Beograd, 1940 (Zbornik za istočnjačku istorijsku i književnu građu = Recueil de matériaux d'histoire et de littérature orientale);
- Turski spomenici u Skoplju.
