= Mihailo Ristić (diplomat) =

Serbian diplomat

Mihailo Ristić (Serbian Cyrillic: Михаило Ристић; Belgrade, Principality of Serbia, 5 September 1864 — Belgrade, Serbia, Kingdom of Serbs, Croats and Slovenes, 15 August 1925) was a Serbian diplomat, consul, and representative of Ristić's main activity as a consul and diplomat was to help the Serbian people and the church in Macedonia and Old Serbia, as well as their protection from Bulgarian and Greek propaganda and armed action.

== Family ==
Mihailo Ristić is the son of Gavrilo Ristić, a Belgrade merchant, and Katarina Ćiprić from the family of Đorđe Ćipra, a Belgrade merchant.

Mihailo and Pravda had a son, Andrija "Andra" Ristić, a lawyer, who graduated from high school in Paris and the Faculty of Law in Belgrade, where he received his doctorate (1936).

== Education ==
In Belgrade, Mihailo Ristić finished primary school, First Belgrade Gymnasium and the Faculty of Law at the Velika škola. He graduated in 1886 with a degree in Jurisprudence, and after that he spent a post-graduate year studying in Paris at the School of Political Science.

== Diplomatic Service ==
Mihailo G. Ristić spent his entire working life in the diplomatic service. He started his career working in the Ministry of Foreign Affairs of Serbia in 1884. As secretary of the Ministry of Foreign Affairs, he traveled throughout Kosovo, including Pristina, and testified that the situation was so bad because of livestock raids from Albania are increasing and causing villagers to move out of Kosovo that he fears that in a generation or two there will be fewer and fewer Serbs there. That report of his on the work of the Ministry of Foreign Affairs was published. During 1893, he became the secretary of the Serbian Embassy in Constantinople. In a letter from Constantinople, Ristić expressed his doubts regarding the new administration and the preservation of Serbian heritage and assets in Turkey:

"We are in places from which we can see a little further than others, with completely selfless eyes, and for that we should be afraid... It could be that it is because I was taught to look at the good of the motherland as well as my own good, and what is happening there now is far from bringing her good things. On the contrary, her bad days are just beginning, and even a thoughtful person should already be overcome with foreboding even for the duration of it."

Although the young king Aleksandar Obrenović staged a coup d'état in January 1894, which led to the fall of the Serbian government and a change in politics. Ristić stayed in the city on the Bosphorus until the fall of 1895. In 1896 he was made temporary secretary in the Ministry of Foreign Affairs in Belgrade. He was named consul in the Serbian Consulate in Skopje in 1896 and in 1898 he was appointed secretary of the Serbian embassy in Vienna. From 1899 until 1903, he was the Serbian consul in Bitola. He was also appointed as a diplomatic agent in Sofia, but he did not receive that post. He again became the Serbian consul in Skopje from 1904 to 1906. He served in Bucharest from 1906 to 1914. Also, in 1907 he was appointed as Serbia's representative in Rome, but did not move there until 1914, owing to wartime conditions. In 1913, he was assigned to the Serbian consulate in România together with Nikola Pašić prior to the Treaty of Bucharest (1913). Ristić left for Italy in the last days of December in 1914. As the Serbian consul in Rome in March 1915, he began negotiations with the Italian government about "Arbania (Albania) and Serbia's access to the Adriatic Sea." He went from Rome to Corfu, where the assembly session opened at the end of August 1916.

During 1920, he was a delegate of the Kingdom of Serbs, Croats and Slovenes in the Danube Commission. Diplomat Ristić retired in 1924, and died a year later in Belgrade.

== Activity ==
Ristić's main activity as a consul and diplomat was protecting national interest and the awakening of national consciousness in Macedonia.

== Sources ==
- Биљана Вучетић (1 September 2012). Наша ствар у Османском царству: Our Issue in the Ottoman Empire. Istorijski institut. pp. 34–. ISBN 978-86-7743-095-5.
- Документи о спољној политици Краљевине Србије 1903-1914. Srpska akademija nauka i umetnosti. 1998.
