= Bogdan Radenković =

Serbian politician and pan-Serbian activist

- Богдан Раденковић
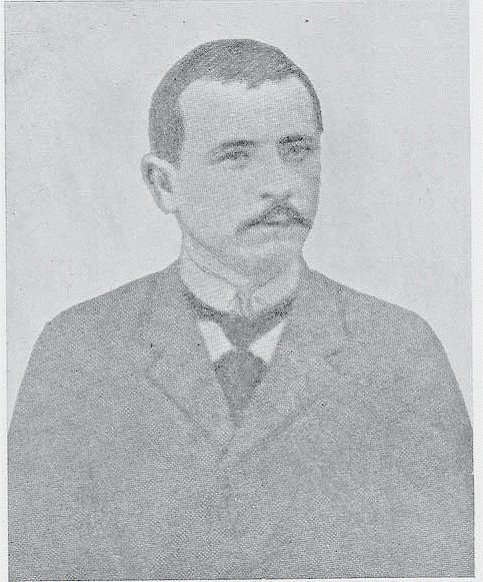
- Bogdan Radenković
- Born: 1874
- Died: August 30, 1917

Bogdan Radenković (Serbian Cyrillic: Богдан Раденковић; 1874 – 30 July 1917) was a Serb activist, an organizer of the Serbian Chetnik Organization and one of the founders of the Black Hand. He was a leading civilian activist of the Pan-Serb movement in the early 20th century.

== Biography ==
Radenković was born in 1874 in Srbovac, a village in the municipality of Zvečan, then part of the Ottoman Empire.

As a university graduate and a tonsured monk with a chosen name Vasilije, he became a secretary to the Serbian Orthodox Metropolitanate of Skopje.

Bogdan Radenković was a member of the Serbian Committee of Skopje and the main organizer of the Serbian Chetnik action in the Ottoman Empire. He was an intermediary between the Serbian consul Mihailo G. Ristić and the Chetnik organization and their supporters.

The Serb Democratic League in the Ottoman Empire (Serbian: Српска демократска лига у Отоманској царевини) was an Ottoman Serb political organisation established on August 13, 1908, at the First Serb Conference (August 10–13), immediately after the Young Turk Revolution.

With the founding of the Serb Democratic League, it became the first political party to represent the interests of the Serbs in the Ottoman Empire. The Serbian Democratic League sent to Thessaloniki a small group led by Bogdan Radenković to negotiate with the Central Young Turk Board.

The Serbian demands were as follows: for the three non-Muslim “ethnic groups” – Serbian, Greek, and Bulgarian – to get an equal number of seats in the Ottoman Parliament. However, the Young Turks rejected this concept and conditioned the electoral agreement with the Serbs on a deal based on broader grounds that would not have a national background.

In 1910, as a representative of the party, he was sent to Istanbul, where he urged the Turkish authorities to stop using their troops (Bashi-bazouk) to terrorize the Serbian population in Gjilan. The Sublime Porte denied the violence in Kosovo, claiming that it was a fabrication. Yet to the Albanians are credited many of the outrages that have been committed in Old Serbia, where Turkish troops are alleged to have massacred more than 60,000 Christians.

After bishop Nićifor Perić of Raška-Prizren withdrew from his office (1911), owing to disagreement with the Serbian diplomacy, the Patriarchate of Constantinople appointed Bishop Gavrilo Dožić as successor, as the Serbian diplomacy wanted. There was a conflict within the Serbian Church regarding the appointment of Gavrilo; the "Old Serbs" (clergy from Kosovo and Old Serbia) wanted their candidate, the previous secretary of the Eparchy of Skoplje, monk Vasilije (Bogdan) Radenković. While waiting for the Ottoman government approval, the Serbian government changed the decision and ordered through the consuls that Ottoman Serbs request that Radenković be appointed instead. However, Gavrilo ended up being chosen.

Radenković and a few others, particularly Colonel Dragutin Dimitrijević, were the initiators of the creation of the "Unification or Death" organization, better known as the Black Hand, in 1911.

After the occupation of Serbia in late 1915 by the Germans, Austrians, Hungarians, and Bulgarians, Bogdan Radenković withdrew through Montenegro, Albania to the island of Corfu, where he was temporarily hospitalized with tuberculosis. When his condition improved somewhat, he was sent to Athens and from there to Korçë County in eastern Albania. There he stayed until August 1916, when a surprise Bulgarian invasion took place and he was forced to flee. He was almost caught while escaping, but eventually managed to reach Thessaloniki, where the Serbian Supreme Command was stationed. Weak, suffering from tuberculosis after the harrowing escape from Korçë, he was advised by his doctor to go to Egypt, where the climate may improve his condition. Nikola Pašić, however, purposefully delayed his departure until his condition worsened.

The Serbian Supreme Command on 15 March 1917 sent a warrant for Bogdan Radenković's arrest, though the main accused was Dragutin Dimitrijević, better known as Apis, and his associates. Radenković was sentenced to death for allegedly plotting against the prince regent Aleksandar Karadjordjević and Nikola Pašić, the head of the Serbian government-in-exile, even though there was no concrete evidence that could link him to such an outrageous plot, not him, nor Dimitrijević, nor others.

Bogdan Radenković died of tuberculosis in a prison hospital in Thessaloniki, Greece, on 30 July 1917. Years later, it was revealed that Nikola Pašić fabricated the story to rid himself of Dragutin Dimitrijević and other Serbian nationalists who may pose a threat after the war during election time. All the accused were vindicated, but many years later.

== See also ==
- List of Chetnik voivodes

== Sources and further reading ==
- Vučetić, Biljana (2018). Bogdan Radenković (1874 – 1917) : Destiny of a Serbian Nationalist. Istorijski institut. ISBN 9788677431235.
- Vasa Kazimirović (1 January 1997). Crna ruka: ličnosti i događaji u Srbiji od prevrata 1903. do Solunskog procesa 1917. godine. Prizma. ISBN 978-86-7084-016-4.
- Dragutin T. Dimitrijević-Apis (1918). Tajna prevratna organizacija. Velika Srbija.
- Hadži-Vasiljević, Jovan (1928). Četnička akcija u Staroj Srbiji i Maćedoniji (in Serbian). Belgrade: Sv. Sava.
- Биљана Вучетић (2012). Наша ствар у Османском царству: Our Issue in the Ottoman Empire. Istorijski institut. pp. 73–74. ISBN 978-86-7743-095-5.
- Radan, Peter; Pavković, Aleksandar (1997). The Serbs and Their Leaders in the Twentieth Century. Ashgate. ISBN 978-1-85521-891-8.
- Radić, Radmila (1998). Hilandar u državnoj politici kraljevine Srbije i Jugoslavije 1896-1970. Službeni list SRJ. ISBN 9788635504018.
