= Svetislav Vulović =

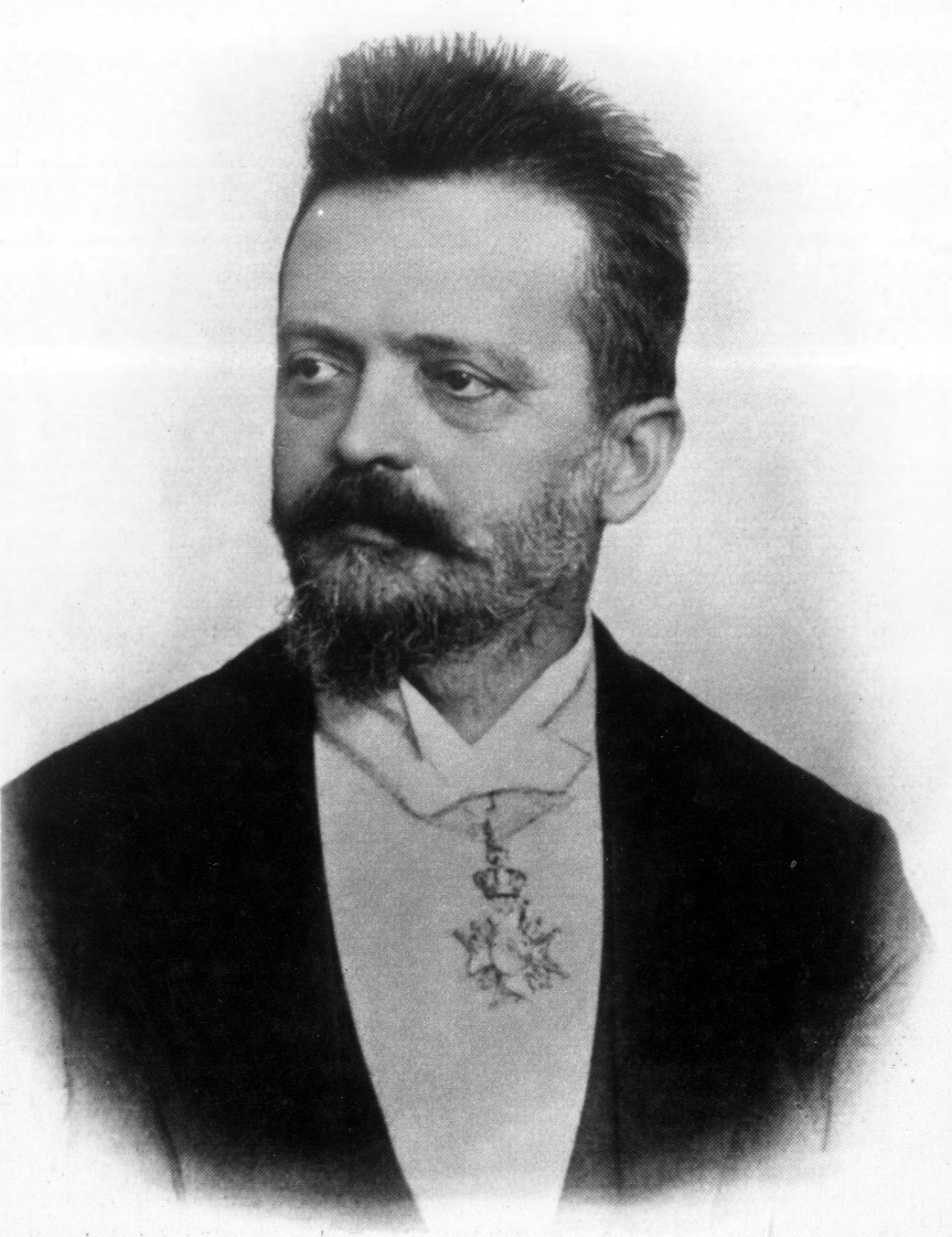
- A photo of Vulović
- Born: 29 November 1847; Ivanjica, Principality of Serbia
- Died: 3 May 1898 (aged 50); Belgrade, Kingdom of Serbia
- Occupations: writer, pedagogue, and literary criticr

Svetislav Vulović (Serbian: Светислав Вуловић; 29 November 1847 – 3 May 1898) was a Serbian teacher, literary critic and literary historian.

== Early life and education ==
Svetislav Vulović was born on 29 November 1847 in Ivanjica.

He completed his elementary education in his hometown, before graduating from gymnasium in Kraljevo. He studied law at the Belgrade Velika škola, graduating in 1868.

== Career ==
After graduation, Vulović briefly worked in court from 1868 to 1869. He taught at a Belgrade gymnasium from 1870 to 1881, his career interrupted by the Serbian–Turkish Wars of 1876 to 1878. In 1879, Vulović became a member of the Serbian Learned Society. The society would merge into the Serbian Royal Academy in 1892.

In 1881 he was offered the post of professor of South Slavic Literature at the Belgrade Higher School's Faculty of Philosophy. He would teach there from 1881 to 1898, also serving as rector during the 1893/94 school year. In 1887, Vulović became a member of the Serbian Royal Academy of Sciences.

== Personal life and death ==
Vulović was married to Mileva Milka Vulović, an early Serbian women's rights activist.

He died on 3 May 1898 in Belgrade.

== Literary criticism ==
On joining the university he tried to make a living in literature. It was there that he began the preparation of numerous valuable tracts on the history of Serbian literature during the Middle Ages to the present day, and of dissertations and discussions on points of literary interest, as well as the publication of his various philosophical, legal poetical and other works absorbed the greater part of his time. These brought him into communication with the most distinguished scholars and literary critics of Europe and Russia.

He was under the influence of French literary critic Charles Augustin Sainte-Beuve and German political and literary writer Ludwig Börne.

== Works ==
- Đura Jakšić, poet and painter (1875),
- Art narrative in the latest Serbian literature (1880),
- From the old Serbian literature I (1885),
- Njegoš, Serbian poet (1887),
- Branko Radičević I - II (1889, 1890),
- Srpske čitanke (1874, 1875), excellent anthologies of Serbian literature from which literary education was acquired by several generations,
- Beleške o arhiepiskopu Nikodimu (Notes on Archbishop Nikodim Milaš, 1894).
