= Vladimir Karić =

Geographer, pedagogue, publicist and diplomat

Vladimir Karić

Vladimir Karić (2 November 1848 – 8 January 1894) was a Serbian geographer, pedagogue, publicist and diplomat.

== Biography ==
Vladimir was born in November 1848 in Svetlić, near Kragujevac. He comes from a poor official family and during his schooling he supported himself by work. He went to elementary school in Kragujevac and attended high schools in Kragujevac, Šabac and Belgrade. He graduated from the Faculty of Law at the Velika škola in Belgrade in 1868. He started his career in the profession, as an intern in the Šabac court. In the same city, he taught at the city's oldest high school for a while as a substitute teacher. In 1870, he became a clerk at the City Hall in Požarevac. In the same year, he moved to Šabac, where he began his long-term career as a high school teacher in a local high school.

== Education ==
In 1870, he was appointed deputy of the Sabac lower grammar school. And after passing the professor's exam in 1873, he continued his educational work in Šabac. He greatly influenced the scientific orientations of his student from the Sabac high school – the future scientist and academician Jovan Cvijić. Karić showed his students the concepts of the future geography textbook in 1879. He returned to Požarevac in 1873, now as a professor of high school geography. In a few years, in 1879, he was transferred again to the Sabac High School. He came to Belgrade with the service in 1881. Since then, he has started publishing geography textbooks. Karić remained as a teacher until 1888 when he was appointed clerk in the Ministry of Education and Church Affairs. In 1879, he wrote a textbook entitled "Geography". He soon expanded his textbook by publishing Geography in two volumes. In 1881, he was elected an extraordinary member of the Education Council. In 1882, he published the book "Serbian Land", where he described in geological, geographical and statistical terms the territories inhabited by Serbs at that time. Karić wrote political-geographical essays in which he expressed his deep love for his country and its troubles. In 1887, he wrote the voluminous work "Serbia" in three volumes. This book was a notable exhibit at the World's Fair in Paris in 1889. Under the pseudonym "V. Crnojević", Karić published a valuable historical-travel study in 1889 entitled "Constantinople, Mount Athos, Thessaloniki".

== Diplomatic activity ==
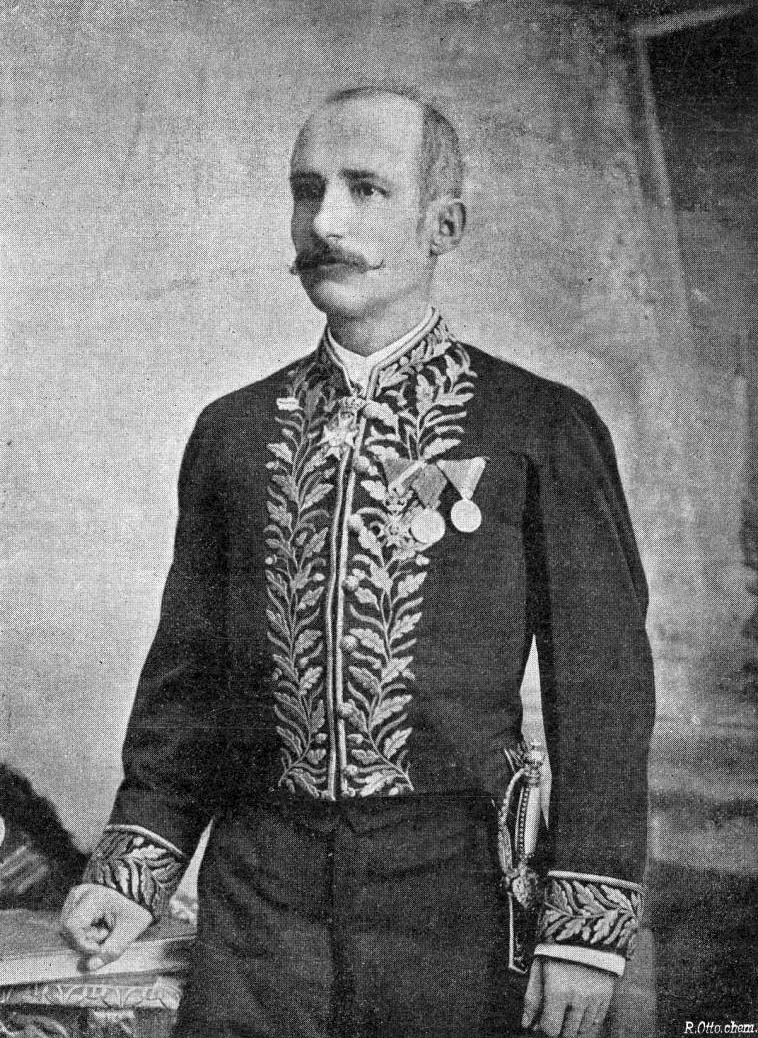
Vladimir Karić

In 1889, due to the demonstrated quality in the work of the Ministry of Education and Church Affairs in terms of the development of Serbian education in Old Serbia and Macedonia, he was appointed head of the newly established Educational and Political Department of the Ministry of Foreign Affairs. That department was formed precisely because of the spread of Serbian influence and education in Old Serbia and Macedonia, which were endangered by the activities of the Bulgarian Exarchate. He became the head of the Serbian propaganda mission in the unliberated parts of Serbia. Vladimir Karić was a clear representative of enlightened nationalism among Serbs. On October 13, 1889, he was appointed consul of the Serbian consulate in Skopje. Karic worked to strengthen Skopje as a center from which Serbian influence would spread and strengthen the Serbian national consciousness in the Ottoman Empire. He sought to increase the number of Serbian schools, churches, priests and teachers, bookstores and connect the national workers there. He remained in the consular position until 1892, where he showed significant success in the affairs of Serbian national policy. He was a close friend and associate of Jovan Ristić in those years. At his personal request, due to disagreement with the new minister, he left Skopje in October 1892.

== Return to Belgrade ==
Upon his return to Belgrade, in 1892, he taught until his retirement in 1893 at the Lower Belgrade Gymnasium. Due to impaired health (tuberculosis), he went to the Baden air spa in Tyrol, where he died on 8 January 1894. His follower Jovan Cvijić spoke at the service in the Serbian Orthodox Church Cathedral in Belgrade. By his last will and testament, the modest Karić bequeathed all his property to the Geographical Department of the Velika škola.

== Literature ==
- "Glasnik Etnografskog muzeja u Beogradu", Beograd 43/1979. years
- "Politika", Belgrade in 1929
- "Zbornik Matice srpske za istoriju", Novi Sad 1992
- "Politika", Belgrade in 1929
- Vladimir Karić and Biljana Vučetić: "Our Thing in the Ottoman Empire", Belgrade 2012
- M. Vojvodić, Stojan Novaković and Vladimir Karić, Belgrade 2003, 26–172.
- Small Encyclopedia of Education, Belgrade 1978
