= Grigoriy Shcherbina =

Ukrainian-born Russian diplomat

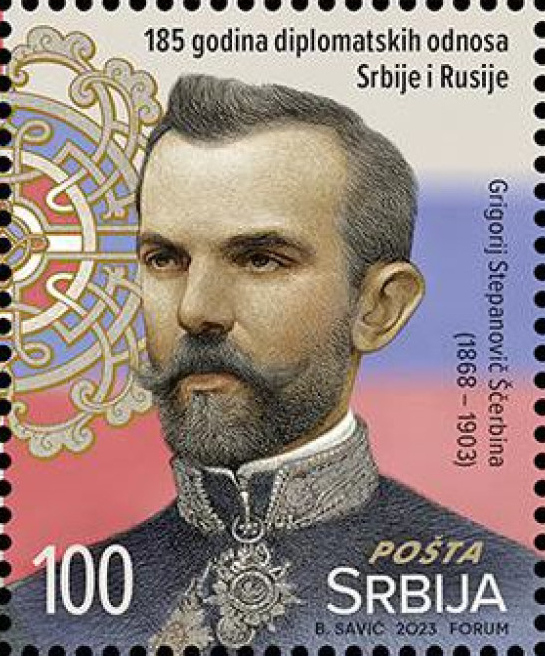
Shcherbina on a 2023 stamp of Serbia

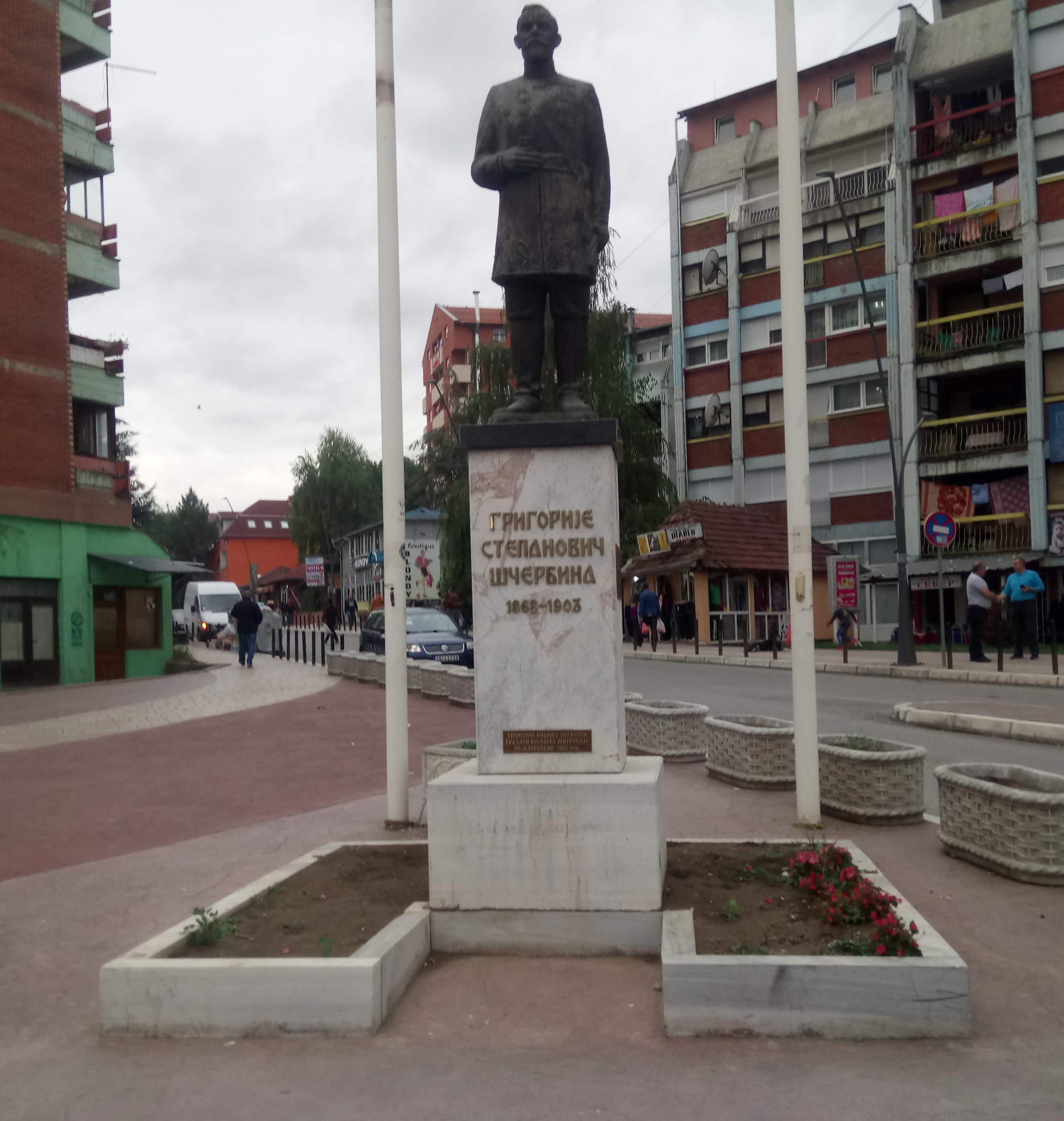
Shcherbina monument in North Mitrovica.

Grigoriy Stepanovich Shcherbina (Russian: Григорий Степанович Щербина, Ukrainian: Григорій Степанович Щербина, November 29, 1868 – April 8, 1903) was a Russian diplomat of Ukrainian origin, the Russian Consul seated in Mitrovica, Kosovo Vilayet, Ottoman Empire from late 1902 until his death in April 1903 from shot wounds. The Russian Empire decided to open a consulate in Mitrovica following the Kolašin affair (1901). At the beginning of 1903, Muslim Albanian chieftains met in Yakova after the Ottoman reform plans, and decided to murder leading Serbs in the Sanjak of İpek and compel other Serbs to flee to Serbia or be Turkicized. The plan was to rout Ottoman authorities in Peć, kill the notable Serbs, then move to Mitrovica and confront the Russian consulate. While supervising Ottoman defending troops, on 31 March, Shcherbina was shot by an Ottoman Albanian corporal by the name of Halit Ibrahimi Popofci under orders of Isa Bolenti. Grigoriy Schterbina died eight days later.

Albanian sources state that the soldier was Halit Ibrahim Popofci, from Zhegër near Gjilan, and that he shot Shcherbina due to his Anti-albanian policies.

== Biography ==
Shcherbina entered the diplomatic service of Imperial Russia when he was only 23 and was one of its most promising civil servants. He spoke Turkish, Arabic, Albanian, Armenian, Bulgarian and Serbian extraordinarily well. After gaining diplomatic experience in Constantinople, Skopje, Cetinje, and Skadar. In 1902, Shcherbina was forced by the Russian authorities to enter the service as Russian Consul in Mitrovica and the Albanian nationalists shot him, according to Durham. A year later, the 35-year-old Consul died of bullet wounds sustained in the assassination attempt by an Albanian soldier.

Each year on 31 March, the anniversary of the death of the Russian consul Grigory Shcherbina is commemorated in the north part of Kosovska Mitrovica where his monument situated.
