= Serb Democratic League =

Serbian political party in the Ottoman Empire

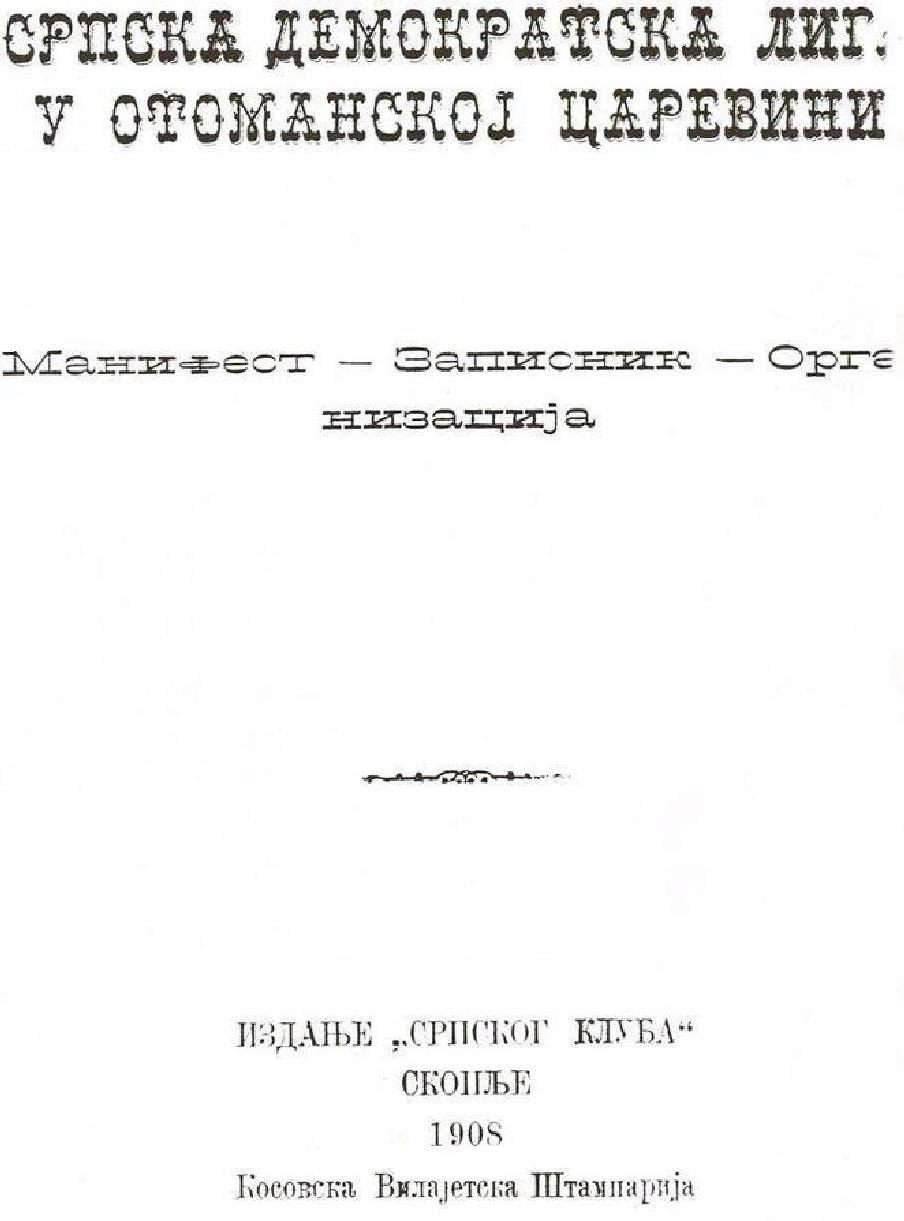

The Serb Democratic League in the Ottoman Empire (Serbian: Српска демократска лига у Отоманској царевини) was an Ottoman Serb political organisation established on August 13, 1908, at the First Serb Conference (August 10–13), immediately after the Young Turk Revolution.

It included the Serb elite of Old Raška, Kosovo and Metohija, and Vardar Macedonia and Greek Macedonia. It included many members of the Serbian Chetnik Organization.

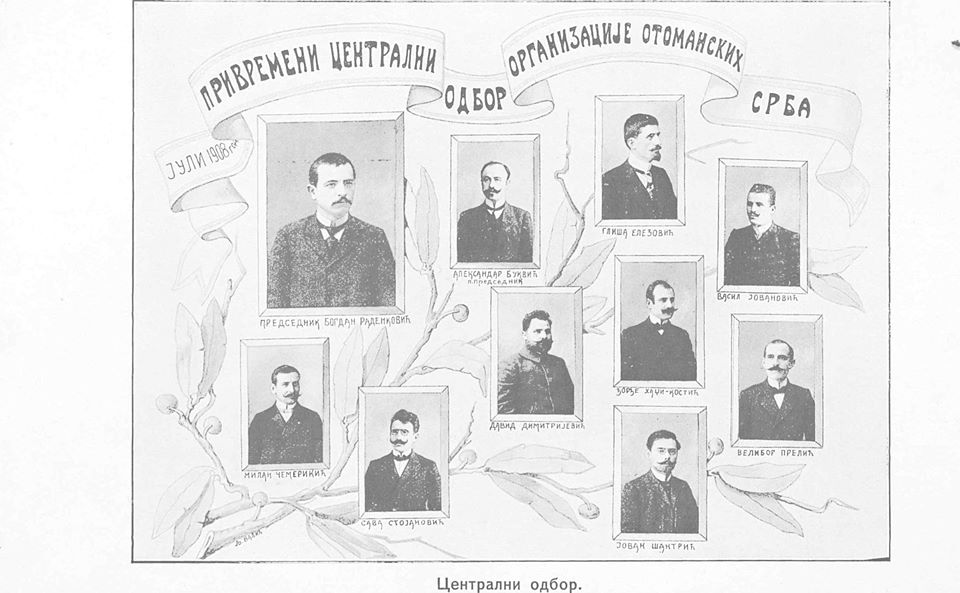
Temporary Central Board of the Organization of Ottoman Serbs, July 1908

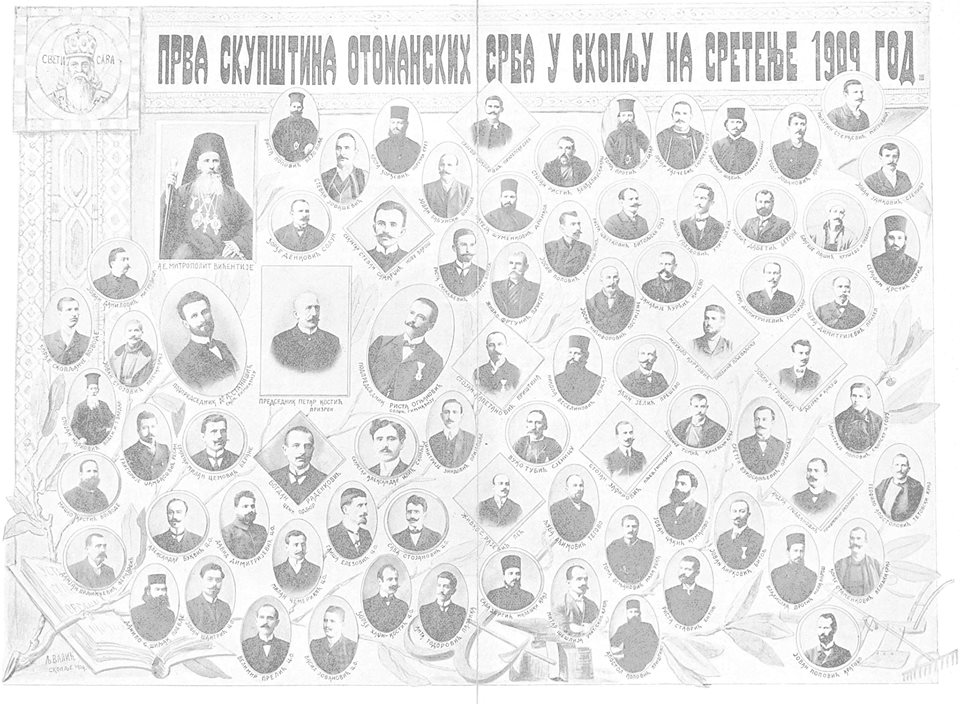
First Assembly of Ottoman Serbs in Skoplje on Sretenje, 1909

== See also ==
- Serb People's Radical Party, political party in Austria-Hungary
- Serb Independent Party, political party in Austria-Hungary
- Narodna Odbrana, Serbian nationalist group
