= Naprata =

- Directed by: Mladen Milosavljević
- Written by: Mladen Milosavljević
- Starring: Marko Backović, Ivana Bogdanović, Saša Tomić, Branko Radaković, Srećko Obradović, Milanče Marković, Zlatimir Pantić
- Cinematography: Marko Backović, Saša Tomić
- Edited by: Miloš Kasalović
- Production company: Panzova Pictures
- Release date: 16 October 2013 (Belgrade)
- Running time: 65 minutes
- Country: Serbia
- Language: Serbian

Naprata is among the first Serbian horror films made in the "found footage" style. The most famous found footage films worldwide are The Blair Witch Project and Paranormal Activity. Naprata was directed by Mladen Milosavljević from Veliko Orašje, inspired by folklore fantasy.

Naprata was filmed in the villages of Veliko Orašje and Krnjevo, and one of the scenes was filmed in the courtyard of the oldest rural school in Serbia, located in Krnjevo in the Velika Plana municipality.

The film premiered on October 16, 2013 at the eighth Serbian Fantasy Film Festival (FSFF) held at the Youth Center in Belgrade. At that festival, it won two Koskars – for best story and the audience award.

== Plot ==
Inspired by a famous internet video clip in which a son beats his mother, a TV crew from Belgrade comes to a small, remote village to film a report on violence against women. While searching for the people involved in the clip and asking the locals, they meet a local supernatural expert who informs them about a ritual to summon an ancient demon, the "naprata." Eager to capture the first authentic footage of something supernatural, they change their filming plans.

Blinded by the potential success of the footage, they ignore an old saying: "It's better to believe than to find out for yourself."
