= Government of National Salvation =

World War II Serbian puppet government

- Serbian: Министарски савет Србије, romanized: Ministarski savet Srbije); German: Ministerrat von Serbien (Council of Ministers of Serbia)

Overview
- Established: 29 August 1941
- Dissolved: 4 October 1944 (Belgrade Offensive)
- Polity: German-occupied territory of Serbia
- Leader: Milan Nedić
- Headquarters: Belgrade

The Government of National Salvation (Serbian: Влада народног спаса, romanized: Vlada narodnog spasa; German: Regierung der nationalen Rettung, abbr. VNS), also referred to as Nedić's government or Nedić's regime, was the colloquial name of the second Serbian collaborationist puppet government established after the Commissioner Government in the German-occupied territory of Serbia (Note: The official name of the occupied territory was Territory of the Military Commander in Serbia, translated from German: Gebiet des Militärbefehlshaber Serbiens) during World War II in Yugoslavia. Appointed by the German Military Commander in Serbia, it operated from 29 August 1941 to 4 October 1944. Unlike the Independent State of Croatia, the regime in occupied Serbia was never accorded status in international law and did not enjoy formal diplomatic recognition of the Axis powers.

Although the regime was tolerated by many Serbs living in the occupied territory and even actively supported by a part of the Serb population, it was unpopular with a majority of the population who supported one of the two factions which at first were perceived as connected to the Allied Powers, the Yugoslav Partisans or the royalist Chetniks. The Prime Minister throughout was General Milan Nedić. The Government of National Salvation was evacuated from Belgrade through Budapest to Kitzbühel in the first week of October 1944, before the German withdrawal from the occupied territory was complete.

== History ==
=== Formation ===
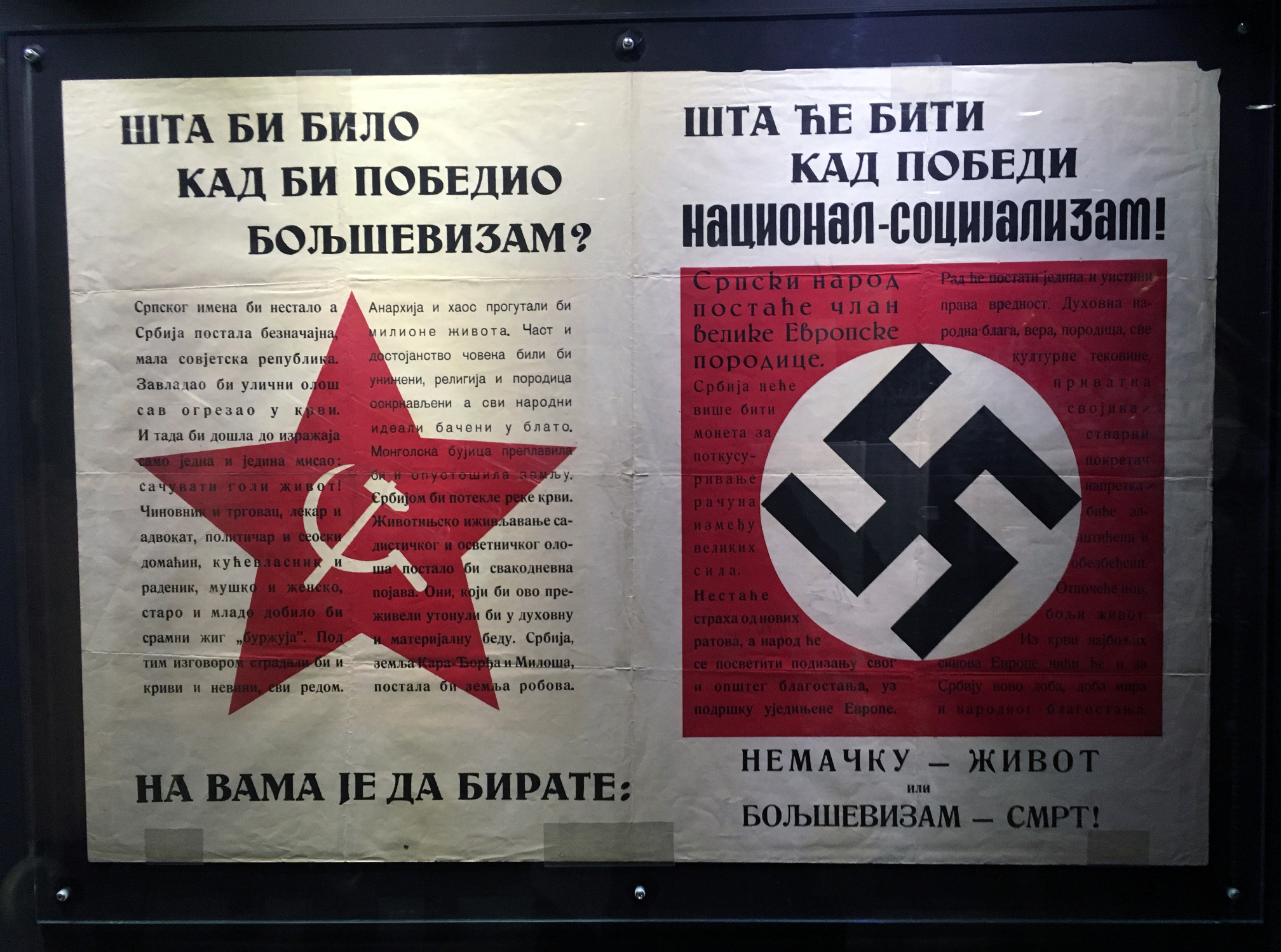
A Nedić administration propaganda poster describing the negative future for Serbia if Bolshevism won the war and the positive results if Nazism achieved victory

Following the Axis invasion of Yugoslavia in April 1941, Germany put Serbia proper under the authority of a military government to maintain control over important resources. Those included two major transportation routes, the Danube River waterway and the railroad line connecting Europe with Bulgaria and Greece, along with the nonferrous metals that Serbia produced. The Germans set up a puppet government to avoid tying up too much German manpower. The first puppet government was the short-lived Commissioner Government, established on 30 May 1941 under Milan Aćimović. He was an anti-communist and had been in contact with the German police before the war. His cabinet consisted of nine members, many of whom were former cabinet members under the Kingdom of Yugoslavia and were known to be pro-German. The regime lacked any real power and was no more than an instrument of the Germans. The Commissioner Government collapsed after Dimitrije Ljotić withdrew two of his ministers from the government. However, Aćimović entered Nedić's government as minister of interior. As communist partisans began an insurgency against the German occupiers and the Aćimović government, Harald Turner, an SS commander in the German military administration, suggested strengthening and reforming the administration. General Milan Nedić, formerly chief of general staff of the Royal Yugoslav Army, was selected to be the head of the new government.

On 29 August 1941, Nedić was installed as the prime minister following the resignation of the Commissioner Administration. The Germans threatened to bring in Bulgarian troops to occupy the whole of Serbia, including Belgrade, if he did not accept. Nedić agreed only after the Germans persuaded Kosta Pećanac to place himself and his detachments at the disposal of the occupation regime. The regime was tolerated by a significant portion of the population and even enthusiastically supported by a part of the population and certain social strate, while it remained unpopular with a majority of the Serb people. Those who supported the regime came from the military class, the state bureaucracy, the Serbian intelligentsia and part of the general population. The popularity of the regime in part of the population was downplayed in the post-war era both by Serb nationalists and the official Yugoslav discourse. His first cabinet included fifteen members. The Germans were particularly impressed with his reputation as a man of authority, although the regime did not have any international standing even among the Axis powers. Although Heinrich Danckelmann, the Military Commander in Serbia, promised to give Nedić and his government a high degree of authority and independence, the deal was never written down, so the oral agreements were void after Danckelmann was replaced by General Franz Böhme. Although Turner attempted to convince Danckellmann's successors to grant the Government of National Salvation more power, his requests were ignored. They did allow him to organize a Serbian State Guard, unifying the Serbian gendarmerie and other formations.

=== Waning power ===
In his first radio address on Radio Belgrade, Nedić condemned the communist-led resistance and gave them an ultimatum to put down their arms. Nedić soon lost control of the State Guard, when, on 22 January 1942, General August Meyszner, the Higher SS and Police Leader in Serbia, took command of it. The Government of National Salvation gradually lost more power to the Germans, who intervened in even the smallest decisions that it made. Nedić's already small following among Serbians declined even further as a result of this weakness. He attempted to resign twice, but each time he ended up changing his mind and withdrawing the resignation. Nedić also ended up reorganizing his cabinet, removing two ministers in October 1942 and several more in November 1943, at which point he also took over as the interior minister.

Dimitrije Ljotić, the leader of one of the most effective anti-partisan detachments, the Serbian Volunteer Corps, maintained some degree of influence over the prime minister, although he refused to take a government position himself. Nedić once told Turner that Ljotić would make a good successor in the event of his departure. The SDK was at first not part of the SS or the Wehrmacht. Instead, it was nominally directed by the puppet government, and was paid for by the government. In 1944, it officially became part of the Waffen-SS, and since the end of the war was nearing, there was neither enough time nor supplies to equip it with SS uniforms, so the SDK stayed with mainly Italian/Yugoslav uniforms.

Relations between the Serbian government and the Bulgarian occupation forces in Serbia were strained. A colonel in the Bulgarian 6th Division noted that the local population hated the Bulgarians as much as they hated the Germans. Nedić frequently complained about their presence to the Germans and demanded that the Bulgarians withdraw from Serbia. In the Banat, a special regime was established, administered by the local German minority. The Serbian puppet government recognized it as the civilian administration of the region, under Belgrade's nominal control. A detachment of the SDS was created there, the Banat State Guard, which recruited its members from the local ethnic Germans. It had 94 officers and 846 privates as of March 1942.

In March 1942, in the face of the government's growing unpopularity, Nedić sent a memorandum to the Germans with suggestions to improve its standing. They included having elections for a head of state, forming a single national political party, giving the head of state command of the SDS, only interfering with the higher levels of the Serbian government to give them more freedom to work with the Serbian people, and withdrawing Bulgarian forces from Serbia. General Paul Bader, the new Military Commander in Serbia, had Turner speak with Nedić, pressuring the prime minister to withdraw the memorandum. Backed by the entire cabinet, Nedić refused to withdraw it and asked for the memorandum to be sent to Berlin for consideration. It was sent, where the German high command ignored it. Nedić tried again in September 1942, this time threatening to resign for greater effect. The Germans declined it but persuaded him to remain in office. German Wehrmacht officers in Serbia nonetheless still considered Nedić to be loyal and praised him for being a dependable man.

=== Relations with the Chetniks ===
Cooperation between the Serbian puppet government and the Chetniks began in the fall of 1941, during a major German operation in western Serbia against the partisans. The Chetniks wanted to minimize Serbian casualties from German reprisals by defeating the partisans, and later wanted to gain a solid base in the Nedić regime's military and administrative apparatus, so that they could seize control of the government before the partisans at the end of the war. Many members of the Serbian government maintained contact with the Chetniks, including interior minister Milan Aćimović. He later served as the liaison between the Germans and the Chetnik leader Draža Mihailović. Several Chetnik units "legalized" themselves by serving with the quisling forces of the Serbian puppet government, but at the same time, Chetniks also took part in activities against the Germans and their auxiliaries. The government's armed forces gave weapons and other supplies to the Chetniks and provided them with intelligence.

Legalized Chetnik forces included the Pećanac Chetniks, who fought against the partisans with the Serbian government forces beginning in August 1941. The Germans did not trust them. At the peak of their strength in May 1942, the legalized Chetniks numbered at 13,400 officers, non-commissioned officers, and men. Chetnik detachments were, as with the other Serbian forces, under German command. Most legalized Chetnik detachments were dissolved in late 1942, with the last being dissolved in March 1943. Some of them joined the SDS or SDK, but the majority returned to Mihailović's illegal Chetniks. The Chetniks made a number of agreements with the Germans in 1943, bypassing the Serbian puppet government, which resulted in Nedić and his regime losing what support it had left among the people. Many members of his administration, including government officials, as well as military and police officers, made secret deals with the Chetniks themselves. Those included Aćimović, Belgrade's mayor, Dragomir Jovanović, and General Miodrag Damjanović of the State Guard.

=== Accepting refugees ===
One area in which the Government of National Salvation did have success was the acceptance of Serb refugees that fled from neighboring states, most notably the Independent State of Croatia (NDH). The Germans transferred some Slovenes to the Serbian rump state as that territory was incorporated into Nazi Germany. Other sources of refugees included Bulgarian-occupied Macedonia and the Italian governorate of Montenegro. Franz Neuhausen, the German plenipotentiary for economic affairs, estimated that there were about 420,000 refugees in Serbia. The Nedić regime created a Committee for Refugees in May 1941 to handle them, headed by Toma Maksimović, a former factory boss from Borovo. While the committee had difficulties in finding enough food, housing, and other supplies for them, the refugees were well received by the Serbian population. Food was especially difficult to provide due to the Germans exporting it to the Reich or to German forces in Greece.

German officials pointed out that transfers of people from the NDH to Serbia increased the unrest in the territory, because some refugees joined the Partisans or the Chetniks. The Serbian government, and some German officials, wanted to repatriate some Serbs to the places that they came from, but this was denied by the military administration, due to the difficulties that would be present for them in the NDH.

=== Final days of the regime ===
As the tide turned against Germany during the war, the German occupational administration sought to ally all anti-communist forces to fight against the partisans, including Mihailović's Chetniks. Hermann Neubacher was made the special envoy of the German foreign ministry in Belgrade in 1943. He had formerly worked in Romania and Greece, and sought to improve the German military position in the region by increasing the power of the Nedić regime. He planned to form a "Greater Serbian Federation", which would have included Serbia and Montenegro. He also attempted to curtail the authority of the German military in Serbia, return command of the SDS to Nedić, and to reopen the University of Belgrade. None of his ideas came to fruition, because they had no support from foreign minister Joachim von Ribbentrop, nor from anyone else in the German government. Hitler himself had no wish to strengthen the puppet government as he thought that it was unreliable. As Nedić's power decreased even further, more members of his government started working for the Chetniks.

The Germans' workings with the Chetniks angered Nedić, who wrote a nine-page list of complaints to the Germans on 22 February 1944. The list included complaints that the Germans were now giving Mihailović more power than he had. Nedić criticized the large burden of occupation costs and German interference at even the lowest levels of his administration, and the fact that none of his proposals for improving the situation were accepted. After that, the Military Commander in Serbia (Hans Felber, who replaced Bader in 1943) asked Nedić for his opinion about a change of policy towards the Chetniks, but it was also ignored. Only one of Neubacher's policy changes were successful, the easing of reprisals against the Serbian population by German forces.

Nedić and Mihailović met on 20 August 1944 to discuss the situation in Serbia and how they should respond to it. The two agreed that they needed more arms from the Germans for the Chetniks and the SDS to fight the partisans, and were able to convince Generalfeldmarschall Maximilian von Weichs, the German commander-in-chief of southeastern Europe, to try to provide them with more weapons. They ultimately got very little additional equipment. In late August 1944, the partisans began an offensive against the Germans and the anti-communist Serbian forces, and the Allies began dropping supplies into Serbia. They also bombed communications lines, in an attempt to make it impossible for the German forces in Greece to link up with those in Serbia. The Chetniks were forced out of the country by late September, and Soviet operations began in early October in the east. German forces and Serbian SDS troops were forced to withdraw under the pressure of multiple attacks.

=== After the war ===
Belgrade was liberated by partisans and Soviet forces in the Belgrade Offensive, which was finished on 20 October 1944. Nedić and what remained of his government fled the country in the first week of October to Austria, dissolving the regime. The command of the SDS was transferred to General Damjanović, who gave command of it to Mihailović, although they were separated in January 1945 in Bosnia. He and the other collaborators were handed over by the British to the Yugoslav communist authorities in early 1946. In early February of that year, it was reported that Nedić committed suicide by falling out of a window at a Belgrade hospital.

== Serbian State Guard ==
The Government of National Salvation founded a collaborationist paramilitary force, the Serbian State Guard. It was formed from the former Yugoslav gendarmerie regiments, was created with the approval of the German military authorities. Nedić initially had control over it as the commander-in-chief, but from 1942 the Higher SS and Police Leader took command. The SDS was also known as the Nedićevci after Milan Nedić, the prime minister of the Government of National Salvation, who eventually gained control of its operations. The Serbian State Guard initially numbered 13,400 men. The Guard was divided into three sections: the urban police, the rural area forces, and the frontier guard. In late 1943, the Guard numbered 36,716 men.

In October 1944, as the Red Army closed on Belgrade, the SDS was transferred to Mihailović's control by a member of the fleeing Nedić administration, at which point it fled north and briefly fought under German command in Slovenia before being captured by the British near the Italian-Yugoslav border in May 1945.

The SDS was equipped using arms and ammunition captured by the Germans from throughout Europe, and was organised as a largely static force split across five regions: Belgrade, Kraljevo, Niš, Valjevo and Zaječar, with one battalion per region. Each region was further divided into three districts, each of which included one or more SDS companies. An independent force known as the Banat State Guard operated in the Banat region, which numbered less than one thousand men.

=== Auxiliary formations ===
In addition to the State Guard, a number of other formations fought in Serbia alongside the Germans. Those included the Serbian Volunteer Corps, formed in September 1941 by as the Serbian Volunteer Detachments, under Dimitrije Ljotić, a member of the fascist Yugoslav National Movement. The organization was divided into nineteen detachments, and after being renamed the Serbian Volunteer Corps, received a new structure that included companies, battalions, and regiments. It consisted of about 12,000 members, and included about 150 Croats. It was the only Serbian collaborationist formation trusted by the Germans, and was praised by German commanders for its valor in action.

There was also a group of Chetniks, the Pećanac Chetniks, that became "legalized" and fought for the Germans and the puppet government until being disarmed in 1943. A force of White Russian volunteers was also formed, the Russian Protective Corps. It consisted of White émigrés living in Serbia that wanted to fight against the communist partisans, and included about 300 Soviet prisoners of war. By August 1944, SDS units were responding to Mihailović's call for a general mobilisation by defecting openly to his Chetniks. The SDS was then renamed the "Serbian Shock Corps (Srpski udarni korpus or SUK) of the Yugoslav Army in the Homeland" once again under the command of Radovanović and it joined the withdrawal of other Chetnik formations towards the Sandžak region then into northeastern Bosnia. In the last days of December 1944, the SUK participated, along with other Chetnik formations, in an unsuccessful attempt to capture the Partisan-held city of Tuzla in northeastern Bosnia. This failure and mutual recriminations between Mihailović's Chetniks and the SUK resulted in the effective disintegration of the SUK. By mid-January 1945, 5,000 former SDS members had rejoined the Germans, with some returning to Serbia to take advantage of Josip Broz Tito's amnesty. Most were transported to Austria where they were used in labour battalions under the direction of Organisation Todt, but about 1,500 were allowed to move to the Ljubljana Gap area, where they could join other collaborationist forces, such as the SDK or the Chetnik formations of Momčilo Đujić or Dobroslav Jevđević. Mihailović was not concerned about their departure, describing the former SDS troops as the "worst troops in the world". On the fifth of may the remaining remnants crossed the river Soča and surrendered to the British Army near the Italian-Yugoslav border. Fortunately for them, they were interned as prisoners of war and other than a few senior officers, were not repatriated to Yugoslavia to face trial.

== Administrative divisions ==
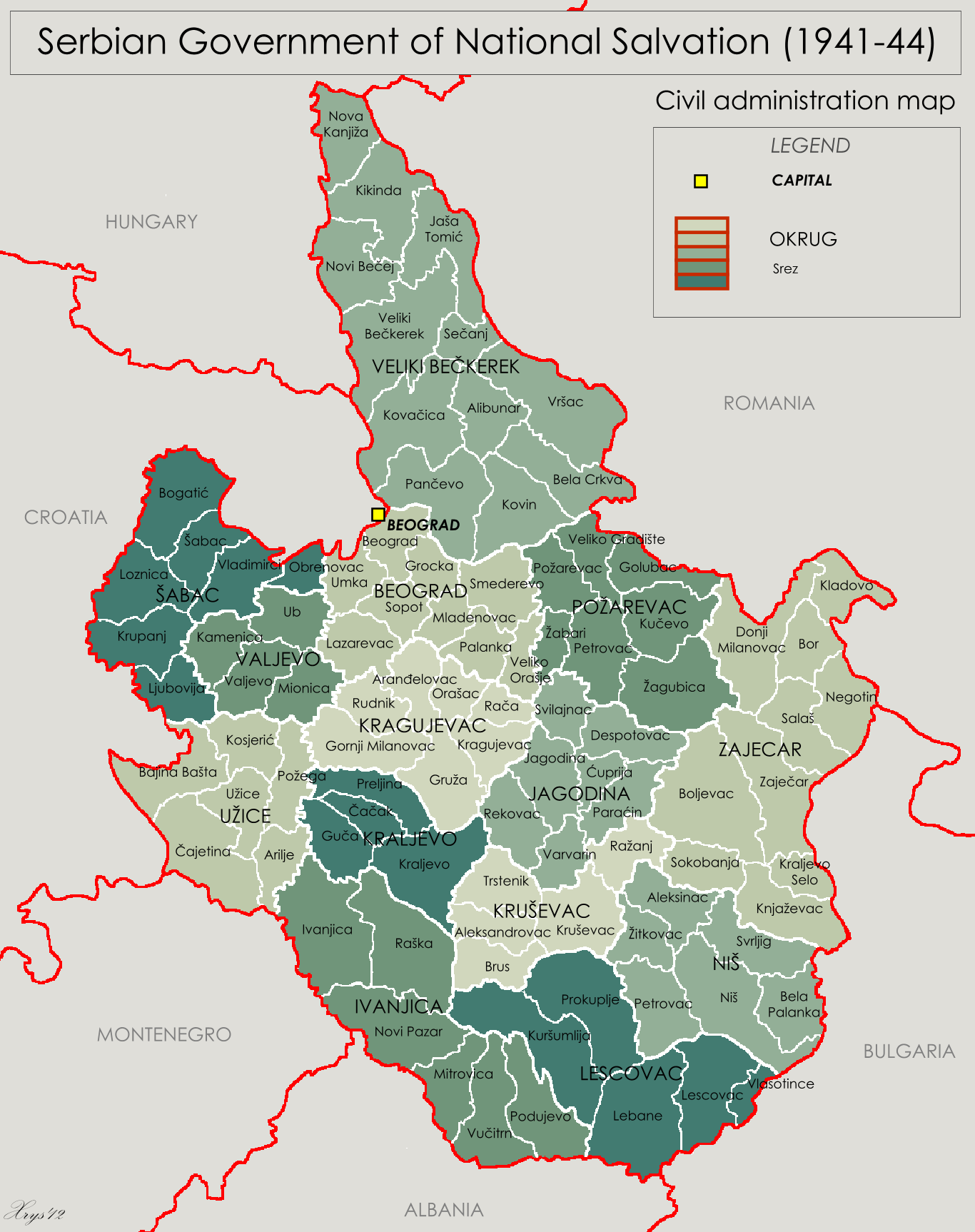
Administrative subdivisions instituted by the Government of National Salvation

Serbia's borders initially incorporated parts of the territory of five of the prewar banovinas. In October 1941, the Germans ordered the Nedić government to reorganise the territory, as the existing structure was not suitable and did not meet military requirements. By means of an order issued on 4 December 1941, the German military commander adjusted the military-administrative structure to conform to German requirements. As a result, the district (Serbian: okrug) subdivision (which had existed in the Kingdom of the Serbs, Croats and Slovenes prior to the formation of the banovinas) was restored. The Nedić government issued a decree on 23 December 1941 by which Serbia was divided into 14 districts (Serbian: okruzi) and 101 municipalities (Serbian: srezovi). The District of Veliki Bečkerek (also known as The Banat) was theoretically part of Serbia, but became an autonomous district, run by the members of local ethnic German population. On 27 December 1941, the heads of the districts were appointed and met with Milan Nedić, Milan Aćimović, Tanasije Dinić, and Cvetan Đorđević.

County	Districts
Belgrade County	Belgrade, Grocka, Lazarevac, Mladenovac, Palanka, Smederevo, Sopot, Umka, Veliko Orašje
Ivanjica County	Istok, Ivanjica, Podujevo, Mitrovica, Novi Pazar, Raška, Srbica, Vučitrn
Kragujevac County	Aranđelovac, Gornji Milanovac, Gruža, Kragujevac, Orašac, Rača, Rudnik
Kraljevo County	Čačak, Guča, Kraljevo, Preljina
Kruševac County	Aleksandrovac, Brus, Kruševac, Ražanj, Trstenik
Jagodina County	Ćuprija, Despotovac, Jagodina, Paraćin, Rekovac, Svilajnac, Varvarin
Leskovac County	Kuršumlija, Lebane, Leskovac, Prokuplje, Vladičin Han, Vlasotince
Niš County	Aleksinac, Bela Palanka, Lužnica, Niš, Petrovac, Svrljig, Žitkovac
Požarevac County	Golubac, Kučevo, Petrovac, Požarevac, Veliko Gradište, Žabari, Žagubica
Šabac County	Bogatić, Krupanj, Ljubovija, Loznica, Obrenovac, Šabac, Vladimirci
Užice County	Arilje, Bajina Bašta, Čajetina, Kosjerić, Požega, Užice
Valjevo County	Kamenica, Mionica, Valjevo, Ub
Veliki Bečkerek County	Alibunar, Bela Crkva, Jaša Tomić, Kikinda, Kovačica, Kovin, Nova Kanjiža, Novi Bečej, Pančevo, Sečanj, Veliki Bečkerek, Vršac
Zaječar County	Boljevac, Bor, Brza Palanka, Donji Milanovac, Kladovo, Knjaževac, Kraljevo Selo, Negotin, Salaš, Sokobanja, Zaječar

== Racial persecution ==
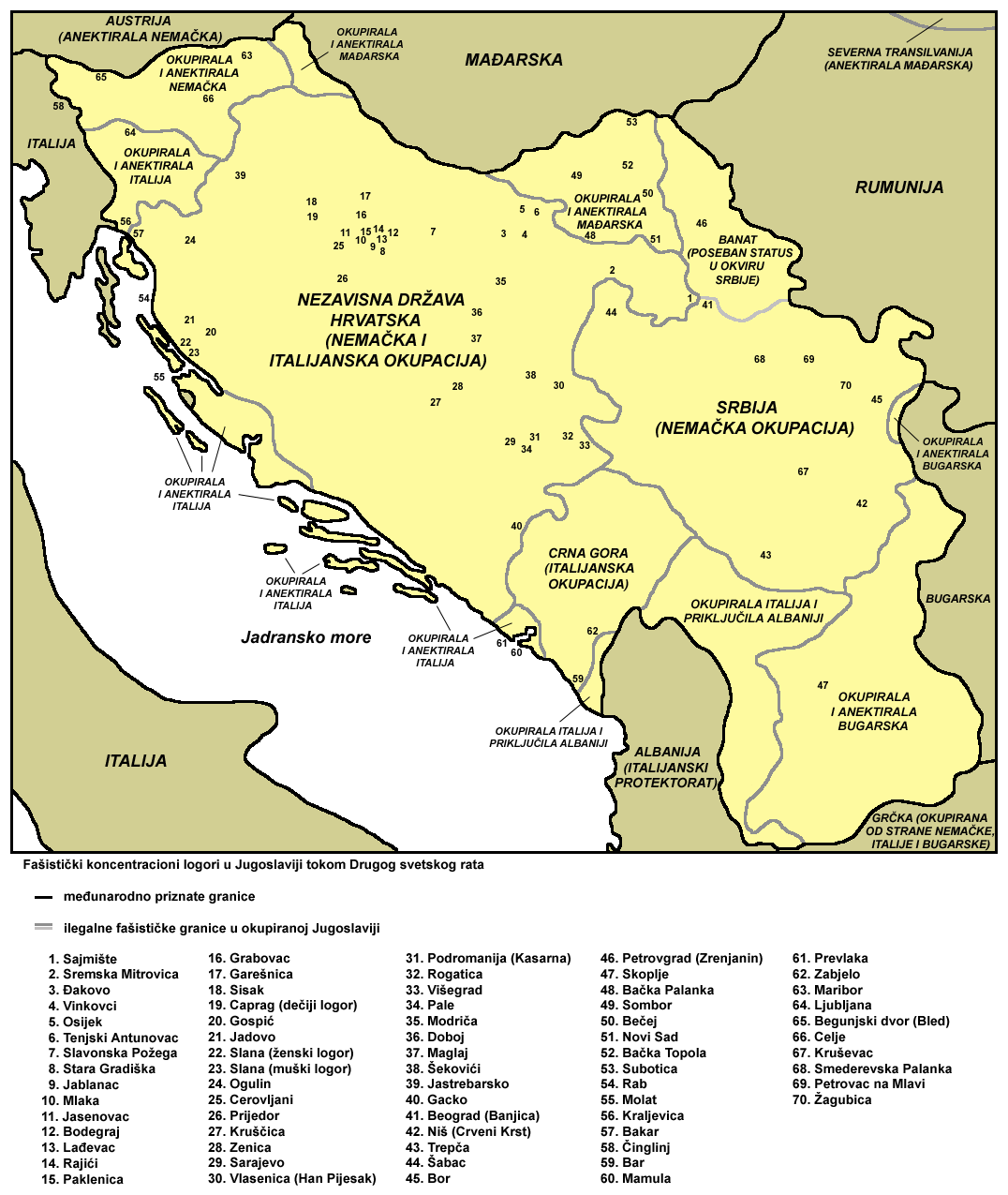
Axis concentration camps in Yugoslavia during World War II

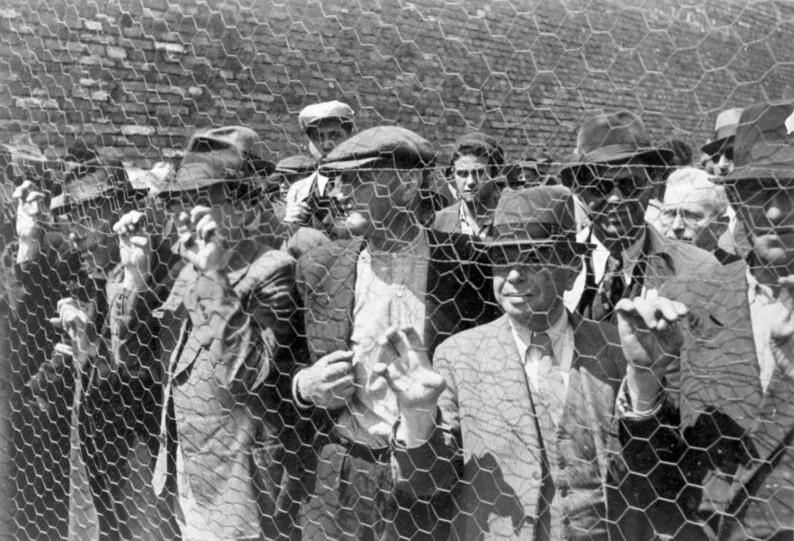
Jews detained in Belgrade, April 1941

Racial laws were introduced in all occupied territories with immediate effects on Jews and Roma people, as well as causing the imprisonment of those opposed to Nazism. Several concentration camps were formed in Serbia and at the 1942 Anti-Freemason Exhibition in Belgrade the city was pronounced to be free of Jews. On 1 April 1942, a Serbian Gestapo was formed. An estimated 120,000 people were interned in Nazi-run concentration camps in the occupied territory between 1941 and 1944. 50,000 to 80,000 were killed during this period. The Banjica Concentration Camp was jointly run by the German Army and Nedic's regime. Serbia became the second country in Europe, following Estonia, to be proclaimed free of Jews. Approximately 14,500 Serbian Jews – 90 percent of Serbia's Jewish population of 16,000 – were murdered in World War II.

Collaborationist armed formations forces were involved, either directly or indirectly, in the mass killings of Jews, Roma and those Serbs who sided with any anti-German resistance or were suspects of being a member of such. These forces were also responsible for the killings of many Croats and Muslims; some Croats who took refuge in the occupied territory were not discriminated against. After the war, the Serbian involvement in many of these events and the issue of Serbian collaboration were subject to historical revisionism by Serbian leaders.

The following were the concentration camps established in the occupied territory:

- Banjica concentration camp (Belgrade)
- Crveni krst concentration camp (Niš)
- Topovske Šupe concentration camp (Belgrade)
- Šabac concentration camp

== List of ministers ==
President of the Council of Ministers

#	Portrait	Name (Born–Died)	Term of Office		Notes
1		Milan Nedić (1878–1946)	29 August 1941	4 October 1944	After the war, he was captured and died after falling out of a window at a Belgrade hospital.

Minister of Internal Affairs

#	Portrait	Name (Born–Died)	Term of Office		Notes
1		Milan Aćimović (1898–1945)	29 August 1941	10 November 1942	He was killed by Yugoslav Partisans in May 1945.
2		Tanasije Dinić (1891–1946)	10 November 1942	5 November 1943	He was captured by Yugoslav authorities after the war and executed.
3		Milan Nedić (1878–1946)	5 November 1943	4 October 1944	He was the president of the council and interior minister concurrently from November 1943.

Minister of Construction

#	Portrait	Name (Born–Died)	Term of Office		Notes
1		Ognjen Kuzmanović (1895–1967)	29 August 1941	4 October 1944	After the Government's fall he went to Germany until his death.

Minister of Postal and Telegraph Affairs

#	Portrait	Name (Born–Died)	Term of Office		Notes
1		Josif Kostić (1877–1960)	29 August 1941	4 October 1944	Survived the war and died in Switzerland in 1960.

Minister of the Presidency Council

#	Portrait	Name (Born–Died)	Term of Office		Notes
1		Momčilo Janković (1883–1944)	29 August 1941	5 October 1941	Left the government after disagreements with other ministers, executed by partisans in 1944.

Minister of Education

#	Portrait	Name (Born–Died)	Term of Office		Notes
1		Miloš Trivunac (1876–1944)	29 August 1941	7 October 1941	Executed by partisans in 1944.
2		Velibor Jonić (1892–1946)	7 October 1941	4 October 1944	He was captured by Yugoslav authorities after the war and executed.

Minister of Finance

#	Portrait	Name (Born–Died)	Term of Office		Notes
1		Dušan Letica (1884–1945)	29 August 1941	26 October 1943	Left the government in 1943 and was captured in Hamburg by the Soviets and extradited to Yugoslavia in July 1945. He was executed after the war.
2		Ljubiša M. Bojić (1912–1980)	26 October 1943	22 February 1944	Soon Left the government in 1944 and was executed by the Yugoslav communist in the summer of 1980.
3		Dušan Đorđević (1880–1969)	22 February 1944	4 October 1944	Survived the war and died in Austria in 1969.

Minister of Labor

#	Portrait	Name (Born–Died)	Term of Office		Notes
1		Panta Draškić (1881–1957)	29 August 1941	10 November 1942	Served in prison after the war in Yugoslavia, and holds the distinction of being the only member of the Nedić regime that remained in the country that did not get executed.

Minister of Justice

#	Portrait	Name (Born–Died)	Term of Office		Notes
1		Čedomir Marjanović (1906–1945)	29 August 1941	10 November 1942	he was captured by Americans in Vienna Austria and was handed over to the Yugoslav authorities and was executed after the war.
2		Bogoljub Kujundžić (1887–1949)	10 November 1942	4 October 1944	Survived the war and died in 1949.

Minister of Social policy and People's Health

#	Portrait	Name (Born–Died)	Term of Office		Notes
1		Jovan Mijušković (1886–1944)	29 August 1941	26 October 1943	He was captured by Yugoslav partisans and executed in 1944.
2		Stojimir Dobrosavljević	26 October 1943	6 November 1943	Left the government in 1943 and was executed after the war.
3		Tanasije Dinić (1891–1946)	6 November 1943	4 October 1944	He was captured by Yugoslav authorities after the war and executed by Yugoslav authorities.

Minister of Agriculture

#	Portrait	Name (Born–Died)	Term of Office		Notes
1		Miloš Radosavljević (1889–1969)	29 August 1941	10 November 1942	Escaped Belgrade and survived the war and died in Bulgaria in 1969.
2		Radosav Veselinović (1904–1945)	10 November 1942	4 October 1944	Captured after the war and was executed.

Minister of People's Economy

#	Portrait	Name (Born–Died)	Term of Office		Notes
1		Mihailo Olćan (1894–1961)	29 August 1941	11 October 1942	Escaped after the war and died in Australia in 1961.
2		Milorad Nedeljković (1883–1961)	10 November 1942	4 October 1944	Escaped after the war and died in France in 1961.

Minister of Transportation

#	Portrait	Name (Born–Died)	Term of Office		Notes
1		Đura Dokić (1873–1946)	7 October 1941	10 November 1942	Captured after the war and was executed.

== Education ==
Under minister Velibor Jonić, the government abandoned the eight-year elementary school system adopted in the Kingdom of Yugoslavia and moved to a four-year program. A new curriculum was introduced:

Subject	I Grade	II Grade	III Grade	IV Grade
Religious education	1	1	2	2
Serbian	11	11	7	7
Fatherland and history	-	-	4	6
Nature	-	-	5	5
Math and geometry	5	5	4	4
Singing	1	1	2	2
Physical education	2	2	2	2
Total hours	20	20	26	28

== See also ==
- Republic of Užice

== Sources ==
=== Books ===
- Benz, Wolfgang (1999). The Holocaust: A German Historian Examines the Genocide. New York: Columbia University Press. ISBN 978-0-231-11215-4.
- Bond, Brian; Roy, Ian (1977). War and society: a yearbook of military history, Volume 2. Taylor & Francis. ISBN 978-0-85664-404-7.
- Borković, Milan (1979). Kvinsliška uprava u Srbiji 1941—1944 (knjiga 1). Belgrade.
- Byford, Jovan (2012). "Willing Bystanders: Dimitrije Ljotić, "Shield Collaboration" and the Destruction of Serbia's Jews". In Haynes, Rebecca; Rady, Martyn (eds.). In the Shadow of Hitler: Personalities of the Right in Central and Eastern Europe. London: I.B.Tauris. ISBN 978-1-84511-697-2.
- Cohen, Philip J. (1996). Serbia's Secret War: Propaganda and the Deceit of History. College Station: Texas A&M University Press. ISBN 978-0-89096-760-7.
- Cox, John (2002). The History of Serbia. The Greenwood Histories of the Modern Nations. Westport: Greenwood Publishing Group. ISBN 978-0-313-31290-8.
- Deroc, Milan (1988). British Special Operations explored: Yugoslavia in turmoil, 1941-1943, and the British response Volume 242 of East European monographs. East European Monographs, University of Michigan. ISBN 978-0-88033-139-5.
- Gutman, Israel (1995). Encyclopedia of the Holocaust. Vol. 2. New York: Macmillan Publishing. ISBN 9780028645278.
- Boško N. Kostić, Za istoriju naših dana, Lille, France, 1949
- Manoschek, Walter (1995). "Serbien ist judenfrei": Militarische Besatzungspolitik und Judenvernichtung in Serbien 1941/42 (in German) (2nd ed.). Munich: Oldenbourg Verlag. ISBN 9783486561371.
- Olivera Milosavljević, Potisnuta istina - Kolaboracija u Srbiji 1941–1944, Beograd, 2006
- Pavlowitch, Stevan K. (2008). Hitler's New Disorder: The Second World War in Yugoslavia. New York: Columbia University Press. ISBN 978-1-85065-895-5.
- Petranović, Branko (1992). Srbija u Drugom svetskom ratu 1939—1945. Belgrade: Vojnoizdavački i novinski centar.
- Ramet, Sabrina P.; Lazić, Sladjana (2011), "The Collaborationist Regime of Milan Nedić", in Ramet, Sabrina P.; Listhaug, Ola (eds.), Serbia and the Serbs in World War Two, London: Palgrave Macmillan, pp. 17–43, ISBN 978-0-23027-830-1
- Tasovac, Ivo (1999). American Foreign Policy and Yugoslavia, 1939–1941. College Station, Texas: Texas A&M University Press. ISBN 978-0-89096-897-0.
- Thomas, Nigel; Mikulan, Krunoslav (1995). Axis Forces in Yugoslavia 1941–45. New York: Osprey Publishing. ISBN 978-1-85532-473-2.
- Tomasevich, Jozo (1975). War and Revolution in Yugoslavia, 1941–1945: The Chetniks. Stanford: Stanford University Press. ISBN 978-0-8047-0857-9.
- Tomasevich, Jozo (2001). War and Revolution in Yugoslavia, 1941-1945: Occupation and Collaboration. Vol. 2. San Francisco: Stanford University Press. ISBN 0-8047-3615-4.
- Udovički, Jasminka; Ridgeway, James (1997). Burn This House: The Making and Unmaking of Yugoslavia. Duke University Press. ISBN 0-8223-1997-7.
- United Kingdom Naval Intelligence Division (1944). Jugoslavia: History, peoples, and administration. Michigan: University of Michigan.
- Weitz, Eric D. (2009). A Century of Genocide: Utopias of Race and Nation. Princeton, New Jersey: Princeton University Press. ISBN 978-1-40082-550-9.

=== Journals ===
- Brborić, Ivan (2010). "Ministarski savet Milana Nedića decembar 1941 - novembar 1942". Istorija 20. Veka. Vol. 28, no. 3. pp. 169–180.
- Hehn, Paul N. (1971). "Serbia, Croatia and Germany 1941-1945: Civil War and Revolution in the Balkans". Canadian Slavonic Papers. 13 (4). University of Alberta: 344–373. doi:10.1080/00085006.1971.11091249.
- Koljanin, Dragica (2010). "U službi 'Novog poretka' - osnovno školstvo i udžbenici istorije u Srbiji (1941-1944)". Istraživanja. Vol. 21. pp. 395–415.
- Portmann, Michael; Suppan, Arnold (2006). "Serbien und Montenegro im Zweiten Weltkrieg (1941 – 1944/45)". Österreichische Osthefte (in German). 47. Zeitschrift für Mittel-, Ost- und Südosteuropaforschung: 265–296. ISSN 0029-9375.
