= Čedomir Marjanović =

Serbian politician

Minister of Justice of the Government of National Salvation
- In office 29 August 1941 – 10 November 1942
- Preceded by: None
- Succeeded by: Bogoljub Kujundžić

Personal details
- Born: 27 May 1906 Veliko Orašje, Kingdom of Serbia
- Died: 19 September 1945 (aged 39) Belgrade, FS Serbia, DF Yugoslavia
- Cause of death: executed
- Party: Zbor
- Education: University of Belgrade
- Profession: Politician

Čedomir Marjanović (27 May 1906 – 19 September 1945) was a Serbian politician who collaborated with the Axis powers in World War II. He was appointed Minister of Justice of the Government of National Salvation in 1941, and retained that position until November 1942. After the fall of the government he was captured in Vienna Austria after the war in August 1945 by American forces as he attempted to fled to Italy and handed over to the Yugoslav partisans and was executed together with Dušan Letica, Radoslav Veselinović, Stojimir Dobrosavljević, Budimir Cvijanović and two Croatian generals Ivan Tomašević, Vladimir Metikoš, and fifteen others collaborators in Nedić's Serbia and the Independent State of Croatia on 19 September 1945, for their war crimes against Jews, Romani, and fighting against the National Liberation Army and collaboration with Germans Italians and Bulgarians and other occupying forces and was linked to Zbor after the invasion of Yugoslavia that April, he was one of the closest associates of Dimitrije Ljotić.
