= Miloš Trivunac =

Professor and writer

Minister of Education of the Government of National Salvation
- In office 29 August 1941 – 7 October 1941
- Preceded by: None
- Succeeded by: Velibor Jonić

Personal details
- Born: 28 July 1876 Belgrade, Principality of Serbia
- Died: 27 November 1944 (aged 68) Belgrade, Kingdom of Yugoslavia
- Education: University of Belgrade
- Profession: Writer, Professor, Politician

Miloš Trivunac (28 July 1876 – 27 November 1944) was a prominent Serbian professor and writer, who, influenced by German literature, published many works in Serbian and German. He was also critical of it in his works.

== Biography ==
Trivunac was born in Aleksinac in 1876, and educated in Niš, Belgrade, Munich, and Leipzig. During the end of the Great War, Trivunac was the president of the Serbian National Defense League of America, founded by Michael Pupin and headquartered at 441 West 22nd Street in New York City. Upon his return to Serbia, he founded the Department of German Language and Literature at the University of Belgrade and was its first professor there. Also, he was one of the founders of the Serbian PEN center in 1926.

In 1941 when Yugoslavia was invaded and occupied by Nazi Germany, Milan Nedić appointed him Minister of Education in the Government of National Salvation in Serbia, but he was removed from that position already on 7 October 1941.

In 1944 he was arrested and executed by Yugoslav Partisans in Belgrade together with Momčilo Janković, Milan Horvatski, Srbislav Dokić, Milan Milovanović, Ranisav Avramović and Jovan Mijušković and 105 other alleged Serbian collaborators.

== Selected works ==
- Aus dem Leben G. Bude's, 1902
- Guillaume Budes De l‘institution du Prince. Ein Beitrag zur Geschichte der Renaissancebewegung in Frankreich, 1903
- Žena u Geteovoj poeziji, 1908
- Geteov Faust, 1921
- Gete, 1931
- Geteova svetska književnost, 1933
- Nemacki uticaj na naš јеzik, 1937
- Geteov Klaviho, 1938

Academic offices
Preceded by Dragoljub Pavlović	Dean of the Faculty of Philosophy; 1927–1928	Succeeded by Milorad Popović
Preceded by Nikola Popović	Dean of the Faculty of Philosophy; 1940–1941	Succeeded by Jovan Tomić
