= Radaković =

Radaković (Cyrillic script: Радаковић) is a Serbian patronymic surname derived from a masculine given name Radak. It may refer to:

- Branko Radaković (born 1982), actor
- Michael Radaković (1866–1934), physicist
- Petar Radaković (1937–1966), footballer
- Borivoj Radaković (born 1951), writer
- Radovan Radaković (born 1971), football goalkeeper
- Uroš Radaković (born 1994), footballer
