= Dobrosavljević =

Dobrosavljević is a surname. People with the surname include:

- Stojimir Dobrosavljević
- Branko Dobrosavljević

== See also ==
- Alin Dobrosavlevici
