= Miloš Radosavljević =

Miloš Radosavljević may refer to:

- Miloš Radosavljević (footballer) (born 1988), Serbian footballer
- Miloš Radosavljević (politician) (1889–1944), Serbian politician
- Miloš Radosavljević (handball coach) (Born in 1983 in Bor, Serbia)
