= Ognjen Kuzmanović =

Serbian politician

Minister of Construction of the Government of National Salvation
- In office 29 August 1941 – 4 October 1944
- Preceded by: None
- Succeeded by: Office abolished

Personal details
- Born: 18 December 1874 Smederevo, Kingdom of Serbia
- Died: 1967 (aged 92–93) Munich, West Germany
- Party: Yugoslav Radical Union (1934–1941)
- Children: 1
- Profession: Politician

Military service
- Allegiance: Kingdom of Serbia
- Branch/service: Royal Serbian Army
- Years of service: 1912–1918
- Battles/wars: Balkan Wars, World War I Serbian Campaign of World War I Salonika front, Battle of Dobro Pole, Ovche Pole Offensive

Ognjen Kuzmanović (18 December 1874 – 1967) was a Serbian politician before and during World War II, who collaborated with the Axis powers during the war.

He fought in the First and Second Balkan Wars. At the outbreak of World War I, he participated in the Serbian Campaign, the Thessalonica front, and fought in the battles of Kolubara, Dobro Pole, and Ovche Pole.

During World War II, he was appointed Minister of Construction of the Government of National Salvation in 1941, and retained that position until the government's collapse in October 1944. He joined the Zbor and became a member after the Invasion of Yugoslavia. He went to Germany after the war and lived there until his death in 1967.
