= Velibor Jonić =

Serbian politician and Axis collaborator

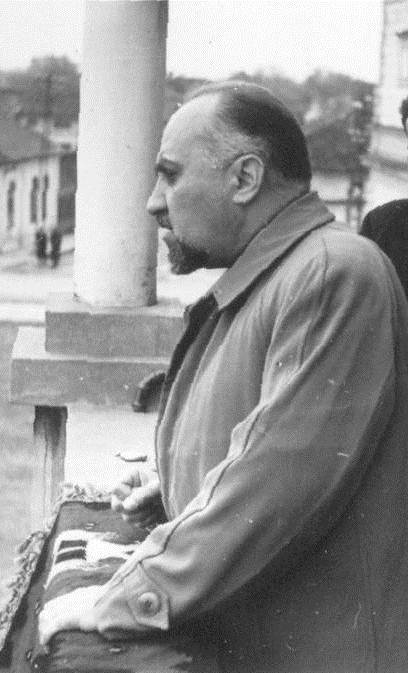

Commissioner of Education of the Commissioner Government
- In office 10 July 1941 – 29 August 1941
- Preceded by: Risto Jojić
- Succeeded by: Miloš Trivunac

Minister of Education of the Government of National Salvation
- In office 7 October 1941 – October 1944
- Prime Minister: Milan Nedić
- Preceded by: Miloš Trivunac
- Succeeded by: Office abolished

Personal details
- Born: 12 February 1892 Krnjevo, Kingdom of Serbia
- Died: 17 July 1946 (aged 54) Belgrade, PR Serbia, FPR Yugoslavia
- Cause of death: Execution by firing squad
- Party: Zbor
- Children: 1
- Profession: Teacher

Velibor Jonić (Serbian Cyrillic: Велибор Јонић; 12 February 1892 – 17 July 1946) was a Serbian fascist politician and government minister in the Territory of the Military Commander in Serbia during World War II. He taught at the Military Academy in Belgrade and at the Yugoslav royal court before the war. He was also the secretary-general of Zbor, a Yugoslav fascist movement. He became the Serbian Commissioner of Education on 10 July 1941. He was tried for collaboration by the communists following the war, was sentenced to death and executed in July 1946.

== Early life ==
Velibor Jonić was born on 12 February 1892 in Krnjevo, Kingdom of Serbia to Krsta and Sofia Jonić (née Veljković). Before World War II, he taught at the Military Academy in Belgrade and worked as a journalist. He was married and had one child. He also worked as a teacher in the royal court.

Jonić joined the Yugoslav National Movement (Zbor) before the war. The Zbor, established in 1935, was presided by right-wing politician Dimitrije Ljotić, who had connections to the royal court and served a short stint as Minister of Justice in 1931. Jonić served as its secretary-general. The party was declared illegal upon establishment, since virtually all political parties in Yugoslavia had been banned since the declaration of King Alexander's dictatorship in 1929. After a petition by Jonić and attorney Milan Aćimović, the Ministry of the Interior eventually conceded and recognized Zbor as an official political party. The organization received German financial aid. It had limited support stemming from the fact that radical right-wing sentiment was not strong amongst the Serbian population, due to associating it with Germany. Being extremely anti-German, the majority of ethnic Serbs rejected fascist and Nazi ideas outright.

== World War II ==
Jonić was appointed Commissioner of Education within the Commissioner Government on 10 July. With his encouragement, 545 prominent Serbs signed the Appeal to the Serbian Nation on 13 August and called for collaboration with Germany. On 29 August, the Germans put Milan Nedić in charge of the Serbian puppet administration. Jonić became Minister of Education on 7 October, having replaced Miloš Trivunac. As Minister of Education, he was given jurisdiction over the Serbian Orthodox Church. He attempted to win the church over to collaboration with the Germans, with little success. He was the chief editor of the weekly Srpski narod (1943–44).

On 28 August 1944, Nedić appointed Jonić to manage the evacuation of the Serbian puppet government to Germany. Jonić suggested that the 5,000 Serbian intellectuals who had expressed support for the German occupation be hidden in Serbian Orthodox monasteries or transferred to Germany along with the government ministers. The Government of National Salvation stopped operating on 3 October, when the Soviet Red Army entered Belgrade and handed power over to the Yugoslav Partisans. Jonić fled Yugoslavia towards the end of the war. He and other exiled members of the Serbian puppet government met with Serbian Patriarch Gavrilo V and Bishop Nikolaj Velimirović in Vienna in December 1944. After the war, Jonić was accused of collaborating with the Germans and was tried in Belgrade together with Draža Mihailović. He was found guilty of collaboration and executed in Belgrade on 17 July 1946.
