= Bogoljub Kujundžić =

Serbian politician (1887–1949)

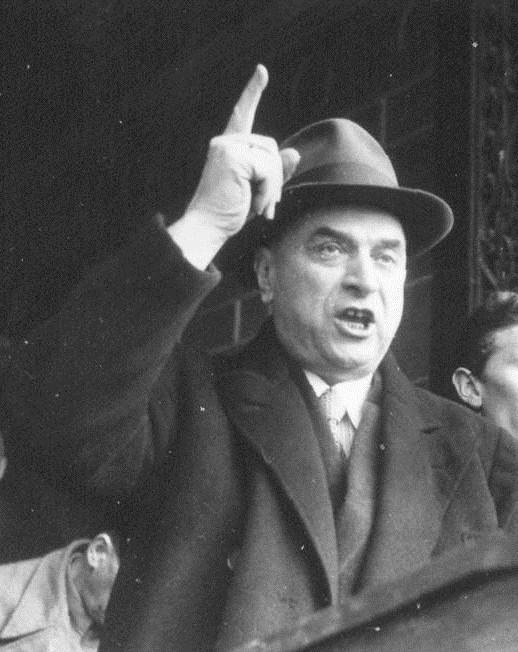

Minister of Justice of Serbian Government of National Salvation
- In office 10 November 1942 – 4 October 1944
- Prime Minister: Milan Nedić
- Preceded by: Čedomir Marjanović
- Succeeded by: Office abolished

Personal details
- Born: Bogoljub Kujundžić; 1887 Livno, Condominium of Bosnia and Herzegovina
- Died: 1949 (aged 61–62) Kitzbühel, Austria
- Occupation: Politician, soldier

Military service
- Allegiance: Kingdom of Serbia; Kingdom of Yugoslavia; Government of National Salvation
- Unit: 18th Regiment
- Battles/wars: World War I

Bogoljub Kujundžić (1887 in Livno, Austria-Hungary – 1949 in Kitzbühel, Austria) was a Serbian politician before and during World War II.

Kujundžić was born to a wealthy Serbian merchant family in Livno (present day Bosnia-Herzegovina), and educated in Karlowitz before going off to study law in Zagreb and Vienna. While studying in Vienna, he was Secretary of the "Zora Society," which was an organization for Serbian students. During World War I he fought for Serbian Kingdom and was wounded. After the First World War, he was active in politics, being first assigned to the Yugoslav embassy in Rome, then being appointed to Minister of Forests and Mines in 1925, before becoming Minister of Education. He collaborated with the Axis powers during the war and became the Minister of Justice in the Government of National Salvation, a collaborationist government set up by Nazi Germany following the invasion of Yugoslavia. He escaped the Soviets and Partisans prior to the liberation and fled to Austria at the end of the war, where he died in 1949.

== Sources ==
- Novi prosvetni minister g. Bogoljub Kujundžić (in Slovenian)
- Serbian Wikipedia
