= Milan Aćimović =

Yugoslav politician and collaborationist with the Axis

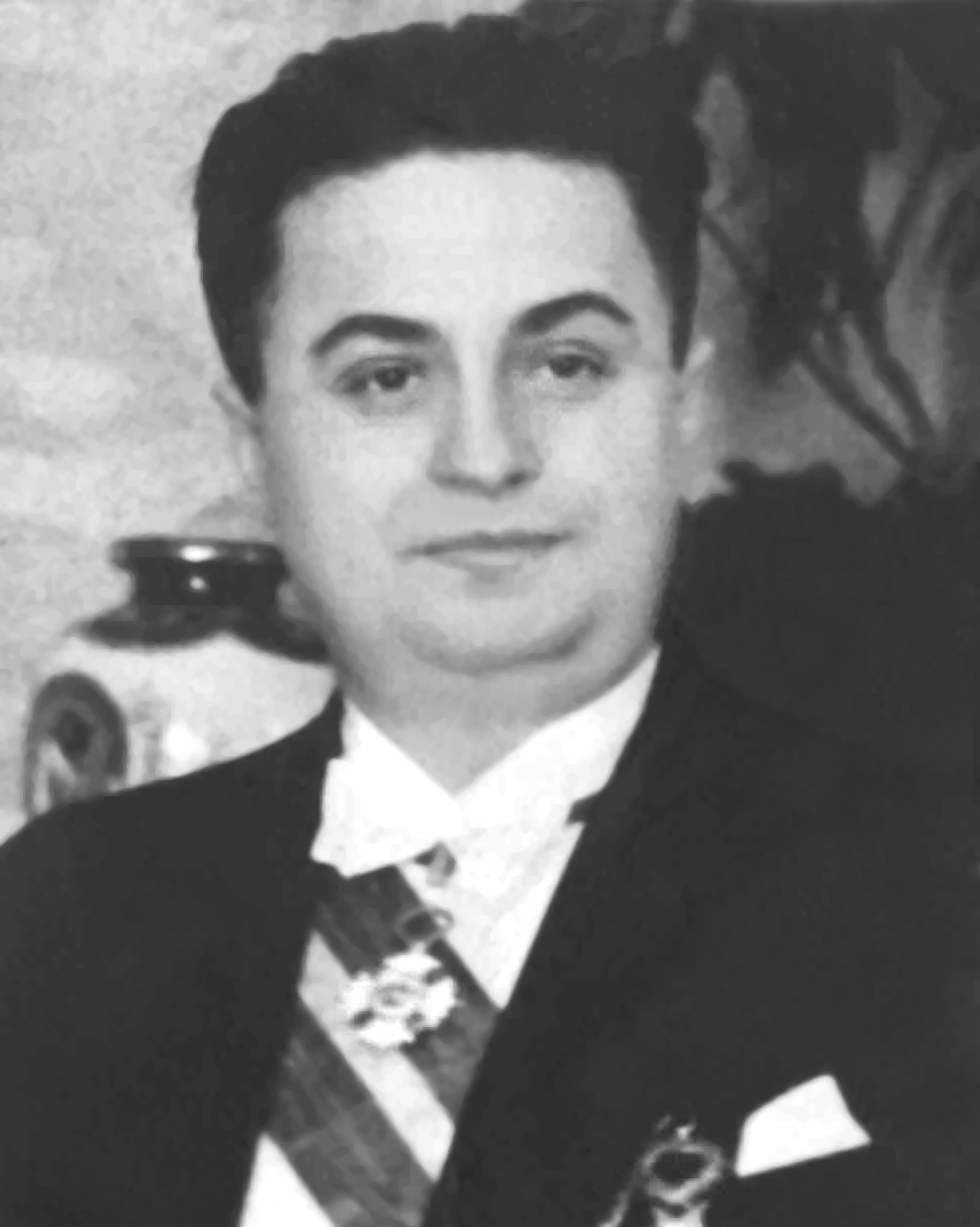

Minister of Internal Affairs of the Government of National Salvation
- In office 29 August 1941 – 10 November 1942
- Preceded by: None
- Succeeded by: Tanasije Dinić

Head of the Council of Commissioners Interior of the Commissioner Government
- In office 30 April 1941 – 29 August 1941
- Preceded by: None
- Succeeded by: Milan Nedić as Prime Minister

Personal details
- Born: 30 May 1898 Pinosava, Kingdom of Serbia
- Died: 25 May 1945 (aged 46) Zelengora, Democratic Federal Yugoslavia (now Bosnia and Herzegovina)
- Party: Yugoslav Radical Union
- Profession: Politician

Military service
- Allegiance: Kingdom of Yugoslavia; Government of National Salvation; Nazi Germany; Chetniks

Milan Aćimović (Serbian Cyrillic: Милан Аћимовић; 31 May 1898 – 25 May 1945) was a Yugoslav and Serbian politician and collaborationist with the Axis in Yugoslavia during World War II.

== Early life ==
Milan Aćimović was born on 31 May 1898 in Pinosava, in the Belgrade municipality of Voždovac. He finished gymnasium in Belgrade and received a law degree from the University of Belgrade in 1923. On 2 September 1935, he and Velibor Jonić successfully petitioned the Ministry of Interior to legalize the Yugoslav National Movement (Zbor). He became the chief of police in Belgrade in 1938 and was appointed Minister of Interior by Milan Stojadinović on 21 December 1938. He held this position until 5 February 1939. In April 1939, he was arrested alongside Stojadinović and was detained until August 1940.

== World War II ==
In April 1941, Reinhard Heydrich came to Belgrade and gave instructions to find loyal collaborators among Serbs and to rely on high police officers Milan Aćimović and Dragi Jovanović, with whom Heydrich already worked with. Besides Aćimović and Jovanović, German politics was supported by Dimitrije Ljotić, leader of the organisation Zbor. The Germans preferred Aćimović over Ljotić, as he was a security expert and was not ideologically burdened like Ljotić. The Commissioner Government was formed by the end of April by the decision of Harald Turner and Helmuth Förster with Aćimović as President of Government and Commissioner of Interior. The government did not even have the status of Quisling government, but rather of an auxiliary organisation to the German military administration of the Military Commander in Serbia. Aćimović tried to maintain the existing state apparatus, but he had to replace officials who were not Serbs or who had left the country, as well as firing those suspected of being anti-German. On 13 July 1941, he ordered a decree to arrest family members of communists on the run, specifically wives and sons over 16, or if they did not have children, fathers and brothers younger than 60 only if they live together. Aćimović stayed in this position until August 1941, when the government was taken over by Milan Nedić. The Germans who were unhappy with unrest in Serbia realised that the Commissioner Government was unpopular with the people and without any authority. The government was also divided between supporters of Ljotić and former allies of Milan Stojadinović, led by Aćimović himself. The Commissioner Government collapsed after Ljotić withdrew two of his ministers from the government. However, Aćimović entered Nedić's government as minister of interior.

As both head of Commissioner Government and as Minister of Interior in Nedić's government, Aćimović maintained relations with Draža Mihailović's movement. Even though he knew about the Belgrade branch of Mihailović's movement, he did not take any actions against them. In December 1941 he warned Mihailović about the upcoming operation against him. The Germans found out about this contact, which put Nedić in a difficult position. Nedić succeeded in convincing the Germans that he knew nothing and banned Aćimović from meddling in the Mihailović issue. Aćimović was replaced by Tanasije Dinić as Interior Minister on 10 November 1942 because of his connections to the Chetniks, whom the Germans did not yet consider necessary or reliable allies in the fight against the Yugoslav Partisans.

After the expulsion of Germans from Serbia in October 1944, Aćimović became a connection between the German envoy for the Balkans Hermann Neubacher and Mihailović. For that purpose he came to Mihailović's headquarters while he was in Bosnia. He died in the Battle of Zelengora while he was retreating from the Partisans with the Chetniks.
