= Panta Draškić =

Serbian politician (1881–1957)

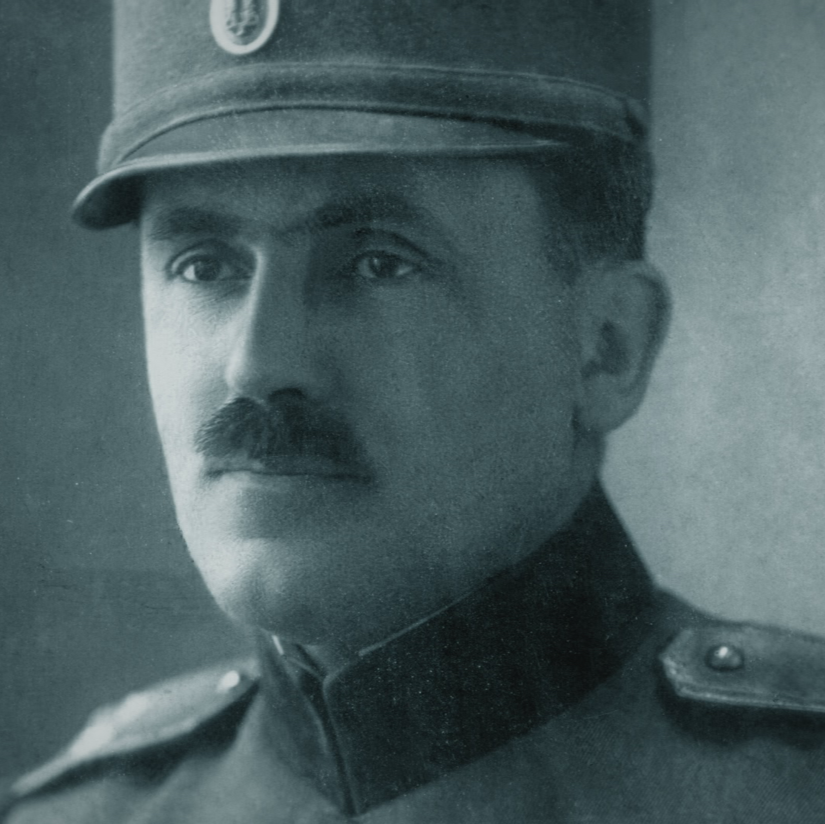
- Draškić in 1918

Minister of Labor of the Government of National Salvation
- In office 29 August 1941 – 10 November 1942
- Preceded by: None

Personal details
- Born: Pantelija Draškić; 30 November 1881 Užice, Principality of Serbia
- Died: 22 August 1957 (aged 75) Belgrade, PR Serbia, FPR Yugoslavia
- Profession: Soldier, politician

Military service
- Allegiance: Kingdom of Serbia (1901–1918); Kingdom of Yugoslavia (1919–1941); Government of National Salvation (1941–1942); Nazi Germany (1941–1942); Chetniks (1943–1945)
- Years of service: 1901–1936, 1943–1945
- Rank: Brigadier General

Pantelija "Panta" Draškić (Serbian Cyrillic: Пантелија Панта Драшкић; 30 November 1881 – 22 August 1957) was a Serbian army general and politician whose career spanned four decades.

== Biography ==
Draškić was born in Užice in 1881, and served in the Balkan Wars and World War I. By the 1930s he was Adjutant to King Alexander I of Yugoslavia.

During World War II he sided with Milan Nedić's Government of National Salvation, which collaborated with Nazi Germany. He encouraged anti-partisan activities and recruited soldiers to fight the communists. In August 1941 he was appointed Minister of Labor for the regime.

In 1943, Draškić joined the Chetniks, and returned to his rank of brigadier general.

During the occupation, he was the only member of Nedić's regime that is known to have aided in the rescue of Jews. He saved a Jewish Colonel, Abraham Beraha, and his wife from persecution by obtaining papers making them exempt from the laws and keeping them safe.

After the collapse of the government and the communist takeover, many Chetniks and former members of the Nedić regime fled with the Germans to Austria, though Draškić did not. He remained in Yugoslavia, and received a prison sentence from the communist authorities. He was the only member of the regime who remained in the country that did not get executed.
