= Tanasije Dinić =

Serbian military officer

- Танасије Динић
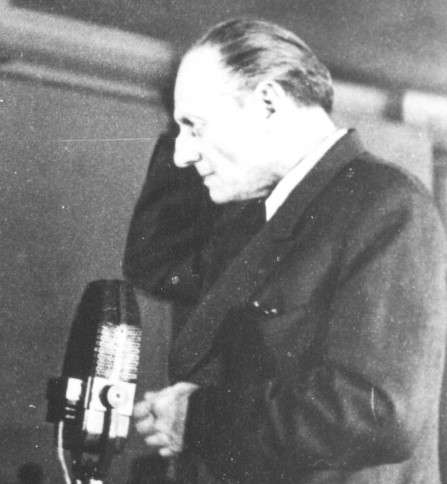

Minister of Interior of the Government of National Salvation
- In office 10 November 1942 – 6 November 1943
- Prime Minister: Milan Nedić
- Preceded by: Milan Aćimović
- Succeeded by: Milan Nedić

Minister of Social Policy and People's Health of the Government of National Salvation
- In office 6 November 1943 – 4 October 1944
- Prime Minister: Milan Nedić
- Preceded by: Stojimir Dobrosavljević
- Succeeded by: Office abolished

Personal details
- Born: Tanasije Dinić; 15 April 1891 Niš, Kingdom of Serbia
- Died: 17 July 1946 (aged 55) Belgrade, PR Serbia, FPR Yugoslavia
- Cause of death: Execution by firing squad
- Party: Yugoslav National Movement
- Occupation: Soldier, politician

Military service
- Allegiance: Kingdom of Serbia (1912–1918); Kingdom of Yugoslavia (1918–1941); Government of National Salvation (1941–1944); Nazi Germany (1941–1945)
- Rank: Colonel

Tanasije Dinić (15 April 1891 – 17 July 1946) was a Serbian military officer and later Minister of Internal Affairs in the collaborationist Government of National Salvation established in the German-occupied occupied territory of Serbia during World War II. Dinić held the rank of lieutenant-colonel in the Royal Yugoslav Army and was a British sympathizer before and during World War II. He became a member of the fascist Yugoslav National Movement in order to report German plans for the Balkans to the British Foreign Office, SOE and MI6. Following the invasion of Yugoslavia, he held the post of minister of interior in Milan Nedić's puppet government. Dinić became the minister of social policy and people's health in 1943, and was later captured by Americans near Vienna after war, interrogated, flown back to Belgrade, and handed over to the new communist government. After a trial and sentencing he was executed by firing squad on 17 July 1946, along with Chetnik leader General Draža Mihailović and a number of other collaborators.

== Sources ==
- Tomasevich, Jozo (2002). War and Revolution in Yugoslavia, 1941-1945: Occupation and Collaboration. Stanford: Stanford University Press. ISBN 978-0-8047-3615-2.
