= Serbian Gestapo =

- Active: 1942–1944
- Country: Nedić regime Nazi Germany
- Allegiance: Nazi Germany
- Branch: Gestapo
- Size: 2,000+ in total went through the unit, 145 members at a given time
- Engagements: Action in Grocka (1942)

Commanders
- Notable commanders: Strahinja Janjić

The Serbian Gestapo (Note: Serbian: Српски Гестапо, Srpski Gestapo) was a special police unit which was established by the German Gestapo in the Territory of the Military Commander in Serbia during World War II.

== History ==
=== Background ===
On 6 April 1941, Axis forces invaded the Kingdom of Yugoslavia. Poorly equipped and poorly trained, the Royal Yugoslav Army was quickly defeated. The country was then dismembered, with Serbia being reduced to its pre-1912 borders and placed under a government of German military occupation. With their forces in the Balkans depleted by the need to send troops to the Eastern Front, the Germans sought to find local leaders to police the region for them. In Serbia this came in the form of Milan Nedić, a pre-war politician who was known to have pro-Axis leanings.

=== Formation ===
The Germans then utilized a series of irregular armed formations to help stabilize the region. One of these formations was the 1st Special Armed detachment "Belgrade", formed in early 1942, which was formed by a former Yugoslav officer Strahinja Janjić.

Captain Strahinja Janjić, a reported German agent and member of the Serbian fascist movement Zbor, was selected by Schäfer to lead the new organization. Janjić proceeded to recruit members of quisling formations such as the Serbian State Guard and the Serbian Volunteer Corps, as well as high school students, merchants and officials from Nedić's administration. Members of the detachment then began calling themselves the Serbian Gestapo (Serbian: Српски Гестапо, romanized: Srpski Gestapo). Meanwhile, Janjić began to see himself as replacing Nedić and becoming the Führer of a national socialist Serbia with the first twelve members of his detachment, whom he called his "apostles", taking the highest state positions. Furthermore, Janjić proposed to Felix Benzler of the Reich Ministry of Foreign Affairs and August Meyszner of the Schutzstaffel (SS) that he should be entrusted with the creation of two Serbian SS divisions, one for the Eastern Front and one for the front in North Africa. When Nedić heard of Janjić's intentions, he ordered his arrest and the disbanding of the 1st Belgrade Special Combat detachment. Janjić was subsequently detained at the Banjica concentration camp, before being released at the behest of the German Gestapo.

After few months, the German Gestapo, without the knowledge of Nedić or his government, tasked Janjić with forming a new unit, which got nicknamed a "Serbian Gestapo". It was the intention of SS-Oberführer Emanuel Schäfer, the newly appointed chief of the German Security Police in Serbia, to create "an indigenous Serbian entity through which the Gestapo could exert more control over the Nedić regime.

=== Operations ===
Between 1942 and 1944, the Serbian Gestapo was active in the Syrmia region of the Independent State of Croatia. At the end of 1942, it was recorded as having 145 members. Headquartered in a reconfigured primary school where torture and murders occurred, it was envisioned by the Germans as being an elite formation which would operate against the Yugoslav Partisans. However, Janjić was more concerned with usurping Nedić than fighting the Communists. On 22 February 1943, Nedić sent a memorandum to Schäfer, protesting the activities of Janjić's detachment.

In December 1942, 30 members of SG under command of Strahinja Janjic launched an action in Grocka with the goal of disarming and arresting one part of the Chetniks who were led by Petar Stojanović. The action went successful as in the middle of December the Serbian Gestapo managed to disarm and capture members of the Stojanović Chetnik group. Some of their members, including Stojanović, were deported to concentration camps where they were killed. The action was one of the first actions executed by the members of the Serbian Gestapo under the command of Strahinja Janjić.

=== Dissolution ===
After receiving the memorandum, Schäfer divided Janjić's unit into two parts. Subsequently, Janjić and twenty-six of his men left Belgrade and travelled to Berlin, where they continued to work for the German Gestapo. Another thirty-three members of the detachment remained in Belgrade under the leadership of Janjić's deputy, Svetozar Nećak. Here, they worked to fulfill specific tasks set out to them by the Germans, and were ordered to undermine the actions of the Partisans rather than Nedić's administration. Headquartered in his Berlin apartment, Janjić had his men infiltrate the ranks of the Yugoslav forced labourers there, using methods such as blackmail, robbery, and entrapment to expose Partisan sympathizers. Despite these efforts, Janjić's actions were seen as being "[harmful] to German interests," and in May 1944 he was replaced by two other members of his detachment. It is reported by new communist authorities that 121 people died as either Gestapo collaborators or as members of Serbian Gestapo after September 12, 1944, during and liberation of Belgrade.

== Uniform ==
Occasionally, members of the detachment wore the uniform of Draža Mihailović's Chetniks. At other times, however, they dressed in German military uniforms.

== Sources ==
=== Books ===
- Cohen, Philip J. (1996). Serbia's Secret War: Propaganda and the Deceit of History. College Station: Texas A&M University Press. ISBN 978-0-89096-760-7.
- Singleton, Fred (1985). A Short History of the Yugoslav Peoples. Cambridge: Cambridge University Press. ISBN 978-0-521-27485-2.
- Radanović, Milan (2016). Kazna I Zločin: Snage kolaboracije u Srbiji. Belgrade: Rosa Luxemburg Stiftung.
- Tomasevich, Jozo (2001). War and Revolution in Yugoslavia, 1941–1945: Occupation and Collaboration. Stanford: Stanford University Press. ISBN 978-0-8047-3615-2.

=== Journals ===
- Hehn, Paul N. (1971). "Serbia, Croatia and Germany 1941–1945: Civil War and Revolution in the Balkans". Canadian Slavonic Papers. 13 (4). University of Alberta: 344–373. doi:10.1080/00085006.1971.11091249. JSTOR 40866373.
