= Jovan Mijušković =

Serbian politician (1886–1944)

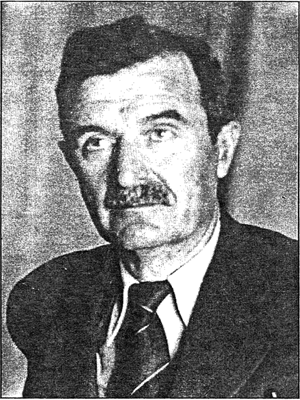

Minister of Social Policy and People's Health in the Government of National Salvation
- In office 29 August 1941 – 26 October 1943
- Preceded by: Office established
- Succeeded by: Stojimir Dobrosavljević

Personal details
- Born: 17 September 1886 Niš, Kingdom of Serbia
- Died: 27 November 1944 (aged 58) Belgrade, Yugoslavia
- Cause of death: Executed
- Party: Yugoslav Radical Union (1934–1941) People's Radical Party (?–1934)
- Children: 1
- Profession: Politician

Jovan Mijušković (Serbian Cyrillic: Јован Мијушковић; 17 September 1886 – 27 November 1944) was a Serbian doctor and Minister of Social Policy and People's Health in the Nazi-controlled Government of National Salvation.

He was executed extrajudicially by Yugoslav Partisans during a series of summary executions upon their taking of power in 1944.
