= Krnjevo =

- Town
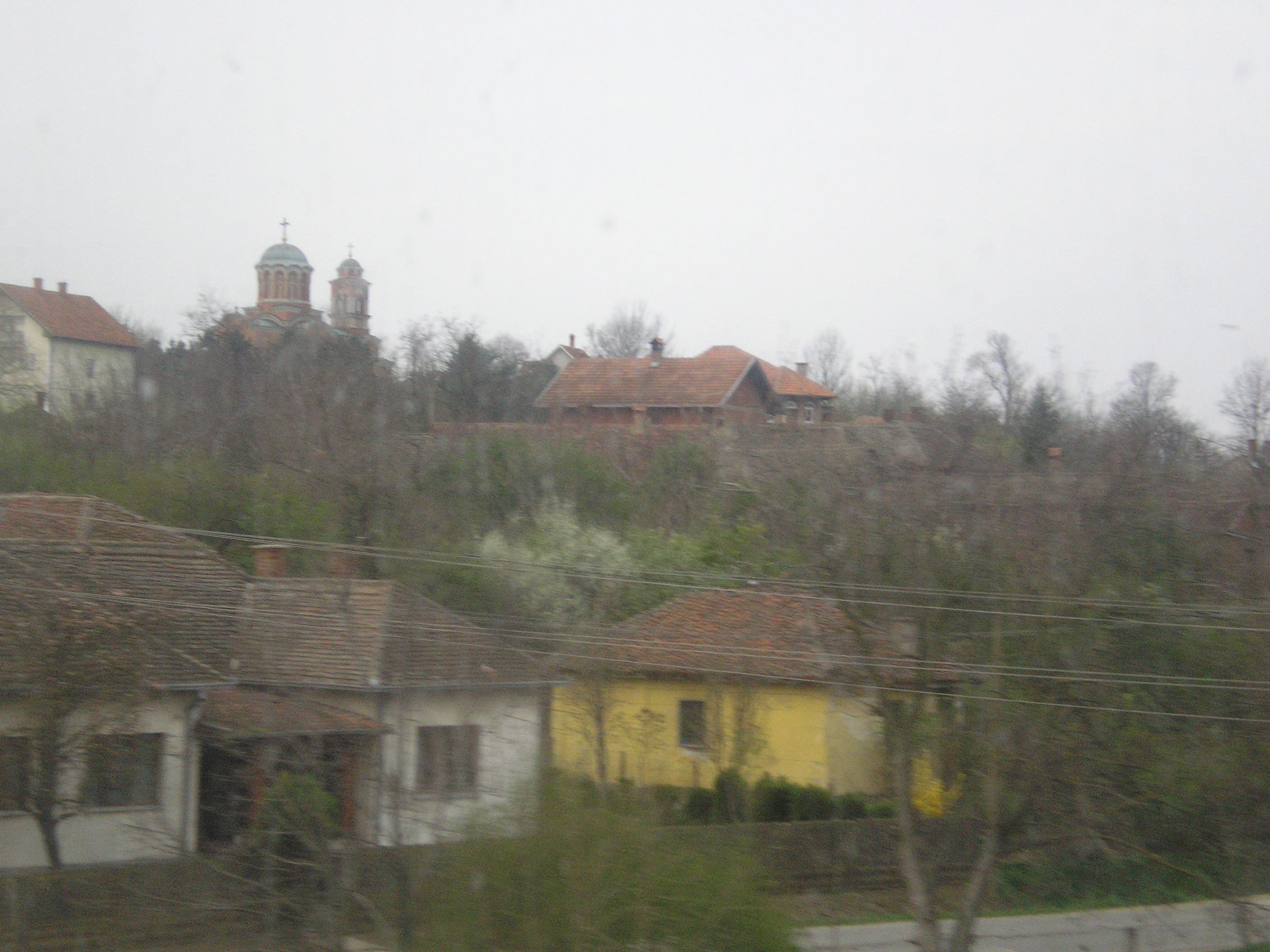

- Location within Serbia
- Coordinates: 44°24′34″N 21°02′49″E
- Country: Serbia
- District: Podunavlje District
- Municipality: Velika Plana

Population (2011)
  - Total: 3,777
- Time zone: UTC+1 (CET)
  - Summer (DST): UTC+2 (CEST)

Krnjevo is a small town in the municipality of Velika Plana, Serbia. By road it is 83 kilometres (52 mi) southeast of the Belgrade. According to the 2002 census, the town has a population of 4,253 people. The area, with its rich black soils, belongs to the Smederevo wine region which also includes Smederevo, Grocka, and Pozarevac.

== Notable people ==
- Velibor Jonić, a member of the fascist movement ZBOR and a Serbian Commissioner of Education during World War II
- Kosta Manojlović (1890–1949), composer
- Aleksandar Tirnanić, Yugoslavian footballer
