= Miloš Radosavljević (politician) =

Serbian politician

Minister of Agriculture of the Government of National Salvation
- In office 29 August 1941 – 10 November 1942
- Preceded by: Office established
- Succeeded by: Radosav Veselinović

Personal details
- Born: May 22, 1889 Svilajnac, Kingdom of Serbia
- Died: 13 September 1944 (aged 65) Serbia
- Party: Democratic Party (Yugoslavia) (1919–1941)
- Profession: Politician

Miloš Radosavljević (22 May 1889 – 13 September 1944) was a Serbian politician who collaborated with the Axis powers during the World War II. He was appointed Minister of Agriculture of the Government of National Salvation in 1941, and retained that position until November 10, 1942. In the report of the Commission for the secret graves of those killed after September 12, 1944, the name of Miloš Radosavljević was listed among those killed during the establishment of the new authorities in 1944. He was one of the member of the Democratic Party (Yugoslavia) was an associate of Ljubomir Davidović the founder of Democratic Party.
