= Momčilo Janković =

Serbian politician

Minister of the Presidency Council of the Government of National Salvation
- In office 29 August 1941 – 5 October 1941
- Preceded by: None
- Succeeded by: Office abolished

Personal details
- Born: 24 November 1883 Niš, Kingdom of Serbia
- Died: 27 November 1944 (aged 61) Belgrade, Yugoslavia
- Cause of death: Executed
- Profession: Politician

Momčilo Janković (Serbian Cyrillic: Момчило Јанковић; 24 November 1883 – 27 November 1944) was a Serbian politician in the Nazi-controlled Government of National Salvation in 1941.

== Career ==
He was elected in 1938 as a deputy of the Yugoslav Radical Union Milan Stojadinović in the December election in 1938. Then he moved to Belgrade where he worked as a lawyer. He was appointed Minister of the Presidency Council in late August 1941, but due to disagreements with other ministers he left the government in early October. During his short tenure as Minister he was one of the signators of Order of Harsh Courts, in which it is prescribed that "everyone who exposes communist or anarchist by words or acts or is a member of such organisation will be punished by death.

== Death and rehabilitation ==
He was sentenced to death by military court of First Proletarian Corps in 1944. In February 2012, he was rehabilitated by the High Court in Belgrade.
