= Kamenica (Valjevo) =

Kamenica Каменица
- Village (Selo)
- Location within Serbia
- Coordinates: 44°20′N 19°43′E
- Country: Serbia
- District: Kolubara District
- Municipality: Valjevo

Population (2002)
  - Total: 1,005
- Time zone: UTC+1 (CET)
  - Summer (DST): UTC+2 (CEST)

Kamenica is a village in the municipality of Valjevo, Serbia. According to the 2002 census, the village has a population of 1005 people.

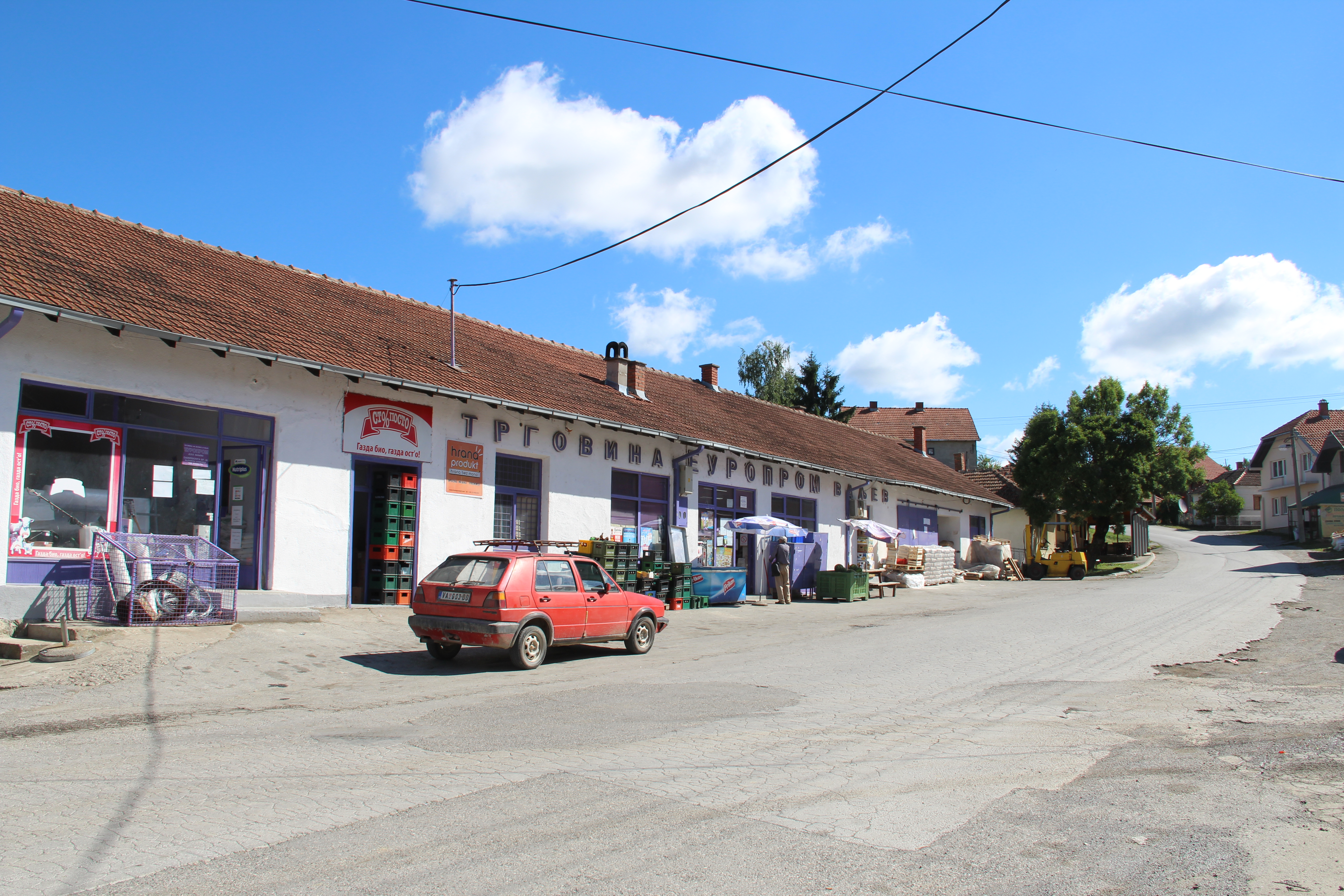
Valjevska Kamenica - Panorama

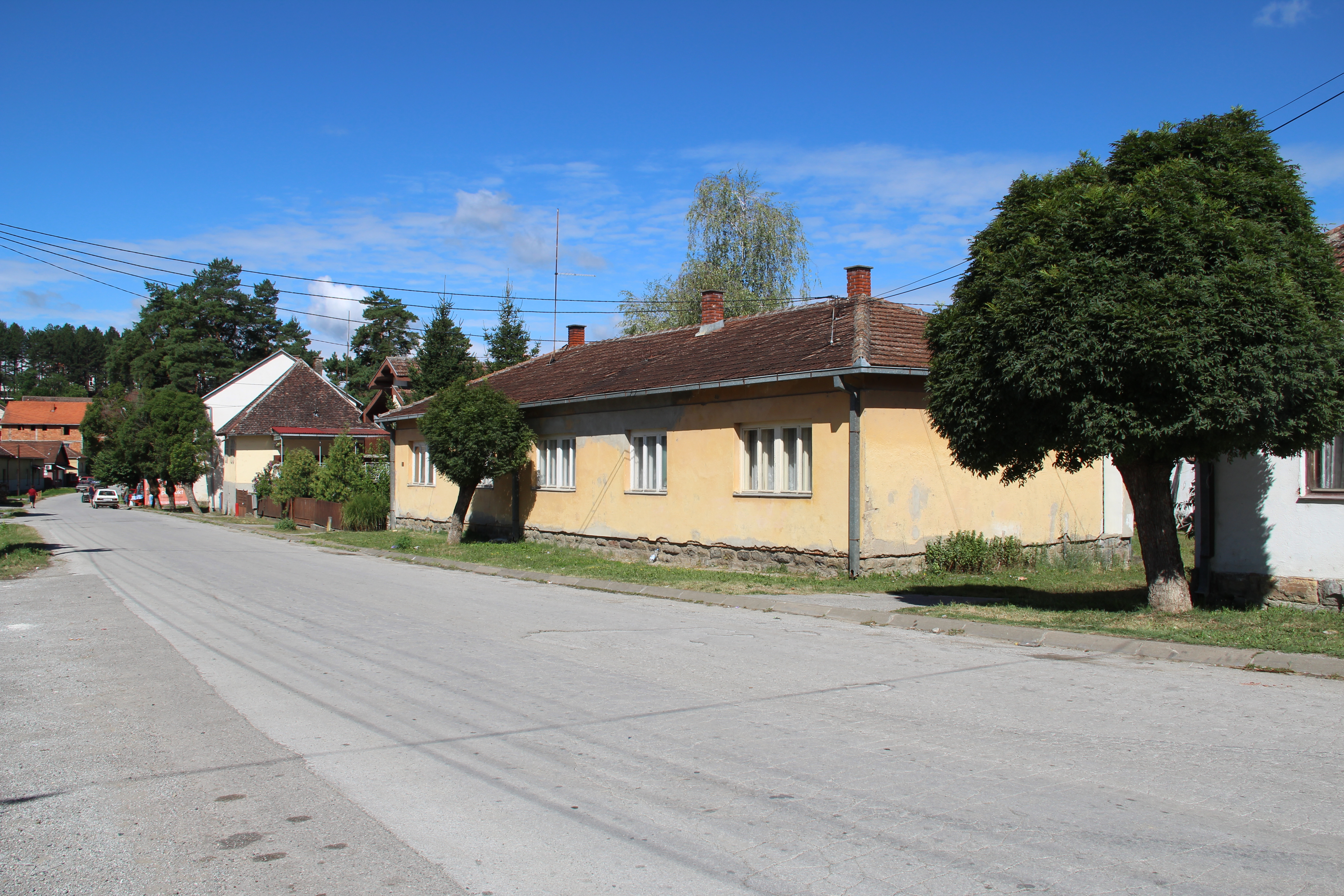
Valjevska Kamenica - Panorama

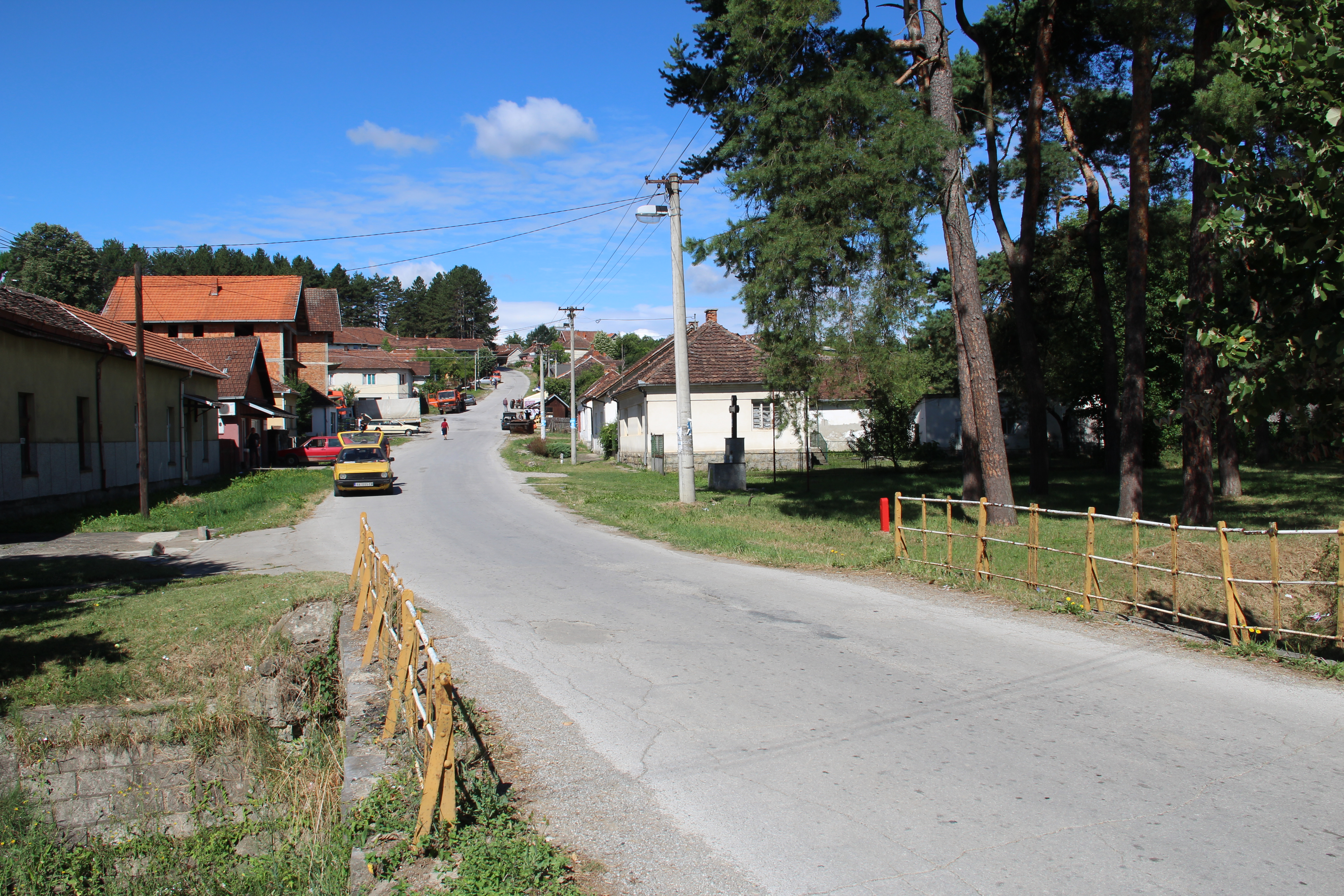
Valjevska Kamenica - Panorama

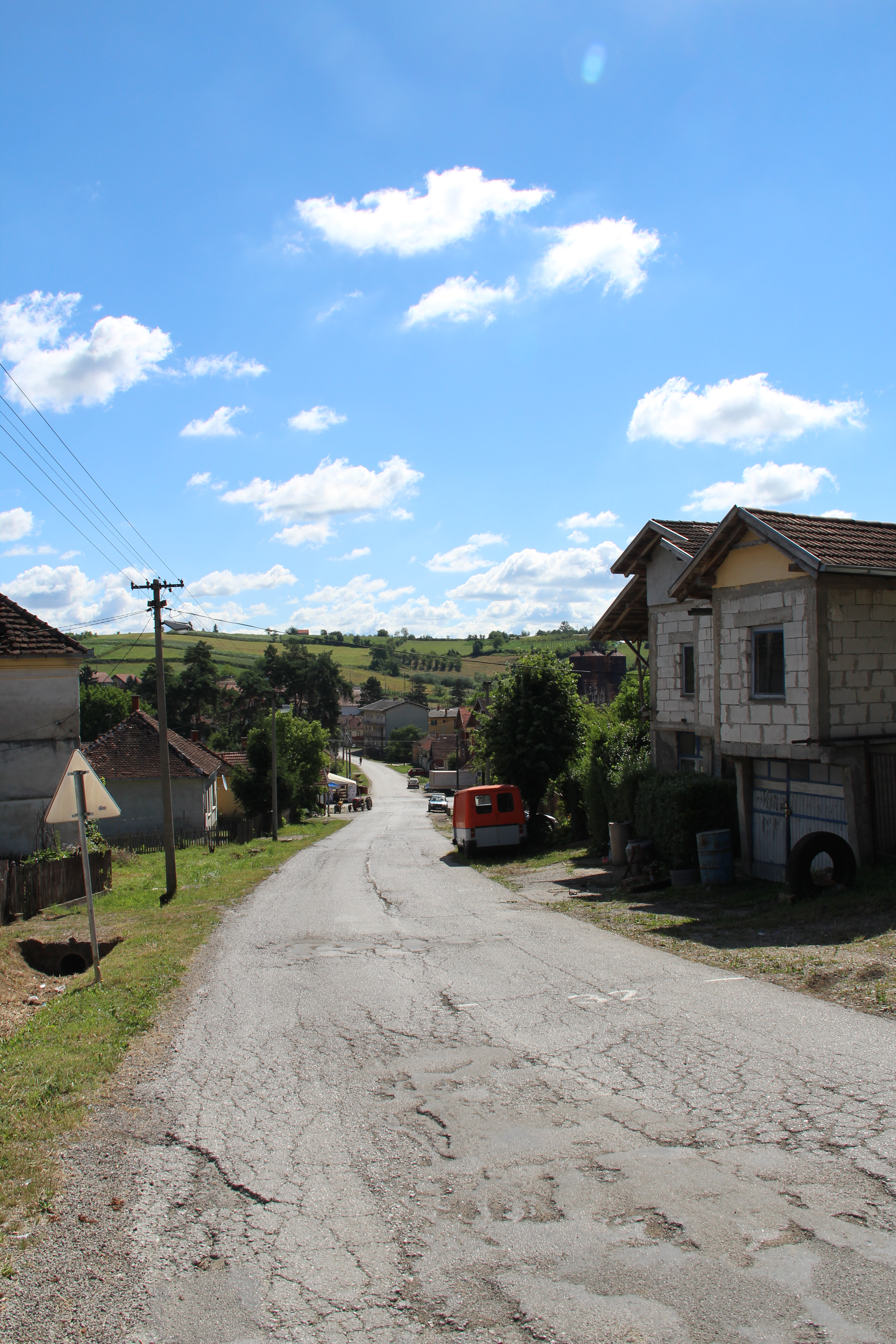
Valjevska Kamenica - Panorama

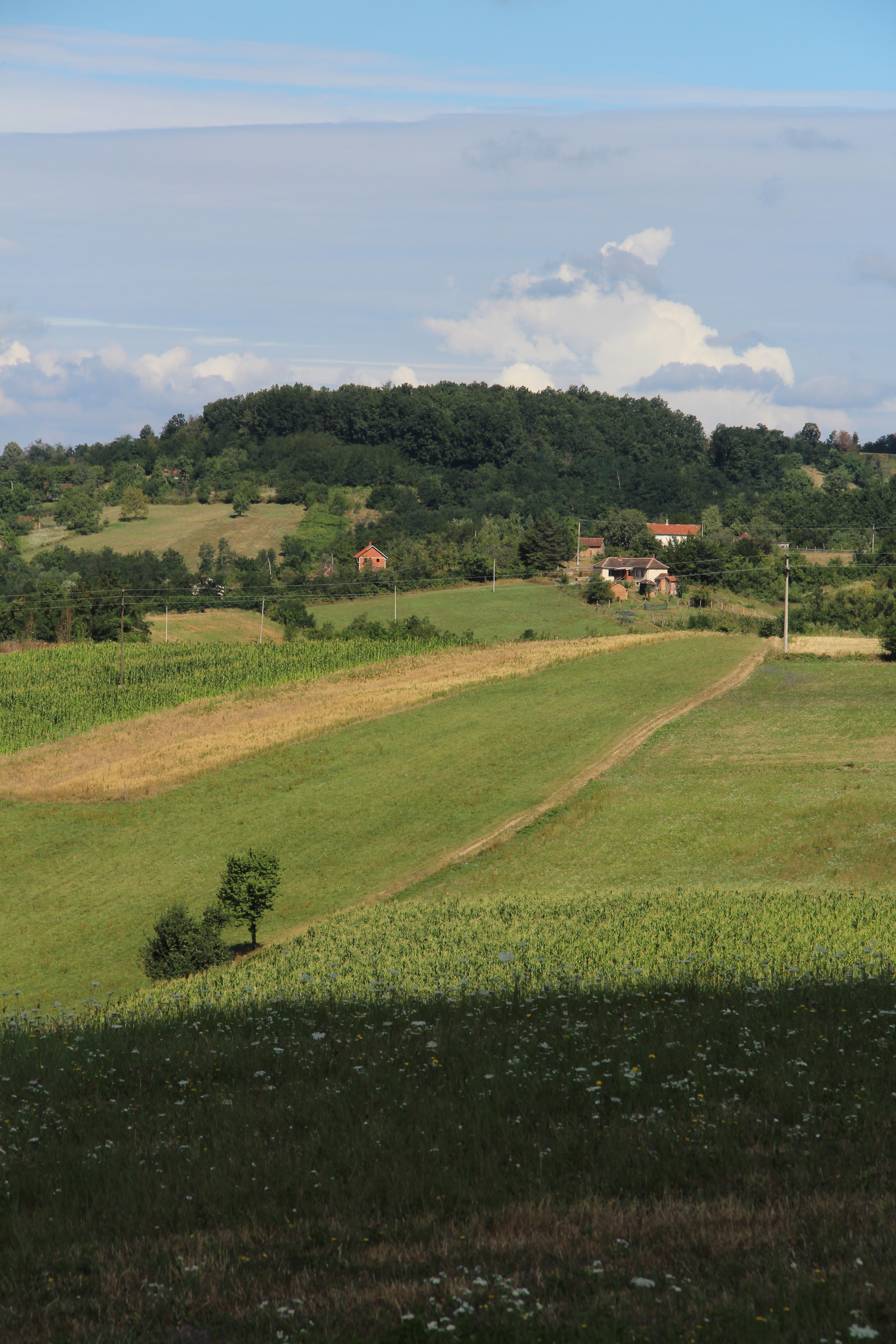
Valjevska Kamenica - Panorama

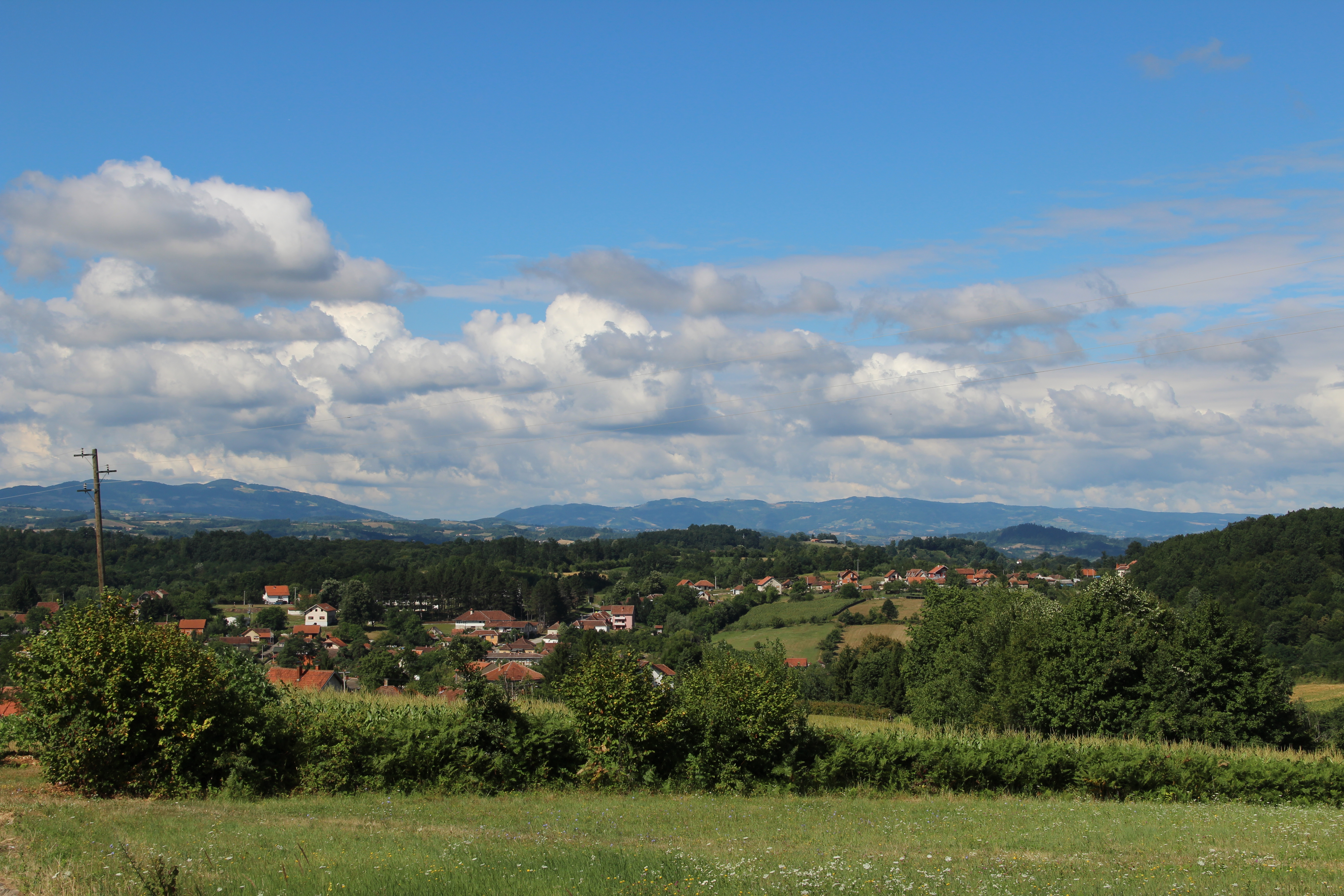
Valjevska Kamenica - Panorama

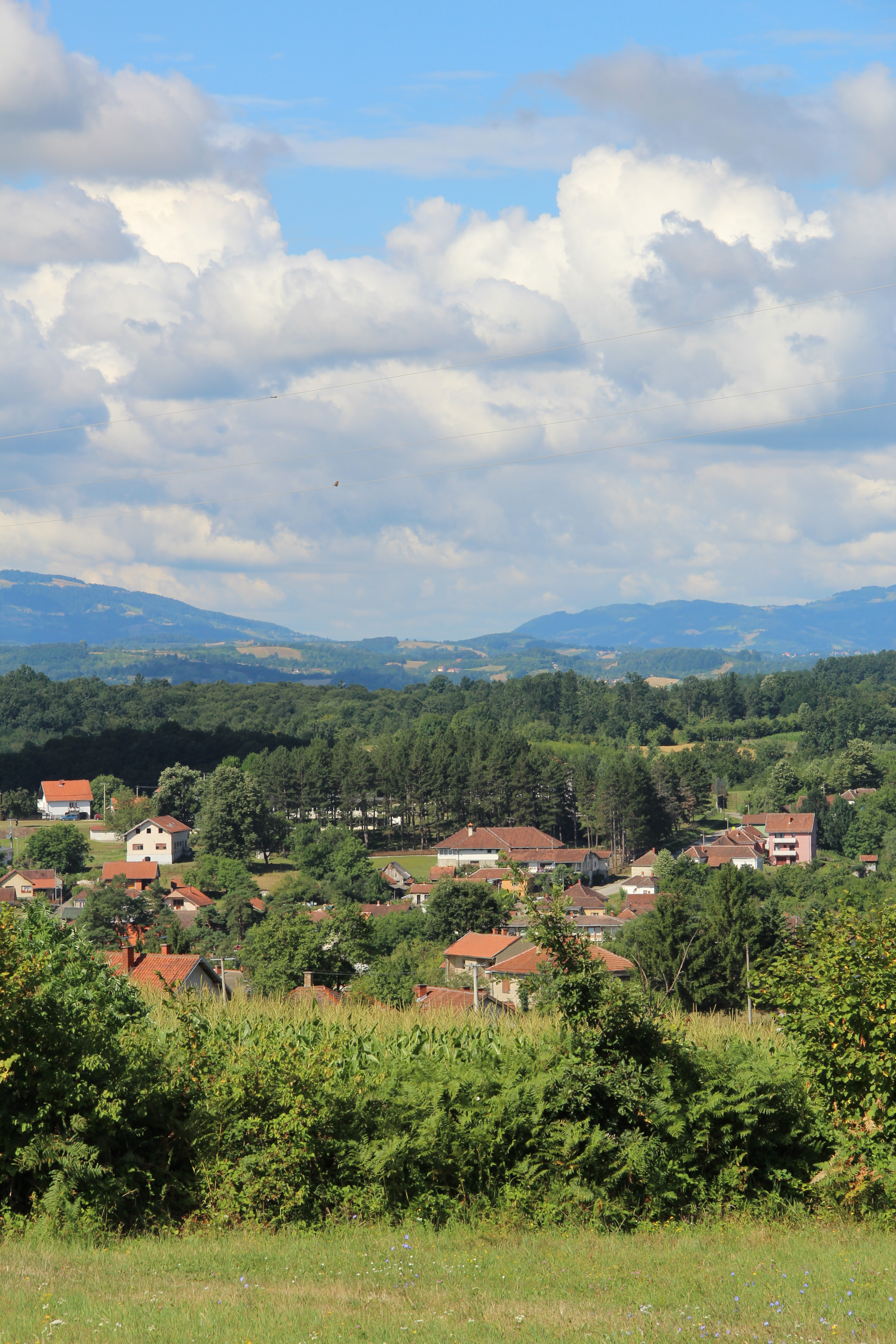
Valjevska Kamenica - Panorama

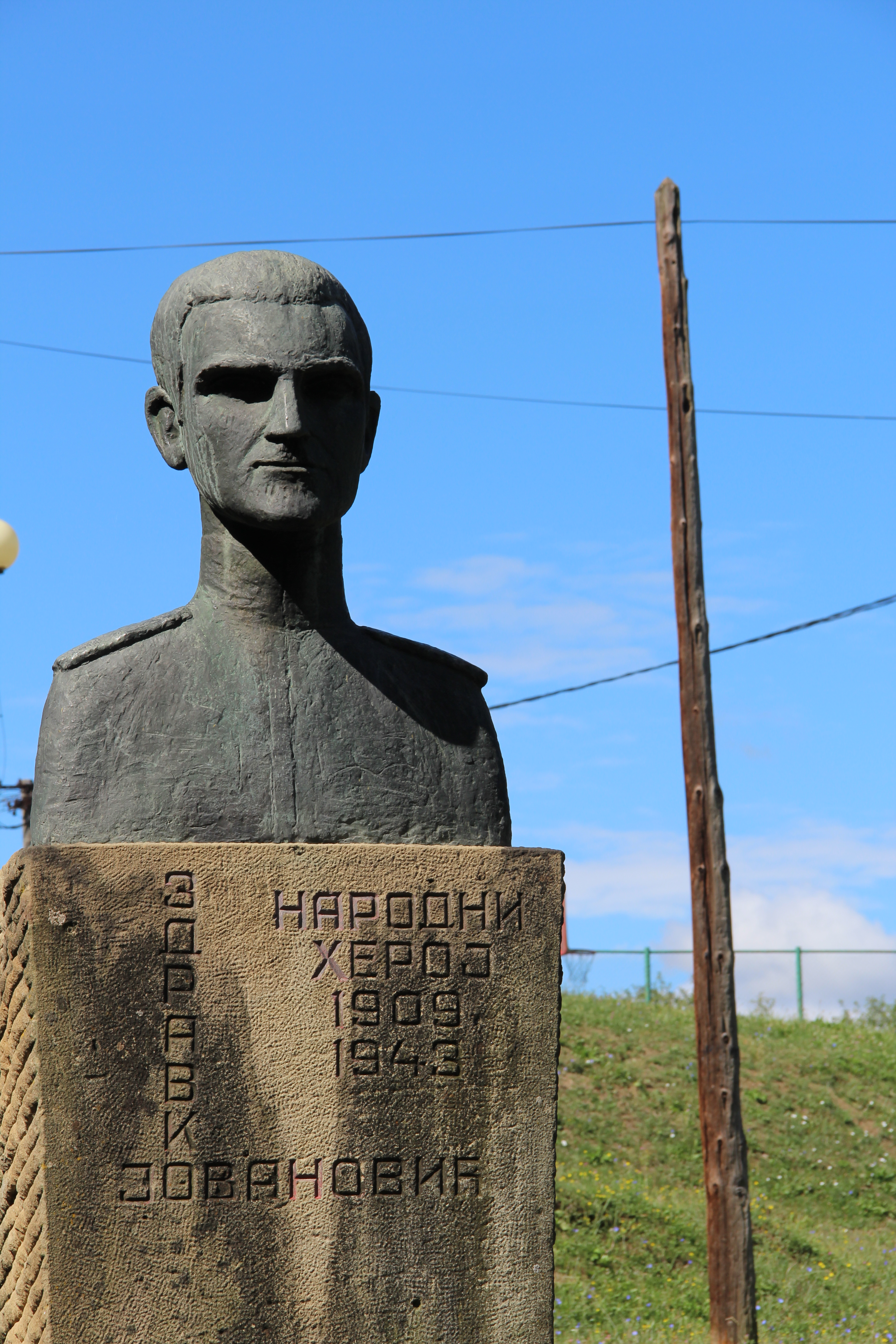
Valjevska Kamenica - monument of Zdravko Jovanovic (Vida Jocic)
