= Branko Radaković =

Serbian actor, musician, writer, and film director (1982–2018)

- Born: 26 January 1982 Paraćin, Serbia, Yugoslavia
- Died: 4 November 2018 (aged 36) Bač, Vojvodina, Serbia

Branko "Bane" Radaković (26 January 1982 – 4 November 2018) was a Serbian actor, director, rock musician, painter.

== Biography ==
He graduated elementary school and high school Gymnasium in Paraćin. In 2005, he graduated at the Belgrade's Academy of Applied Art. Radaković was a teacher of art in elementary school in Bač Serbia. In 2015, Radaković released a critically acclaimed documentary "Limunovog Drvo". He wrote a book of poetry, "Trag koji ostaje". He died on 4 November 2018 in Bač aged 36. He was interred at the Orthodox Christian cemetery in Bač.

== Filmography ==
- Time (2007)
- Unavailable freedom (2007)
- Roadway for life that doesn't exist (2007)
- Passing time (2007)
- Memory (2007)
- Waves (2007)
- A trip to Europe (2007)
- Autumn (2007)
- Face of truth (2007)
- Freedom and performance (2008)
- The Reportion about two artists (2009)
- The Bridge of love (2009)
- The Illusion (2009)
- The Hidden projection (2009)
- The Divided Serbia (2009)
- This is not a movie (2010)
- The shortest movie in the world (2010)
- Without a good title for now and without politicians, as well (2010)
- The word of God among people (2010)
- Good-bye to video tapes! (2010)
- Smoking (2011)
- Nature (2011)
- Exist (2011)
- Dream (2011)
- Once Upon a Time in Paracin (2011)
- The Tourist (2012)
- I have to do that (2012)
- Winter (2012)
- Views (2013)
- Culture is booming (2013)
