= Stojimir Dobrosavljević =

Serbian politician

Minister of Social policy and People's Health of the Government of National Salvation
- In office 26 October 1943 – 6 November 1943
- Preceded by: Jovan Mijušković
- Succeeded by: Tanasije Dinić

Personal details
- Profession: Politician

Stojimir Dobrosavljević was a Serbian politician who collaborated with the Axis powers in World War II. He served for less than two weeks as Minister of Social policy and People's Health for the Nedić regime in 1943, before the position was taken by Tanasije Dinić.
