= Veliko Orašje =

- Village (Selo)
- Location within Serbia
- Coordinates: 44°22′03″N 21°05′16″E
- Country: Serbia
- District: Podunavlje District
- Municipality: Velika Plana

Population (2002)
  - Total: 2,299
- Time zone: UTC+1 (CET)
  - Summer (DST): UTC+2 (CEST)

Veliko Orašje is a village in the municipality of Velika Plana, Serbia. According to the 2002 census, the village has a population of 2299 people.

== History ==
From 1869 to 1947 Veliko Orašje was the seat of a district in the Jasenica region, which was then reformed into Velika Plana Municipality and its seat moved to Velika Plana.

From 1929 to 1941, it was part of the Danube Banovina of the Kingdom of Yugoslavia.
