= Kostas Karagiorgis =

Prominent Greek communist (1905–1954)

Kostas Karagiorgis Κώστας Καραγιώργης
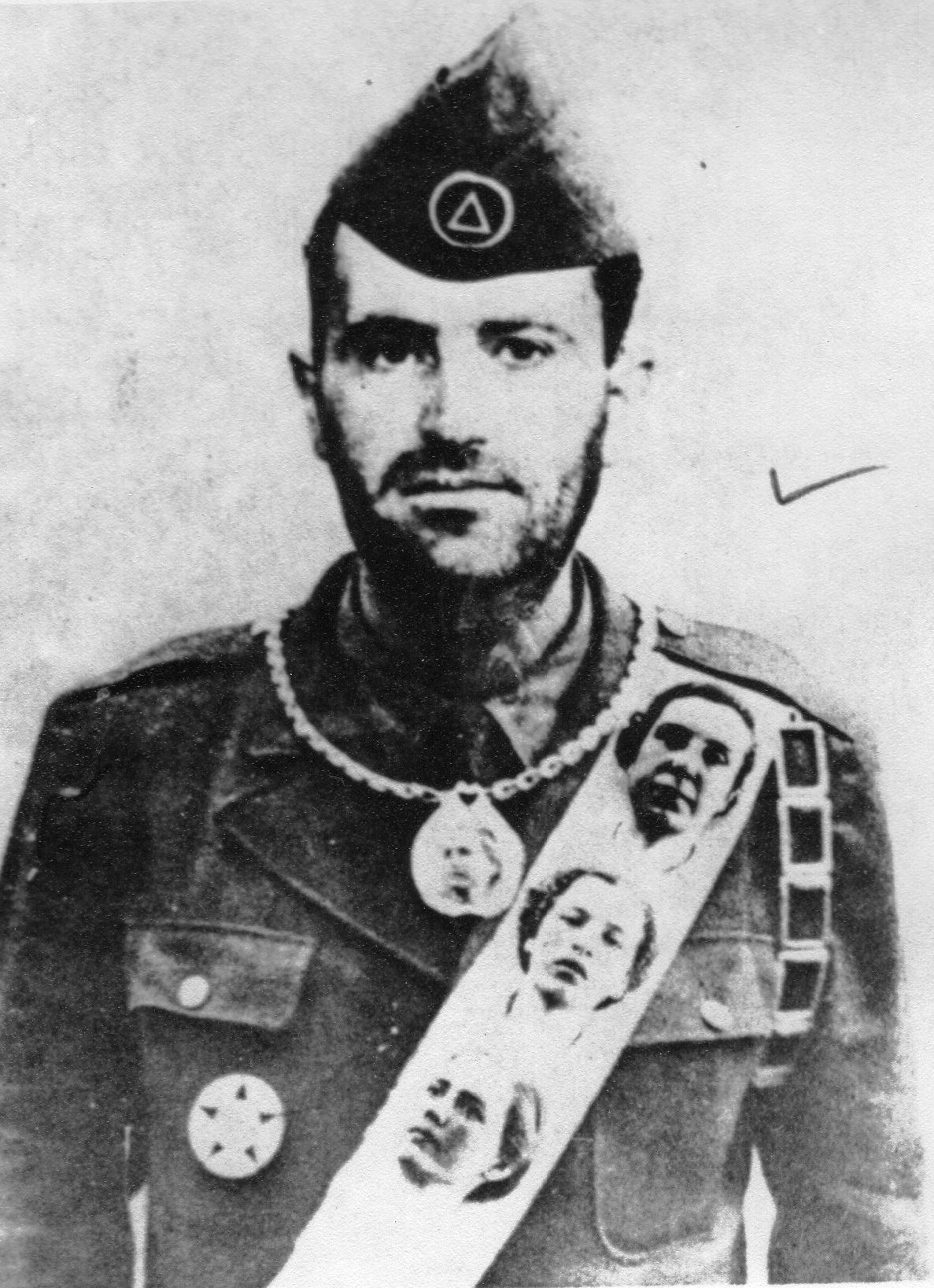
- Born: 1905; Limni, Kingdom of Greece
- Died: c. 1955 Pitești, Romanian People's Republic
- Allegiance: National Liberation Front; Provisional Democratic Government
- Branch: Democratic Army of Greece
- Service years: 1941–49
- Conflicts: World War II; Greek Civil War

Kostas Karagiorgis (Greek: Κώστας Καραγιώργης) was the alias of Kostas Gyftodimos (Κώστας Γυφτοδήμος), a prominent Greek communist who played an important role in the Greek Resistance and in the Greek Civil War.

== Early life and career ==
He was born in 1905 in the town of Limni in Euboea. He studied at the Medical School of the University of Athens, where he also became politically active as director of Neolaia, the newspaper of the Central Committee of the Young Communist League of Greece (OKNE), and assistant editor of the Communist Party of Greece's (KKE) official newspaper, Rizospastis.

After a time in prison, he left Greece in 1931 and moved to Vienna and thence to Paris in 1933. He worked there as correspondent of Rizospastis, before moving to the Soviet Union. He returned to Greece after the establishment of the dictatorial Metaxas Regime, but was arrested and imprisoned in Aegina. After completing his compulsory military service, he was sent to internal exile to the islands of Sifnos and Kimolos, along with fellow KKE members Miltiadis Porfyrogenis, Chrysa Hatzivasileiou, and Petros Rousos.

== World War II, Civil War, and aftermath ==
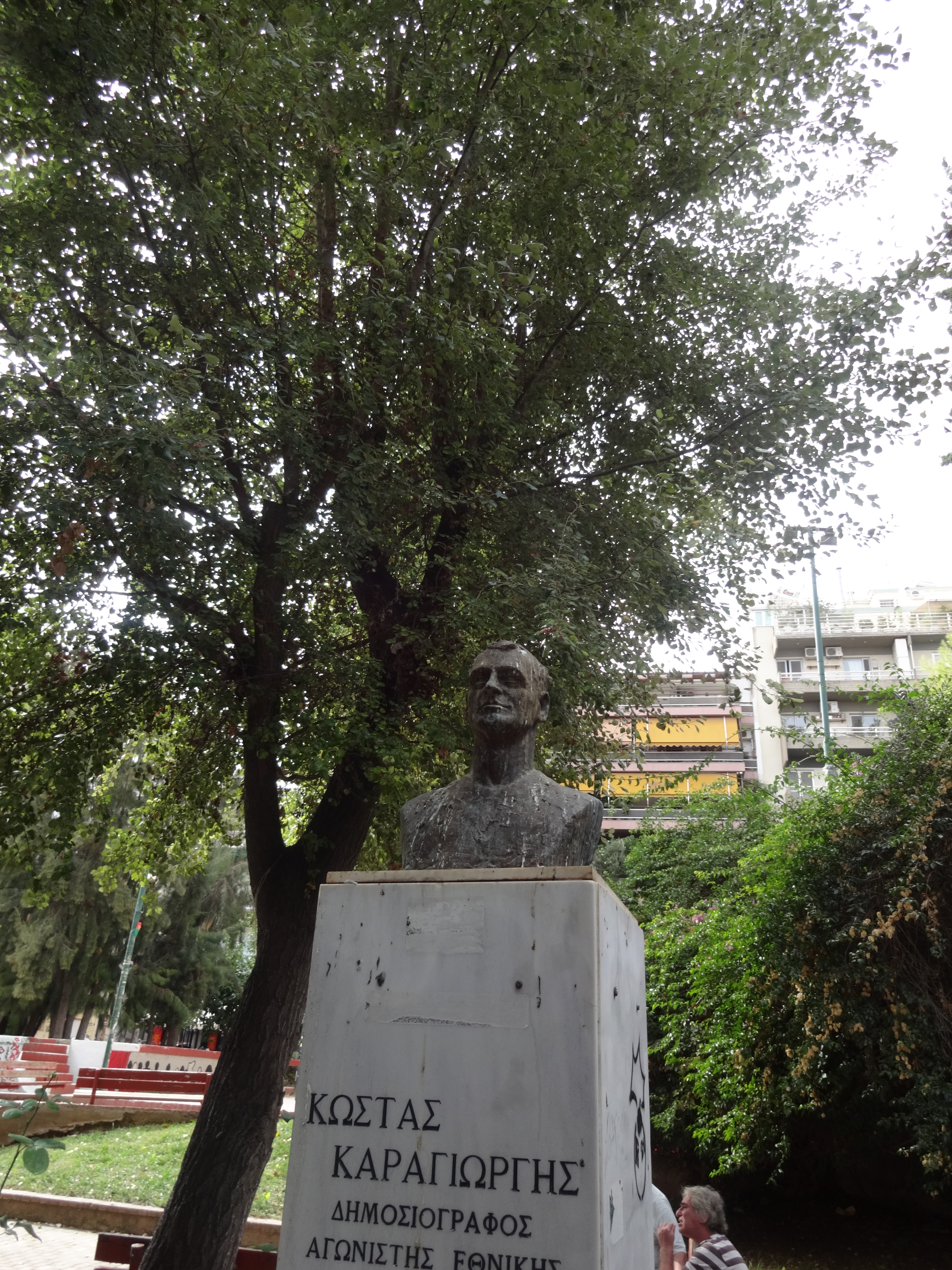
Bust of Karagiorgis in Athens

Following the start of the Greco-Italian War, they managed to escape. Karagiorgis returned to Athens, where he played a major role in the Party's underground press and the mobilization of civil servants. In the December 1943 party congress, he was elected alternate member of the Central Committee, and sent to Thessaly to supervise the operations of the National Liberation Front (EAM) and its armed wing, the Greek People's Liberation Army (ELAS). Throughout the subsequent period until the end of the Axis occupation of Greece, he was the senior KKE and EAM official in Thessaly. In 1944 he was elected to the National Council.

After liberation in 1944, he became director of Rizospastis and the weekly Rizos tis Defteras. After the outbreak of the Greek Civil War and the closing of Rizospastis, he fled Athens to the mountains of Thessaly, where he joined the Communist-run Democratic Army of Greece (DSE). In March 1948, he was moved from Thessaly to the command of the DSE General Headquarters for Southern Greece. Heavily wounded in action, he was sent to Hungary to be operated on, and on his return was made a member of the communists' "Mountain Government" as Minister for War Supply (April 1949).

After the defeat of the DSE and the end of the conflict in autumn 1949, he accused KKE General Secretary Nikos Zachariadis as responsible for the defeat, for which he was dismissed from all his Party offices and membership, and imprisoned in Romania. He was interrogated by KKE members and by the Romanian Securitate, and died in prison in Mărăcineni, probably in 1955.
