= Operation Peristera =

1948–1949 military campaign of the Greek Civil War

| Date | December 19, 1948 – April 1949 |
| Location | central and southern Peloponnese, southern Greece |

Belligerents
| (Greece) Provisional Democratic Government (Democratic Army) | Kingdom of Greece (National Army) |

Operation Peristera (Greek: Επιχείρηση «Περιστερά», "dove" in Greek) was a military campaign for control of the Peloponnese peninsula in southern Greece during the Greek Civil War.

== Background ==
In early 1947, the Peloponnese peninsula was relatively peaceful, but fighting eventually occurred in late 1947. Throughout 1948, communist control of the interior of the peninsula made the central and southern regions inaccessible to government. The communists provided good treatment to the local inhabitants in areas they controlled, and the region suffered less than other parts of Greece.

== Campaign ==
The location of the Peloponnese isolated the communists there from their comrades in northern and central Greece. During the course of the campaign, the communist leadership (operating in northern Greece) suffered a split between those loyal to Markos Vafiadis and the pro-Soviet faction of KKE General-Secretary Nikos Zachariadis, as a result of the Tito–Stalin split. At the same time, relations between the Greek communists and Tito's Yugoslavia were beginning to break down.

== Bibliography ==
- Studies in the History of the Greek Civil War, 1945–1949. Lars Bærentzen, John O. Iatrides, Ole Langwitz Smith. 1987.
