= Dimitris Vlantas =

Dimitri Vlantas

Secretary of the Communist Youth of Greece
- In office 1932–1943

Commander of the 4th ELAS Division
- In office 1944–1944

Secretary of the Communist Party of Greece in Crete
- In office 1/07/1944–1/07/1946

Personal details
- Born: 10 February 1908 Marathos, Greece
- Died: 20 July 1985 Athens, Greece
- Resting place: Athens

Dimitiris Vlantas (Greek: Δημήτρης Βλαντάς; 1908 – 1985) was the secretary of the Communist Party of Greece (KKE) in Crete from 1944 to 1946, and general in charge of the communist-led Democratic Army of Greece during the Grammos and Vitsi battles at the end of the Greek Civil War.

== Early life ==
Dimitris Vlantas, aka Dimitris Vlandas, was born in 1908 in Marathos, Crete. From a young age, he joined the Communist Youth of Greece (OKNE).In 1924 he entered the central committee of the OKNE and in 1932 enters its politburo.

== Political activity in Greece ==
Having been spotted by Nikos Zachariadis he joined a select number of high potential officials. In 1936, the Ioannis Metaxas regime outlawed the Communist Party of Greece and Dimitris Vlantas was imprisoned at Nafplio. He escaped jail in 1940.

In 1947 he became a member of the Communist Party of Greece's Politburo. In January 1948 he was named Agriculture minister in the communist-led Provisional Democratic Government during the Greek Civil War.

== Civil War ==
During the last phase of the civil war, Zachariadis and Vlantas regrouped the remaining forces in the strongholds of Grammos and Vitsi, commanded by Dimitris Vlantas. This strategy was negatively viewed by Enver Hoxha as he tells in his 4th Meeting with Joseph Stalin where he mentions: "Comrade Vlantas held that the enemy would direct the main blow against Gramos and not against Vitsi, because 'Gramos is less fortified, as it is situated on the border with Albania, and the enemy, after defeating us there, will turn back to attack us at Vitsi, because it thinks it can annihilate us there, since it borders on Yugoslavia. After fighting at Gramos and inflicting great losses on the enemy, we shall manoeuvre with our forces from Grammos in order to attack the enemy forces at Vitsi from the rear."

Indeed the battle of Grammos, known as Operation Pyrsos proved to defeat.

== Post-war ==
After the war, he went in exile in Romania, first in Bucharest then in Rimnicu Vilcea. He lived there with his wife Eleni, his daughter Eugenia and his son Georges Vlandas, who is President of the European Commission Trade Union 'Union for Unity' (U4U) and lives in Brussels. His grandsons, Alexis Vlandas and Tim Vlandas, are both academics in France and the UK, respectively. He fled Romania for France in 1967 where he was joined by his family in 1968. In 1983, he donated his archives to the Bibliothèque d'Histoire Contemporaine of the University of Nanterre. They can be accessed through the Bibliothèque Nationale website.
