= Operation Pyrsos =

Military operation

- Part of Greek Civil War
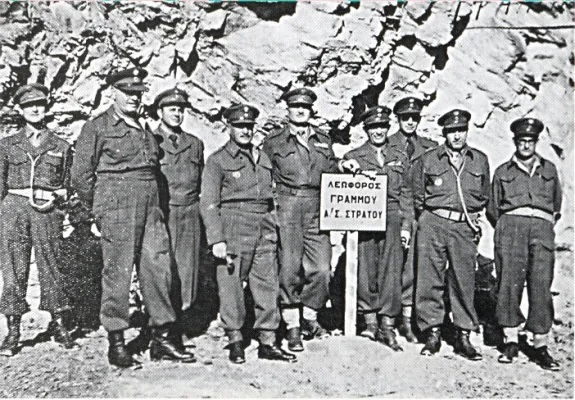
- The leadership of the National Army after the successful operations in Grammos sector
Date	August 2–30, 1949
Location	Grammos and Vitsi, West Macedonia, northwestern Greece
Result	National Army victory: End of the Greek Civil War

Belligerents
(Greece) Provisional Democratic Government Support: People's Republic of Albania (until August 25)	Kingdom of Greece Support: United States

Commanders and leaders
(Greece) Markos Vafeiadis	(Greece) Alexandros Papagos; Konstantinos Ventiris

Strength
8,000–13,000	50,000 (6 divisions) artillery 50 aircraft

Casualties and losses
1,182 dead about 3,000 wounded 1,632 prisoners and deserters	256 dead 1,336 wounded

Operation Pyrsos (Greek: Επιχείρηση «Πυρσός», "Torch") was the final campaign launched by the National Army of the internationally recognized Greek government against the communist forces during the Greek Civil War. After the success of the preceding Operation Pyravlos, communist forces in central Greece had been defeated and only the mountain strongholds of Grammos and Vitsi in northwestern Greece remained under their control. Yugoslavian assistance to the communists had come to an end in February 1949 amid the Tito–Stalin split. The National Army launched a diversionary attack on Grammos and their main force at Vitsi. On August 25, following a massive attack by the National Army with aircraft and artillery, the Albanian government of Enver Hoxha cut off its assistance to the Greek communist forces; he did not attempt to disarm the Greek communists on his territory, but threatened to cut off food supplies if they returned to Greece. The operation ended on August 30. The Greek communists formally surrendered in mid-October, ending the Greek Civil War.

== Background ==
Towards the end of the Greek Civil War, the Soviet Union who had previously been supporting and supplying the Greek communist rebels, cut all incoming supplies to the rebels in line with the percentages agreement. This move left the Greek communist rebels weakened and after Yugoslavia withdrew support to the rebels in July 1949, their only safe haven to launch invasions against the government forces of Greece lay in Albania. Leskovik, near the Greek-Albanian border became for a period the headquarter of the Greek communist rebels hosting a training and supply center, as well as medical facilities for the Greek communist guerrillas, who would retreat back to Albania once their missions were completed.

In this period, both the British and French governments reported internally that the Greek army was preparing to move into Albania. The later provided the only base for Greek partisans launching artillery and mortar fire against national forces.

At the same time, the Greek government was pursuing negotiations to normalize relations with Albania. On the other hand, in Albania support to the Greek communist guerrillas was growing. Radio Tirana reported on 3 January 1948 that financial aid to the guerrillas already totalled over 630,000 leks. The Albanian government also permitted them to establish a radio station. The state-controlled Albanian press and radio service also regularly issued communiqués and appeals on behalf of the guerrillas. Albania also established a concentration camp for abducted Greeks at Elbasan. In one incident in August 20, 1948, the armed group of Markos Vafeiadis was ambushed by the Greek government forces near the Albanian border. However, he was saved only after he crossed into Albania, withdrawing under covering fire by Albanian border guards.

== Phases of the operation ==
=== Pyrsos I (August 2-8) ===
For the first phase, the plan was to carry out sporadic deceptive attacks in the area of Grammos, in order to divert the attention of Democratic Army and let it think that the main attack of the National Army was to happen there; thus pinning down most of its forces to a single location.

The army's deployment for the implementation of Pyrsos I began in the early hours of August 2, 1949. During that operation, which lasted for six days, the National Army managed to occupy some key points in Grammos, which were later used in Pyrsos III. On August 8, Pyrsos I had fulfilled its purpose. Giorgis Blanas, also known by his nom-de-guerre Kissavos, who was fighting on the side of the Democratic Army, wrote the following about this phase of the operation:

Τό ἠθικό (τοῦ στρατοῦ) ἧταν πολύ ἀνώτερο ἀπ' ὅ,τι στόν Γράμμο στα 1948 ἤ τουλάχιστον ἡ ἐκπαίδευσή του καί ἡ πειθαρχία τῶν στρατιωτῶν του ἧταν τελειότερες. Οἱ φαντάροι του ἐνεργοῦσαν κάτω ἀπό τήν ἐπίδραση βίας ἀόρατης ἤ κάποιας νάρκωσης. Βάδιζαν ὄρθιοι, κρατώντας ὁρισμένα σημεῖα ἀναγνώρισης γιά τήν ἀεροπορία καί τό πυροβολικό τους καί ἂν πλαγιοβάλλονταν ἀπό μάς μέ πολυβόλα καί ὅλμους, δέ χαλνοῦσαν τή διάταξή τους ὣς τό σημεῖο ἐξόρμησης, δηλαδή 40 ἕως 80 μέτρα – ἀνάλογα μέ τό ἔδαφος – μπροστά ἀπ' τά πολυβολεῖα μας.
The morale (of the National Army) was much higher than in Grammos during 1948, or at least its training and the discipline of its soldiers were more perfect. The soldiers were acting under the influence of an invisible force or some drug. They marched upright, made certain signs in order to be distinguished by their air force and artillery units, and if they were flanked by us with machine guns and mortars, they did not break their formation until it was time to make their attacks; that is 40 to 80 meters – depending on the terrain – in front of our machine guns.

=== Pyrsos II (August 10-15) ===
Both Great Britain and the United States objected an assault against Albania. As such the Greek government forces only pursued the communist guerrillas who were retreating towards Albania. Greek units moved a few kilometers beyond the border and clashed sporadically with Albanian border patrols. By August 10 the I Army Corps of the Greek army under Lieutenant General Thrasyvoulos Tsakalotos was able to turn towards the heavily fortified, 375-square-mile mountain Vitsi sector. The communist guerrillas at one point were also supported by Albanian troops.

The aim of the National Army was to capture Vitsi and neutralize the forces of the Democratic Army there. The attack against Vitsi began two days after the end of Pyrsos I in the area of Grammos, and was meant to be the core of the broader operation. The attack was carried out by six army divisions that had a separate strength of 17 brigades, 9 battalions of light infantry, and were supported by 110 artillery guns, a number of tanks and armored vehicles, as well as 87 airplanes. The Democratic Army's forces defending Vitsi, were composed of two divisions, two brigades, 45 mountain guns, 15 anti-aircraft guns, and 27 anti-tank guns. They also had significant fortifications that were inaccessible to the guns of the National Army, within which they were ordered to hold the defense, until an order of a counter-attack was to be given.

Vitsi, as a front, was divided into three sectors; the right one which bordered Albania through the Mali–Madi mountain range, and the central and left, which bordered Yugoslavia through the Blena–Vonda mountain range. The most vulnerable sector was the central one, because it had a public road that crossed it and could be accessed by vehicles. From this road the forces of the Democratic Army were severely attacked on August 10, 1949, preceded by heavy aerial bombardment and artillery fire; from the gap that was created passed the 11th army division and a company of Mountain Raiders, which advanced to the south of the Democratic Army's forces, in the position of Tsouka. As a result, the forces of the Democratic Army in Vitsi were divided in two parts.

On August 12, 1949, there was a new advance of the National Army. The 3rd Special Forces Division forced the Democratic Army to retreat towards the small Pyxos peninsula, between the Little and Great Prespa Lakes; while attacks by the National Army's air force inflicted heavy casualties on them. The army began to carry out landing operations on Pyxos from the lakes. Henceforth, the forces of the Democratic Army in Vitsi were in a desperate situation, and on the night of August 14–15, 1949, they retreated and took refuge in Albanian territory.

Despite their heavy losses, the Democratic Army retreated orderly. Some 2,500 fighters were able to break away from Vitsi and cross to Grammos; reinforcing their remaining forces there. However, their losses were heavy; it was the only instance where the National Army took full advantage of its weaponry and numerical superiority, because its original objective of totally exterminating the Democratic Army with the fall of Vitsi, had failed. The Chief of the National Army's general staff considered their escape as a defeat for the army, which is why he ordered interrogations. The result was to replace the commanders of three divisions, two brigades and the II Army Corps.

The losses for the National Army during Pyrsos II were significant. Namely, 256 soldiers and officers were killed, and 1,336 were wounded. The losses for the Democratic Army were 1,182 dead and 637 prisoners, as well as 40 field and mountain guns, 33 anti-tank guns, 16 anti-aircraft guns, 115 mortars, and other smaller arms.

=== Pyrsos III (August 25-30) ===
The third and final phase aimed at the capture of the area of Grammos with a decisive attack, in order to neutralize the remaining forces of the Democratic Army and block their escape to Albania.

After the fall of Vitsi, Grammos was the last stronghold of the Democratic Army left in Greece, where all their remaining forces had gathered. Pyrsos III would be directed by Lieutenant General Thrasyvoulos Tsakalotos, with five army divisions at his disposal, an independent brigade, four light infantry regiments, 120 artillery guns, plenty of armored vehicles suitable for rough terrain, and the entire air force which was reinforced with Helldiver dive bombers equipped with Napalm bombs; this was the first time such bombs were used by Greek Air Force.

The army of Tsakalotos, now experienced in partisan warfare, faced about 8,000 Democratic Army fighters (men and women) in Grammos; including the 2,500 fighters who had escaped from neighboring Vitsi. However, the forces of the Democratic Army were poorly armed and supplied, and also tired from their continuous presence on the front line due to lack of reserves. The battle was expected to be fatal for the rebels; it was evident that the situation was very different from 1947 and 1948 in the same area, when the rebels managed to recover from the National Army's attacks and eventually counter-attack. Nikos Zachariadis on the other hand, tried to remain optimistic, and issued the following:

Ὁ ἐχθρός συγκεντρώνεται στό Γράμμο γιά μιά ἀποφασιστική ἀναμέτρηση [λέει ἡ ἀπόφαση μέ ἡμερομηνία 20 Αὐγούστου 1949]. Στό Γράμμο ἔχουμε ὅλες τίς δυνατότητες νά καταφέρουμε τό θανάσιμο πλῆγμα στόν ἐχθρό. Ἔχουμε ἀρκετές δυνάμεις καί μέσα. Πιό πλεονεκτικό ἔδαφος. Στό Γράμμο ἀπέτυχε πέρυσι ὁ μοναρχοφασισμός. Στό Γράμμο φέτος τοῦ καταφέραμε σοβαρό χτύπημα μέ τόν ἐλιγμό τοῦ Ἀπρίλη. Στό Γράμμο ἀπό τίς 2 μέχρι 8 Αὐγούστου ἔσπασε τά μοῦτρα του. Ἔχουμε καί τήν πείρα τοῦ Βίτσι καί τό σοβαρό μάτωμα πού προκαλέσαμε στόν ἐχθρό στό Βίτσι... Ἐδῶ μποροῦμε καί πρέπει νά θάψωμε τό μοναρχοφασισμό.
The enemy is gathering in Grammos for a decisive confrontation [says the decision dated August 20, 1949]. In Grammos we have the capability to deliver a death blow to the enemy. We have enough forces and means. More advantageous terrain. It was last year that monarcho-fascism failed in Grammos. It was in Grammos this year that we managed to deliver a serious blow to it with our April maneuver. It was in Grammos from August 2 to 8 where it was defeated. We also have the experience from Vitsi, and the serious bloodshed we caused to the enemy there... Here we can and must bury monarcho-fascism.

In the early hours of August 25, 1949, the forces of the National Army were ordered by General Tsakalotos to move against their targets and execute the plan of Pyrsos III. The beginning of the attack took on a festive character. King Paul and the American Lieutenant General James Van Fleet, were invited by Tsakalotos in a special vantage point in the Ammouda region of Grammos, from where they watched the successive waves of the National Army's attack with military binoculars.

On August 26, the National Army managed to avoid considerable losses because its 9th Division outflanked the Democratic Army's defensive line along the Greek-Albanian border. The 9th division, advanced to the rear of the rebels, and occupied the Porta Osman crossing; the main gateway of communication between the Greek and Albania territories in the area of Grammos.

There was one more free passage to Albania; the Bara crossing. When the 9th division began to blockade the Greek-Albanian border, the Democratic Army's headquarters realized the danger of entrapment of its forces in Grammos, and gave the order to cross the Greek-Albanian border and take refuge in Albania, from the remaining crossing of Bara. The following account was given by the commander of the Democratic Army, Georgios Gousias:

Ἀπ' τά μέλη τῆς καθοδήγησης εἴχαμε μείνει εγώ καί ὁ Ν. Ζαχαριάδης, ὅλοι οἱ ἄλλοι εἴχαν μπεῖ στήν Ἀλβανία. Τά ξημερώματα στίς 29 Αὐγούστου ἀποφασίσαμε ἐγώ καί ὁ Ζαχαριάδης, νά τραβήχτοῦμε πρός τ' ἀλβανικό ἔδαφος κοντά ἀπ' τά τμήματα, γιά νά παρακολουθήσουμε τήν ὑποχώρηση τῶν τμημάτων μας. Ἔδωσα ἐντολή στούς ἄντρες νά ἑτοιμαστοῦν γιά κίνηση γιά νά ἐγκαταλείψουμε τό ἑλληνικό ἔδαφος. Ὁ Ν. Ζαχαριάδης καθόταν ξαπλωμένος καί δέν ἤθελε νά σηκωθεῖ. Τοῦ εἶπα ὅτι μᾶς παίρνει τό ξημέρωμα, τό μέρος εἶναι τελείως ἀνοχύρωτο καί θά βομβαρδιστεῖ γερά, γι' αυτό σήκω νά τραβηχτοῦμε στή νέα θέση. Μοῦ ἀπάντησε ὁτι θά προτιμοῦσε νά πεθάνει ἐδῶ. Τοῦ εἶπα ὅτι, εἶσαι ἡγέτης ἑνός λαϊκοῦ κινήματος μέ τήν πιό μεγάλη καί πλούσια ἀγωνιστική δράση καί δέν ἔχεις δικαίωμα νά αὐτοκτονήσεις. Πρέπει καί τήν ἥττα νά τή δεχόμαστε μέ ψυχραιμία, νά βγεῖς νά τήν ἐξηγήσεις καί νά χαράξεις τόν καινούργιο δρόμο που θ' ἀκολουθήσουμε. Μετά ἀπ' αὐτά πού ἀνταλλάξαμε, σηκώθηκε καί προχώρησε.
Of the members of the leadership, I and N. Zachariadis were left, all the others had entered Albania. At dawn on August 29, Zachariadis and I decided to withdraw to the Albanian territory next to our divisions, in order to observe their retreat. I ordered the men to get ready to move so that we could leave Greek territory. N. Zachariadis was lying down and would not get up. I told him that sunrise was near, the place was completely unfortified and that it would be bombarded heavily, so get up in order to move to a position. He replied that he would rather die here. I told him that you are the leader of a people's movement with the largest and richest activity, and you have no right to kill yourself. We must also be able to accept defeat; you go out and explain it and make a new plan for us to follow. After this discussion, he got up and went on.

During the same night, the victorious forces of the National Army who had advanced to the Greek-Albanian border, lit huge fires along its entire length, so as to demarcate the border between Greece and Albania. On August 30, the peak of Kamenik fell; the last stronghold of the Democratic Army in Grammos.

During Pyrsos III, the National Army had 243 dead and 1,452 wounded soldiers, while the Democratic Army lost 922 fighters and 944 were captured. The latter left by taking their wounded and their military equipment, except for 17 mountain guns, 15 anti-aircraft guns, and 8 anti-tank guns; all collected by the National Army. After the fall of Grammos and Vitsi, there were still a few scattered pockets of rebels in Greece, which could no longer be considered capable of threatening the establishment. According to the data of the National Army's general staff, in September 1949 there were still 2,150 rebels throughout Greece, who were gradually decreasing due to many desertions. In October they were estimated at 1,750, and in November at 1,270. By December 1949, the rebels had been reduced to 800. In 1950 there were still some armed men in the mountains, which is indicated by the official data concerning the casualties of the army for that year. On October 16, 1949, Dimitrios Partsalidis, as president of the Provisional Democratic Government (the administration that was declared by the Communist Party of Greece), announced on radio the end of hostilities:

Ὁ ΔΣΕ [εἶπε] δέν κατέθεσε τά ὁπλα μά μονάχα τά ἔθεσε παρά πόδα. Ὑπεχώρησε μπροστά στήν τεράστια ὑπεροχή τοῦ μοναρχοφασισμοῦ...
The Democratic Army of Greece did not lay down its arms, but only lowered them. It yielded in front of the enormous supremacy of monarcho-fascism...

== Aftermath ==
Albanian involvement in the Greek Civil War ceased only in the late summer of 1949, when it became clear that the communist-led Greek guerrillas would be defeated by the Greek national forces. The Albanian government fearing an attack by the Greek army, disarmed the communist guerrillas that were located in Albania and insisted that the later should leave the country. Soviet policy also dictated that any further Albanian involvement in the Greek civil war should be avoided, otherwise the independence of Albania would have been found in jeopardy. At September 11 Greek Prime Minister Panagiotis Kanellopoulos warned Albania that any renewed support to the communist guerrillas would result in Greek military action.

In September, the Greek minister of military affairs warned that if the Albanian state authorities continued to support the retreating insurgents within their territory, Greece would invade by invoking the right of ‘self-defence’. As such, Albania finally disarmed the communist insurgents and deported them to Soviet Union in accordance with Stalin’s instructions.
