= Apostolos Grozos =

Greek politician

Apostolos Grozos (Greek: Απόστολος Γκρόζος; 12 June 1892 – 22 June 1981) was a Greek Communist activist, General Secretary of the Central Committee of the Communist Party of Greece from 1957 to 1974, and Honorary Chairman since 1974.

== Biography ==
Grozos was born in Komotini, Thrace (then part of the Adrianople Vilayet of the Ottoman Empire) in 1892.

He was a tobacco worker. From 1914 to 1917 he served in the Greek army as a private. From 1910 he took part in the trade union movement, and in 1920 he joined the Communist Party of Greece. He took part in the leadership of the party organizations of the KKE in Thessaloniki, Macedonia and Corfu. From 1926 to 1935 he was secretary of the executive committee of the Hellenic Tobacco Federation. In 1936 he was elected a member and secretary of the executive committee of the Panhellenic Tobacco Federation.

Between 1937 and 1943 he was imprisoned and exiled. During World War II, he took part in the struggle against the fascist occupation of Greece. In 1946 he was elected Secretary General of the Panhellenic Tobacco Federation and a member of the National Council of the General Confederation of Greek Workers. From 1948 to 1949 he worked for the party in the Democratic Army of Greece and participated in the Greek Civil War.

On December 30, 1952, at the 4th Plenary session, he was elected leader of the KKE's Central Committee Directorate. In 1956, following the deposing of Nikolaos Zachariadis from the position as general secretary, Grozos was appointed temporary leader of the KKE. He was replaced by Konstantinos Koligiannis in 1958.

Grozos died in 1981 in Bucharest.

== Sources ==
- Kathimerini, 5 January 1953
