= Petros Rousos =

Greek communist politician (1908–1992)

Petros Rousos (Greek: Πέτρος Ρούσος; 1908–1992), born Petros Polychronidis (Πέτρος Πολυχρονίδης), was a Greek communist politician, author and journalist. Born in Eastern Thrace and spending his youth in Russia, on his arrival in Greece in 1932 he quickly climbed the ranks of the Communist Party of Greece, becoming director of the party newspaper, Rizospastis. Imprisoned by the Metaxas Regime, he escaped in 1941 and played a leading role in the Greek Resistance in the ranks of the National Liberation Front and as a member of the Communist Party politburo. During the Greek Civil War, he served as the Foreign Minister of the communist-led Provisional Democratic Government. After the communists' defeat in 1949, he remained in Soviet exile until 1974, when he returned to Greece, where he remained until his death. He was married to another leading communist politician, Chrysa Hatzivasileiou, but distanced himself from her in 1949, when she criticized Party chairman Nikos Zachariadis.

== Works ==
- Marxism-Leninism, the worldview of the proletariat (Μαρξισμός – Λενινισμός, η κοσμοθεωρία του προλεταριάτου), 1933.
- Dimitris Glinos, the life of the thinker and fighter of the Modern Greek Renaissance (Δημήτρης Γληνός, η πορεία του διανοητή-αγωνιστή της Νεοελληνικής Αναγέννησης) 1943.
- Questions of our History: Formation of the Greek nation (Ζητήματα της Ιστορίας μας: Διαμόρφωση του ελληνικού έθνους), 1955.
- Reference aid for a new history of Greece: Turkish and Venetian rule (Βοήθημα νέας ιστορίας της Ελλάδας: Τουρκοκρατία-Βενετοκρατία), 1958.
- The October Revolution and Greece (Η Οχτωβριανή Επανάσταση και η Ελλάδα), 1967.
- Of Youth, tales for the youth (Της νιότης, αφηγήματα για τη νεολαία), 1972.
- The Great Quinquennium, 1940-1945 (Η Μεγάλη Πενταετία, 1940-1945), 1976.
