= Operation Pyravlos =

Date	May 5 – late July 1949
Location	Thessaly, central Greece
Result	National Army victory

Belligerents
(Greece) Provisional Democratic Government: Democratic Army	Kingdom of Greece: National Army

Commanders and leaders
(Greece) Unknown	(Greece) General Alexander Papagos

Operation Pyravlos (Greek: Επιχείρηση «Πύραυλος», "Rocket") was a military campaign of the Greek Civil War launched by the National Army of the Athens-based internationally recognized government, under General Alexander Papagos. All communist forces in central Greece were defeated and the only areas that remained under communist control were in the Grammos and Vitsi mountains.
