= Markos Vafeiadis =

Greek communist guerrilla during World War II and Greek Civil War (1906–1992)

- Μάρκος Βαφειάδης
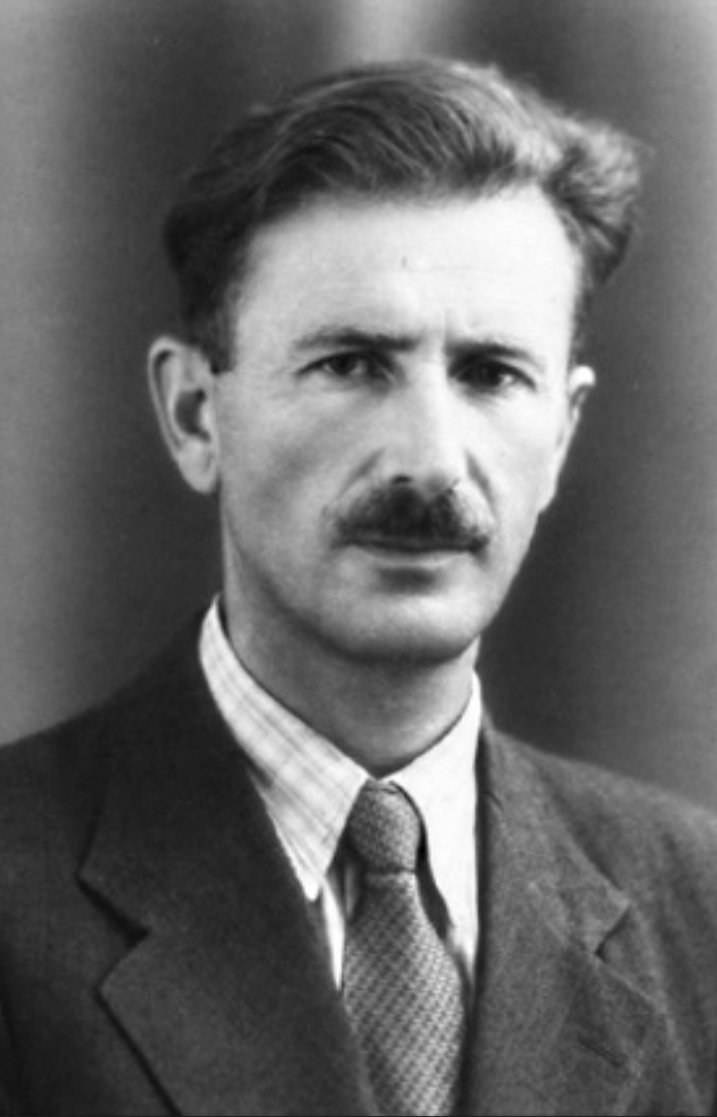

Member of the Hellenic Parliament for National list
- In office 5 November 1989 – 22 February 1992
- Parliamentary group: PASOK

Head of the Provisional Democratic Government
- In office December 24, 1947 – February 7, 1949
- Succeeded by: Dimitrios Partsalidis

Personal details
- Born: 28 January 1906 Tosya, Ottoman Empire
- Died: 22 February 1992 (aged 86) Athens, Greece
- Resting place: First Cemetery of Athens
- Party: Communist Party of Greece; Panhellenic Socialist Movement
- Nickname: Kapetan Markos

Military service
- Allegiance: (Greece) Provisional Democratic Government
- Branch/service: Greek People's Liberation Army (ELAS); Democratic Army of Greece (DSE)
- Years of service: 1941–1945 (ELAS); 1946–1949 (DSE)
- Rank: General
- Battles/wars: Greek Resistance, Greek Civil War

Markos Vafeiadis (also spelled as Vafiadis and Vafiades; Greek: Μάρκος Βαφειάδης; 28 January 1906 – 22 February 1992) was a leading figure of the Communist Party of Greece (KKE) during the Greek Resistance and the Greek Civil War.

== Pre-war life ==
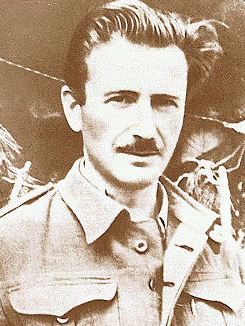
Markos Vafeiadis in 1931, at the start of his political rise.

Vafiedis was born in Tosya, Ottoman Empire in 1906 although some sources claim he was born in Şenkaya, Erzurum in present-day Turkey. At the age of 17, after the Population exchange between Greece and Turkey of 1923, Vafeiadis went to Thessaloniki and Kavala as a refugee. From 1928, he worked in Thessaloniki as a member of the Young Communist League of Greece (OKNE). In 1932, he was imprisoned and sent to internal exile for his political action. After his release in October 1933, he worked as party instructor in many areas of Greece.

At the beginning of Ioannis Metaxas' dictatorship (the "4th of August Regime") he was exiled again to the island of Ai Stratis, but managed to escape in less than a month. Subsequently, he worked in the party's underground organization in Crete and was one of the leaders of the Chania uprising against the dictatorial regime (July 28, 1938). After the suppression of the uprising, he went to Athens where he was arrested. He was jailed in Akronafplia and was exiled to the island of Gavdos.

== Resistance and Civil War ==
In May 1941, at the beginning of the Nazi German occupation of Greece, he, along with other Greek military prisoners, escaped from the island of Gavdos and began what was to become the original underground work against the German occupation, initially in Crete, later in Athens, Thessaloniki and eventually all of Macedonia. In 1942, he was elected into the Central Committee of the Communist Party of Greece and was named supervisor of the Macedonia wing of the Greek People's Liberation Army (ELAS). In May 1944, he was elected as a representative of Thessaloniki to the national congress that took place at the village of Koryschades in Evrytania, but was unable to attend. On 30 October 1944, after the withdrawal of the German army, and following battles against the Security Battalions, he entered as liberator in Thessaloniki with his men of ELAS.

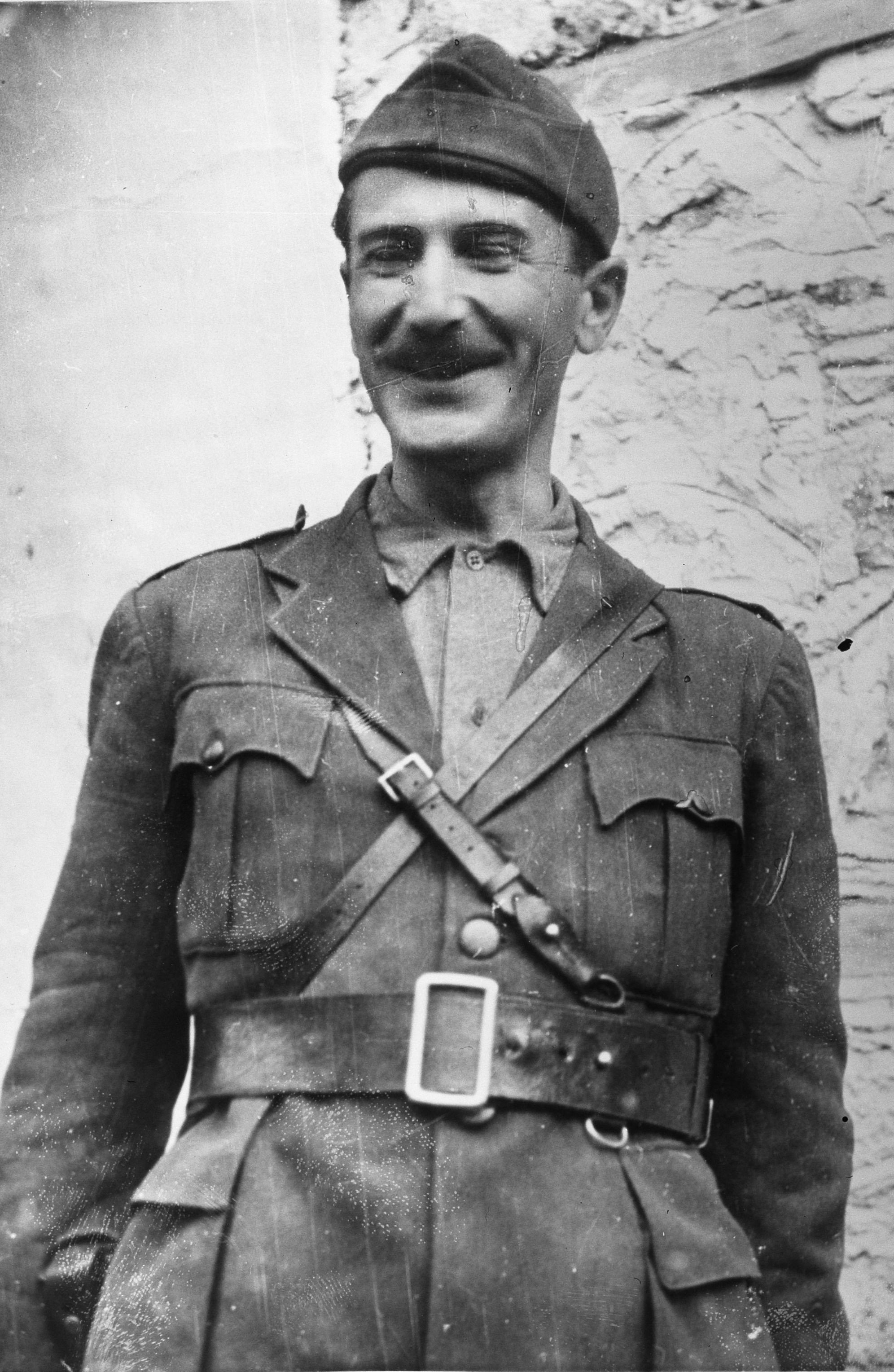
Markos Vafeiadis in 1948

In November 1944, his forces liberated Central Macedonia and helped save thousands of Greek Jews from imminent peril from the exiting Nazi regime. In February 1946, Markos Vafeiadis disagreed with Nikos Zachariadis, the general secretary of KKE, who wanted to create a standing communist army. Vafeiadis believed that the forces of the Greek government were too strong, and the best option for the KKE was a guerrilla struggle.

However, in July 1946, Zachariadis appointed him as leader of the communist guerrilla formations. In October 1946, when the General Command of the Democratic Army of Greece (DSE) was founded, Vafeiadis assumed its leadership, and in December 1947 he was appointed Prime Minister and War Minister of the Provisional Democratic Government.

During the last stages of the Civil War his disagreement with Zachariadis on issues of military doctrine led to his removal from leadership (August 1948) and later from all offices (January 1949). In October 1950, he was ousted from the Communist Party, while he was in exile in the Soviet Union, where he had fled after the breakup of the DSE.

== Post-Civil War ==
After the end of Joseph Stalin's era, Markos Vafeiadis was restored into KKE and was elected as a member of the Political Bureau of the Central Committee of the party. However, new disagreement with the party leadership led to his removal from office in January 1958 and to his second ousting from the KKE in June 1964. After the party split in 1968, the "interior" (εσωτερικού) faction of the KKE restored him. In March 1983, ending his 33-year exile in the Soviet Union, he returned to Greece and the island of Chios where he later published his Memoirs. Ηe became a political supporter of Andreas Papandreou and in November 1989 and April 1990, he was honorarily elected into the Greek parliament through the nationwide list of the Panhellenic Socialist Movement (PASOK). In 1984 he was awarded the rank of the General of the Hellenic army.

== Bibliography ==
- Dominique Eude, Les Kapetanios (in French, Greek and English), Artheme Fayard, 1970

Preceded by (none)	Head of Provisional Democratic Government; December 24, 1947 – February 7, 1949	Succeeded by Dimitrios Partsalidis
