= Provisional Democratic Government =

1947-1949 communist government in Greece

Provisional Democratic Government Προσωρινή Δημοκρατική Κυβέρνηση Prosoriní Dimokratikí Kyvérnisi
- 1947–1949
- Flag Emblem of the DSE
- Motto: "Βαθιά Ψυχή!"; Vathiá Psychí; Deep soul!
- Anthem: "Imnos is tin Eleftherian"; Ὕμνος εἰς τὴν Ἐλευθερίαν "Hymn to Freedom"
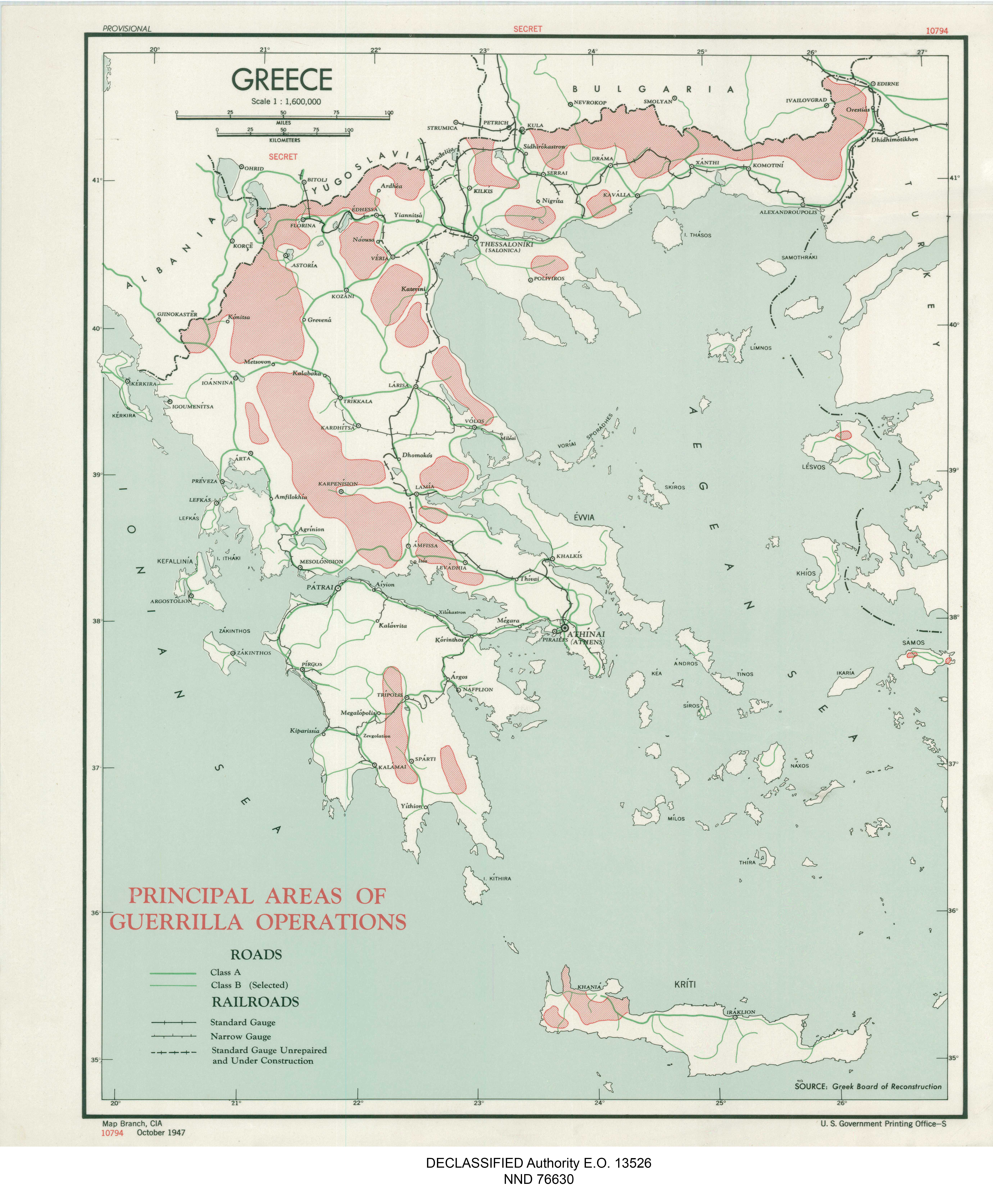
- Areas controlled by Greek partisan guerrilla operations
- Status: Rival government
- Capital: Gramos (de facto)
- Official languages: Greek
- Common languages: Demotic Greek
- Religion: Secular state
- Government: Communist state
- Chairman
  - 1947–1949: Markos Vafiadis
  - 1949–1950 (in exile): Dimitrios Partsalidis
- Deputy Chairman
  - 1947–1949: Ioannis Ionnidis
- General Secretary of the KKE
  - 1931–1956: Nikos Zachariadis
- Historical era: Cold War
  - Established: 24 December 1947
  - Disestablished: 28 August 1949
- Currency: Greek drachma (₯)
Preceded by	Succeeded by
Kingdom of Greece; Political Committee of National Liberation	Kingdom of Greece
- Today part of: Greece

The Provisional Democratic Government (Greek: Προσωρινή Δημοκρατική Κυβέρνηση, romanized: Prosoriní Dimokratikí Kyvérnisi) was the name of the administration declared by the Communist Party of Greece on 24 December 1947, during the Greek Civil War. The government controlled various mountainous areas along Greece's northern border, adjoining the communist states of SFR Yugoslavia and Albania, and was seen as the succession of the World War II-era "Mountain Government" of the Communist-led EAM-ELAS Resistance movement. Its main allies were the USSR and the Eastern Bloc.

== History ==
The Greek Civil War had broken out in spring 1946, but it was not until June 1947 that the Greek Communists announced their intention to form a separate government. This move was announced by leading Party member Miltiadis Porfyrogennis at the Congress of the French Communist Party, in a move designed to garner publicity and highlight the support of other Communist parties and governments to the Greek Communists' cause. The formation of a separate government was not only a renunciation of any chances of reconciliation with the royal government in Athens, but also implied also a move away from guerrilla warfare towards a more "regular" structure. This was in accordance with the Yugoslav-inspired "Lakes Plan", which envisaged the creation of a regular army of 50,000–60,000 men and the occupation of large parts of northern Greece, ultimately including Greece's second largest city, Thessaloniki, where the new government would base itself.

The new government's formation was announced on 23 December 1947, with Markos Vafiadis, the leader of the Communists' Democratic Army of Greece (DSE), as its first chairman. The government was composed exclusively of Party members, with Giannis Ioannidis serving as Vice Chairman and Foreign minister, Petros Rousos as Justice Minister, Miltiadis Porfyrogennis as Health and Welfare Minister, Petros Kokkalis as Finance Minister, Vassilis Bartziotas as Agriculture Minister, Dimitris Vlantas as Minister of National Economy and Leonidas Stringos as Minister of Supply. Notably, Party General Secretary Nikolaos Zachariadis was not a member of the government. The new government actively tried to present itself as a revival of the ideology and practices of the World War II-era National Liberation Front, which had dominated the Greek Resistance movement. It was also notable for its active protection of the minorities living in northern Greece, especially as these tended to support the Communists against the nationalist royal government.

On 25 December, the DSE attacked the town of Konitsa, intending to seize the city as the new government's headquarters. According to testimony by Vafiadis, Zachariadis had expressed the hope that if the city fell and became the Communists' capital, the PDG would be recognized by the Soviet Union and other Eastern Bloc states. The attack lasted until 4 January 1948, but ended in failure. In the end, the PDG was never recognized by any government, because the Soviets feared a widening of the conflict into general warfare between the West and their satellite states in the Balkans. Soviet premier Joseph Stalin told Zachariadis in February 1948 that the neighbouring governments would only recognize the PDG after other countries had first done so.

As the national government pushed the DSE back in 1948, Vafiadis clashed with Zachariadis over the pursuit of the war. Finally, he was ousted from his position as PDG chairman on 7 February 1949. On 3 April 1949, he was succeeded by Dimitrios Partsalidis. Following defeat by government forces in the Battle of Grammos, the Provisional Democratic Government was defeated in the Civil War and left Greece on 28 August 1949. The PDG survived in exile until they were finally dissolved in October 1950.

== See also ==
- People's Republic
- Mountain Government
