= Nikos Zachariadis =

General Secretary of the Communist Party of Greece from 1931 to 1956

- Νίκος Ζαχαριάδης
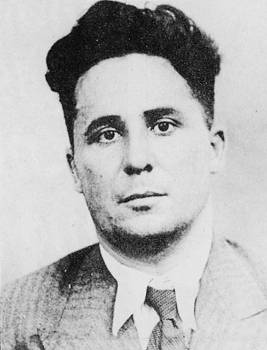
- A photo of Zachariadis, from the 30 May 1945 edition of Rizospastis.

General Secretary of the Communist Party of Greece
- In office 1931–1956
- Preceded by: Andronikos Haitas
- Succeeded by: Apostolos Grozos (temporary)

Personal details
- Born: 27 April 1903 Adrianople, Ottoman Empire (modern-day Edirne, Turkey)
- Died: 1 August 1973 (aged 70) Surgut, RSFSR, Soviet Union (modern-day Russian Federation)
- Resting place: Athens
- Spouse(s): Mania Novakova; Roula Koukoulou (1948 - )
- Children: Kiros, Olga, Sifis
- Parent: Panagiotis Zachariadis (Father)

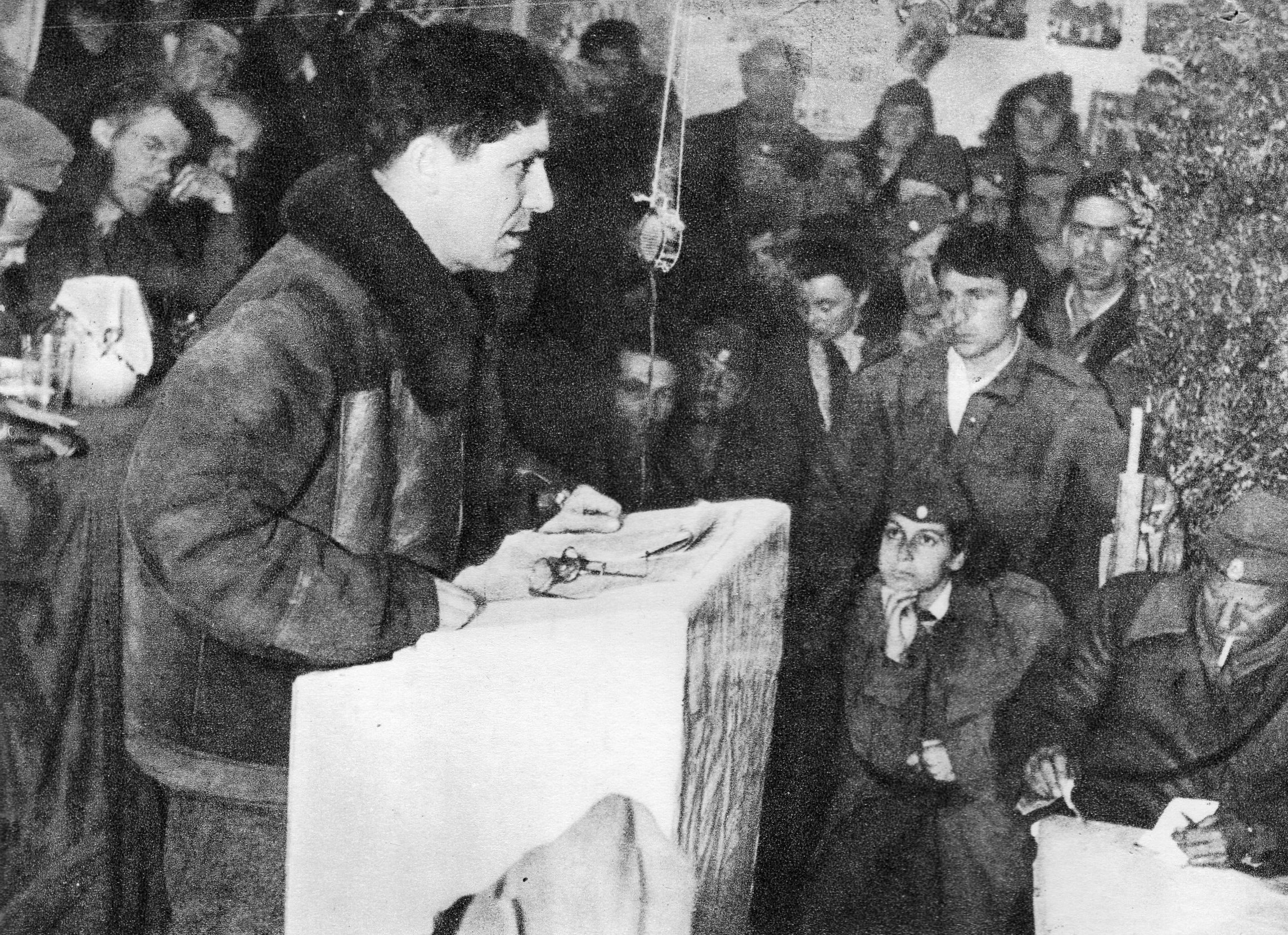
Nikos Zachariadis, president of the Supreme Military Council of Democratic Army of Greece

Nikos Zachariadis (Greek: Νίκος Ζαχαριάδης; 27 April 1903 – 1 August 1973) was a Greek politician and revolutionary who served as the General Secretary of the Communist Party of Greece (KKE) from 1931 to 1956.

In 1931, he assumed the position of Secretary of the Central Committee of the KKE, by order of the Comintern, and he was the General Secretary of the Central Committee from 1935 to 1956.

He was arrested by the Metaxas dictatorship in 1936. From prison, he lent his political influence to a united antifascist front following Italy's invasion of Greece on October 28, 1940. Despite his efforts to encourage unity and resistance in the face of fascist aggression, Zachariadis remained imprisoned and when the Nazis ultimately invaded and occupied Greece in 1941, Zachariadis was transferred to Dachau concentration camp, where he remained until the camp was liberated by the US Army in May 1945.

Along with Markos Vafiadis, Zachariadis was an integral figure in the formation and operations of the KKE-led Democratic Army of Greece (DSE) during the Greek Civil War of 1946–1949. Following the collapse of the military effort in 1949, Zachariadis and other leaders of the DSE retreated to Tashkent, capital city of Uzbek SSR. He continued to receive support as the General Secretary of the "exterior" branch of KKE until the death of Joseph Stalin in 1953.

Zachariadis fell out of favor with the Tashkent branch of KKE in 1955 and, following some infighting, he was removed from his post — ostensibly with the support and approval of Nikita Khrushchev — by May 1956. Zachariadis was expelled from KKE the following year.

Zachariadis spent the rest of his life in exile in Siberia, initially in Yakutia and later in Surgut, where — according to official KGB records — he committed suicide in 1973. His body was returned to Greece in 1991 following the fall of the Soviet Union.

== Early life ==
Nikos Zachariadis was born in Edirne, Adrianople Vilayet, Ottoman Empire, in 1903, to an ethnic Greek family. His father, Panagiotis Zachariadis, was of petty-bourgeois origin and worked as an expert in the Regie Company, a French firm possessing the tobacco monopoly in Turkey.

In 1919, Nikos Zachariadis moved to Constantinople, where he worked in various jobs, including as a soldier. It was there that he carried out his first organized work in the working-class movement. After the defeat of Greece during the Greco-Turkish War and the population exchange between the two countries, the Zachariadis family was forcibly relocated to Greece and fell into poverty. In 1922 to 1923, he traveled to the Soviet Union, where he became a member of the Komsomol. He studied at various political and military institutions of the Soviet government and of the Communist International, including the International Lenin School.

== Political activity in Greece ==
In 1923, he was sent back to Greece to organize the Young Communist League of Greece (OKNE). Imprisoned, he subsequently fled to the Soviet Union. In 1931, he was sent back to Greece to restore order in the highly factionalised KKE. The same year, he was elected Secretary of the KKE. In 1935, during the 7th Congress of the Communist International, he was elected to its executive committee. In the years until 1936, Zachariadis was a successful leader of the KKE by tripling the number of its members, gaining seats in the Greek Parliament and even acquiring control of some labour unions.

In August 1936, he was arrested by the State Security of Ioannis Metaxas's regime and was imprisoned. From prison, he allegedly issued a letter urging all Greeks to resist the Italian invasion of October 1940 and to transform the war into an antifascist war. The Central Committee of the KKE considered that the letter had been fabricated by the Metaxas regime. Zachariadis was even accused of releasing it to win the favour of Konstantinos Maniadakis and to be released from prison. The Comintern also denounced the letter as fake. Zachariadis then wrote a second letter denouncing the war "imperialistic". Indeed, the Molotov–Ribbentrop pact had complicated the Greek Communist Party's (KKE's) commitment to "antifascism" due to the Comintern's demand to avoid provoking Germany. The Greek communists were generally unsure how to react when Italy, an ally of Nazi Germany, invaded Greece in October 1940, leading them to refuse support for the war against "imperialist" Britain after initially offering support to the defense. The situation for the KKE changed when the German invasion of the USSR in June 1941 finally prompted the party to throw itself into resisting the German, Italian, and Bulgarian occupiers.

After the German invasion of Greece in 1941, Nazi Germany transferred him to the Dachau concentration camp from where he was released in May 1945. Returning to Greece, he reassumed the leadership of the KKE from Georgios Siantos, the acting general secretary of the KKE since January 1942. The bloody Dekemvriana had just ended with the communists' defeat. Zachariadis now declared his political intention for the KKE to fight for people's democracy by elections.

On September of 1945, Zachariadis wrote an article that was published in Rizospastis titled Orthodoxy. In it, he criticized the "spiritual, political and economic expansion and enforcement of the Western Roman State and of Catholicism-Papism," writing that the triumph of Orthodoxy in the peoples of the East corresponds historically to the reaction against that expansion, and also writing that Orthodoxy "ideologically-spiritually corresponds to a people's attitude, in an internal mental bond that the European cosmopolitan calls "Eastern spirit" and the disgraced and degenerate levantine despises, but it concentrates and expresses internal popular unity and expresses superior ideals and charisms."

== Civil War ==
Zachariadis conducted the military operations of the communist Democratic Army of Greece, which was formed to install a socialist people's democracy in Greece.

He ordered the ELAS commander Markos Vafiadis to abandon guerrilla warfare tactics and adopt a strategy of conventional warfare. According to Vafiadis, that had a strongly negative effect on ELAS. Vafiadis was expelled from the KKE for challenging Zachariadis and kept under house arrest in Albania, accused of being a British agent.

However, Joseph Stalin had made a deal with the Western Allies that Greece would be considered part of the western sphere of influence after the war and was opposed officially to any communist seizure of power. He ordered the KKE leadership to co-operate with the British when it landed in Greece in 1944 and refused to supply any assistance to the KKE when they took up arms against the Greek government and their British allies.

Josip Broz Tito's Yugoslavia initially supported the KKE but withdrew the support after the break between Tito and Stalin in 1948. The military intervention of the United Kingdom and the United States, combined with the lack of external support from Stalin or Tito, led to the defeat of the Democratic Army of Greece in 1949. The KKE leadership and the remnants of the Democratic Army fled into exile to the Soviet Union and other communist countries.

== Post-war life and legacy ==
The leadership of the Communist Party found refuge in Tashkent. However, after Stalin's death in 1953, Zachariadis clashed with the new Soviet leadership, as he opposed the new direction taken by the Soviet Communist Party under Nikita Khrushchev .

In May 1956, during the Sixth Plenum of the Central Committee of the KKE, the Soviet Communist Party intervened to expel Zachariadis from his post of General Secretary. In February 1957, Zachariadis was also expelled from the KKE, as were many of his supporters.

Zachariadis spent the rest of his life in exile in Siberia, initially in Yakutia and later in Surgut, Russian SFSR. In 1962, desperate from the devastating conditions of his exile, he somehow managed to reach Moscow. There, he visited the Greek Embassy and asked to be transported to Greece, where he wanted to stand trial for his actions. Whether or not his request was taken into consideration is not known. Immediately after he left the Greek embassy, he was arrested by the Soviets and was taken back to Surgut. There he committed suicide by hanging, aged 70, in 1973. According to a few of his followers, he was executed. On the base of documents, declassified from the archives of the Russian Ministry of Internal Affairs, it has been confirmed that Zachariadis committed suicide.

In December 1991, just a few days after the fall of the Soviet Union, Zachariadis' remains were returned to his homeland of Greece, and he was given a funeral, which gave his supporters the opportunity to honour him. He is buried in the First Cemetery of Athens.

In 2011, a National Conference of the Communist Party of Greece fully rehabilitated Zachariadis as General Secretary of the KKE. That was in line with the KKE's general political reorientation since the collapse of the Soviet Union; the party has adopted the view that the Soviet Communist Party embarked on a revisionist line after Stalin's death and Khrushchev's takeover.
