= National Bands Agreement =

1943 agreement between the United Kingdom and the Greek Resistance

The National Bands Agreement (Greek: Σύμφωνο των Εθνικών Ομάδων) was an agreement concluded on 5 July 1943 at the village of Liaskovo, between the British military mission to occupied Greece and the three main Greek Resistance organizations, EAM-ELAS, EDES and EKKA. Its aim was to coordinate the actions of the Resistance movement in Greece, including the establishment of a joint headquarters under the aegis of the British GHQ Middle East.

The negotiations were begun by the British military mission in March 1943 as an attempt to avoid a repeat of the clashes between the Communist-controlled ELAS, by far the largest armed guerrilla organization, and the other groups. In addition, the British were concerned with presenting the Germans with the real possibility of an Allied invasion of the Balkans, and an increased and coordinated guerrilla effort was vital for this (Operation Animals, cf. also Operation Mincemeat and Operation Barclay).

On 6 June, representatives from ELAS (Colonel Stefanos Sarafis and Andreas Tzimas), EDES (Colonel Napoleon Zervas and Komninos Pyromaglou) and the British mission (Eddie Myers and Christopher Woodhouse) assembled in the village of Liaskovo. The negotiations lasted on-and-off for a month, until the agreement was signed on 5 July. EKKA, which at the time did not have any armed force in the field due to its forcible disarmament by ELAS, signed the agreement on 18 July, represented by Colonel Dimitrios Psarros and Georgios Kartalis. The Panhellenic Liberation Organization (PAO), another nationalist group active in Macedonia but also hostile to ELAS, was also considered for later inclusion.

In the event, the agreed joint headquarters, where ELAS had the majority, failed to coordinate the guerrillas' movements, best evidenced following the capitulation of Italy in September 1943, when each organization tried to get as much as it could from the spoils of the Italian army of occupation. ELAS seized the majority, and clashes between the groups began again in October 1943 with an attack on EDES by ELAS forces.

== Sources ==
- Kousoulas, Dimitrios (1965). Revolution and defeat: the story of the Greek Communist Party. Oxford University Press. pp. 164–168.
- Clogg, Richard (ed.). "British Policy and Resistance Movements in Greece. Report by Major D.J. Wallace on his visit to Greece, 14 July–6 August 1943". Greece, 1940-1949: occupation, resistance, civil war : a documentary history. pp. 117–152.
