= Aris Velouchiotis =

Greek resistance fighter (1905–1945)

- Velouchiotis in Athens after the Liberation (Hotel Grande Bretagne, photo by Dmitri Kessel)
- Born: Athanasios Klaras; August 27, 1905; Lamia, Greece
- Died: June 15, 1945 (aged 39); Mesounta, Arta, Greece
- Cause of death: Suicide by gunshot or hand grenade
- Organization(s): National Liberation Front; Greek People's Liberation Army
- Political party: Communist Party of Greece

Athanasios Klaras (Greek: Αθανάσιος Κλάρας; August 27, 1905 – June 15, 1945), better known by the nom de guerre Aris Velouchiotis (Άρης Βελουχιώτης), was a Greek journalist and politician. He was a member of the Communist Party of Greece and the most prominent leader and chief instigator of the Greek People's Liberation Army (ELAS), the military branch of the National Liberation Front (EAM), which was the major resistance organization in occupied Greece from 1942 to 1945.

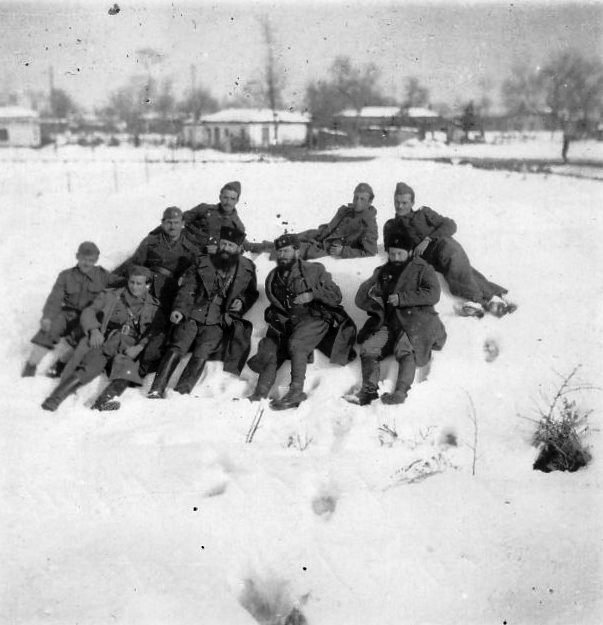
Velouchiotis, to the left, with officers of ELAS

== Early years ==
"If there is a moment in my life which I see with pride is when I entered the communist party.......It is honour for me and the communist party, because I survived from the corruption of my consciousness and I adorned Klaras, who was a lost case, with only pure revolutionary characteristics."

— From a letter of Klaras to Rizospastis, 1931

Athanasios Klaras was born in Lamia, Greece in 1905, to an urban upper-class family of Aromanian origin. His father was Dimitrios Klaras, a well-known lawyer in the area and his mother was Aglaia Zerva. Initially, Klaras studied journalism, but later attended and graduated from the Geoponic School of Larissa. He left for Athens, where he did various jobs, participated in the leftist and antimilitary movement and later became a member of the Communist Party of Greece (KKE). During the 1920s and 1930s he was jailed several times for different offenses.

He became an editor in the communist Rizospastis and wrote several articles supporting socialist revolution. In 1931, an article by Klaras caused the intervention of the government, who shut down the newspaper and prosecuted its editors. The newspaper was republished as Neos Rizospastis.

During the Metaxas regime (1936–1941), there was an "unprecedented witch-hunt" against Greek communists. Velouchiotis was arrested for his communist ideas at the end of 1936 and jailed in Aegina, where he was tortured under the police interrogation techniques refined by Konstantinos Maniadakis, the minister of security. He managed to escape during transport from Aegina to Athens for trial in 1937, but was arrested soon thereafter and sent back to Aegina for an additional four years. He remained imprisoned there until signing a "statement of renouncement of KKE and of the communist ideology," a very humiliating act for a communist at the time. These "declarations of repentance" were then distributed to the authorities in the signatory's home village. These confessions were often publicly published listing both the actions for which the signatory had confessed, as well as wholly fabricated confessions, marking the signatories as dilosias (renegades) in their home villages. This left a mark on Velouchiotis' name, both with those supporting the Metaxas dictatorship, but also from the communists, who saw his declaration as a capitulation.

== World War II: From Klaras to Aris ==
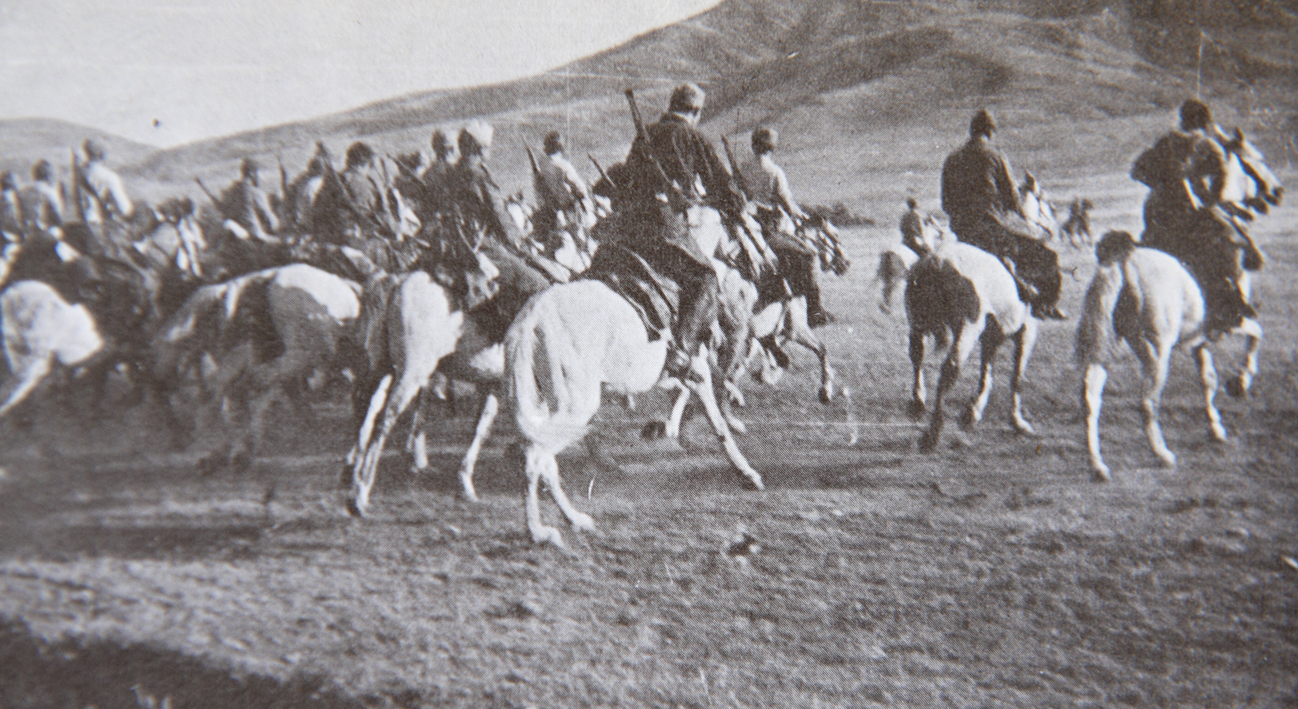
Cavalry of ELAS

During World War II, Klaras fought as an artillery private of the Hellenic Army at the Albanian front against the Italian Army, until the German invasion in April 1941 and Greece's subsequent surrender and occupation.

After Germany's offensive campaign in the Soviet Union, the Greek Communist Party championed the creation of the National Liberation Front (EAM), and Klaras was sent to Roumeli to assess the potential for the development of a guerrilla movement against the occupation forces in this area. His proposals were adopted by the party, and in January 1942, Klaras moved to the mountains to start setting up guerrilla groups.

The first appearance of the partisans organised by Klaras occurred on June 7, 1942, in the village of Domnista in Evrytania in Central Greece. There he presented himself as Major of Artillery (in hopes of gaining extra prestige among the villagers) with the nom de guerre of Aris Velouchiotis (from Ares, the Greek god of war, and Velouchi, a local mountain) and proclaimed the existence of the Greek People's Liberation Army (ELAS). Initially, he collected also the traditional local mountain bandits in order to create a small group of experts in guerrilla fighting. Velouchiotis as a leader applied steely discipline and managed to have under his commands a considerable number of guerillas. Starting with only 15 men, ELAS' power finally comprised up to 50,000 guerillas.

One of the most important early operations of the Greek resistance movement (in which Velouchiotis and his fighters, after negotiations with the British, agreed to participate alongside Napoleon Zervas's republican EDES resistance forces and twelve British saboteurs under the leadership of Major E. C. W. "Eddie" Myers) was the blowing-up of the Gorgopotamos railway viaduct, south of Lamia, on November 25, 1942 (Operation Harling). The destruction of the viaduct cut the single Thessaloniki-Athens rail line, thus the line connecting the Balkans with southern Greece, but did not disrupt any supply lines—as would have been the case had it happened, as the British intended, two months earlier—to Erwin Rommel's German forces in Northern Africa, as it took place one month after the commencement of the El Alamein battle on October 23, 1942, in which Rommel was badly defeated by the British.

The destruction of the Gorgopotamos viaduct was to be the last operation where the communist-influenced ELAS organization fought alongside Greek Republican resistance forces, such as the EKKA's 5/42 Evzones Regiment (military arm of EKKA) and EOEA (National Groups of Greek Guerillas, Εthnikes Omades Ellinon Antarton, military arm of EDES). But despite the signing of an agreement in July 1943 between the three main Resistance groups (EAM/ELAS, EDES and EKKA) to cooperate and to subject themselves to the Allied Middle East High Command under General Wilson (the "National Bands Agreement"), in the political field, the mutual mistrust between EAM and the other groups escalated. EAM-ELAS was by now the dominant political and military force in Greece, and EDES and EKKA, along with the British and the Greek government-in-exile, feared that after the inevitable German withdrawal, it would try to dominate the country and establish a soviet regime. The rift ultimately led to a civil war in late 1943 and early 1944, in which ELAS attacked EDES, EOEA and destroyed EKKA's 5/42 Evzones Regiment, executing its leader Col. Dimitrios Psarros.

== Liberation ==
Velouchiotis talks in Lamia after the withdrawal of the Axis powers.

"Who therefore is a patriot? They or us? Capital doesn't have a country and seeks profit in whatever country it is able to. That is why it isn't concerned for the existence of borders and the state. But all we own are our hats and the small kerb in front of us ...So, who can be interested more in their country? They, who remove the capital from the country, or us who are stuck on our doorsteps here?"

— From Velouchiotis speech in Lamia

In October 1944, when the Nazis evacuated Greece, ELAS was the dominant force in most of the Greek cities, except Athens, while EAM had established its own government, the Political Committee of National Liberation (PEEA).

Velouchiotis passed from Roúmeli to Peloponnese to clear the region from the Security Battalions, and fought several battles against them.

The British, with units of the Greek Army, were landed in Greece (Operation Manna) and a new government was formed under Georgios Papandreou, the leader of the Greek National Unity Government, which was established following the Treaties of Lebanon and Caserta. Velouchiotis returned to Central Greece and made a speech in his native town, Lamia.

== Varkiza Agreement ==
During the Dekemvriana events in Athens, he was sent by the Party to Epirus, where he attacked the forces of Zervas' EDES, which evacuated the region of Epirus and passed to the Ionian islands.

When the Varkiza Agreement was signed to end the fighting between EAM forces and governmental and British forces in Athens, he personally with General Sarafis signed the demobilization of the ELAS army. However, afterwards, he vehemently refused to comply with the agreement, which he regarded as a betrayal of the guerillas.

The leadership of the Communist Party, under Nikos Zachariadis, consequently accused him of treachery and of being a "suspicious and adventurous element" and spurned him as a member of KKE. The leadership of the Communist Party was suspicious of Velouchiotis's actions even though he had been the founder of ELAS because of his status as a simple party member, his old renouncement of the party and his fickle character.

== Death ==
Velouchiotis moved again to the mountains of Central Greece in order to start an insurgency against the new government and the British allies who supported them. He was reported to have denounced the sell-out to the British in the Varkiza Agreement to lay down the National Resistance arms; particularly moving was the sight of his elite massed Mavroskoufides (Black Berets) openly mourning. He was outmaneuvered by the KKE leadership and resolved to leave Greece; he repeatedly requested permission from the party to be allowed to depart, but was refused.

His intention was to create a new ELAS and a National Independence Front (MEA). Though most of his associates abandoned him, he was reported to have continued to conduct guerrilla activities until June 1945. He was denounced by the KKE Central Committee and increasingly isolated, until he was ambushed with his unit in the mountain of Agrafa by paramilitary groups controlled by the Athens government. Aris and his second in command, Giannis Aggeletos (nom de guerre: Leon Tzavellas), were isolated by the main unit, and finally, he committed suicide with his comrade, either by a hand grenade or by a bullet, on the same day he learned that he was denounced by the communist party. Rumours were that he wanted to "have committed suicide with his commander Tzavellas when his thoughts were that there is no better future for his revolution".

The heads of Velouchiotis (right) and Tzavellas, exposed in the central square of the town of Trikala.

The corpses of Velouchiotis and Tzavellas were subsequently decapitated, and the heads displayed (a practice of the pre-war Greek State and Police for the common mountain bandits), hanging from a lamp post in the central square of the town of Trikala. When British Labour government members of Parliament objected to the barbarity of the operation, they received the reply that the display was in accordance to an "ancient Greek war custom".

== Personal life ==
According to Germanos Dimakos, Velouchiotis did not have a "sacramental life, perhaps influenced by his readings" but "never said a bad word about the church and respected tradition." Furthermore, according to Dimakos, Velouchiotis regularly went to church and, a day before Velouchiotis' name day, even asked him to go to church, which they did on his name day.

== Legacy ==
Velouchiotis is one of the most controversial figures of modern Greek history. His personality and action was mythologized during his life and after his death. Supporters consider him a symbol of Greek resistance against the occupying powers, the founder and creator of the biggest guerrilla army in the Greek history (ELAS) and a hero of the communist cause. He was especially strict to Greeks who sought collaboration with the occupying forces, with his companions who broke the organized discipline, and people who approved the involvement of the British in Greek politics, since he considered the British a threat to the patriotic cause of the Resistance.

Following the rehabilitation in Greece of KKE and subsequently of the EAM-ELAS itself after the Metapolitefsi, busts and statues of Aris Velouchiotis have been erected in his native town and other places in Greece. In 2011 KKE proceeded to the official political restoration of Velouchiotis.

== See also ==
- Partisans (military)
- The 200 of Kaisariani
- Democratic Army of Greece
- Percentages agreement
- Greek Civil War
- Che Guevara
- Emiliano Zapata
