= 1946 Greek referendum =

1946 referendum in Greece on maintaining the monarchy; passed

- 1 September 1946

Results
Choice	Votes	%
Yes	1,136,289	68.41%
No	524,771	31.59%
Valid votes	1,661,060	99.77%
Invalid or blank votes	3,860	0.23%
Total votes	1,664,920	100.00%
Registered voters/turnout	1,921,725	86.64%

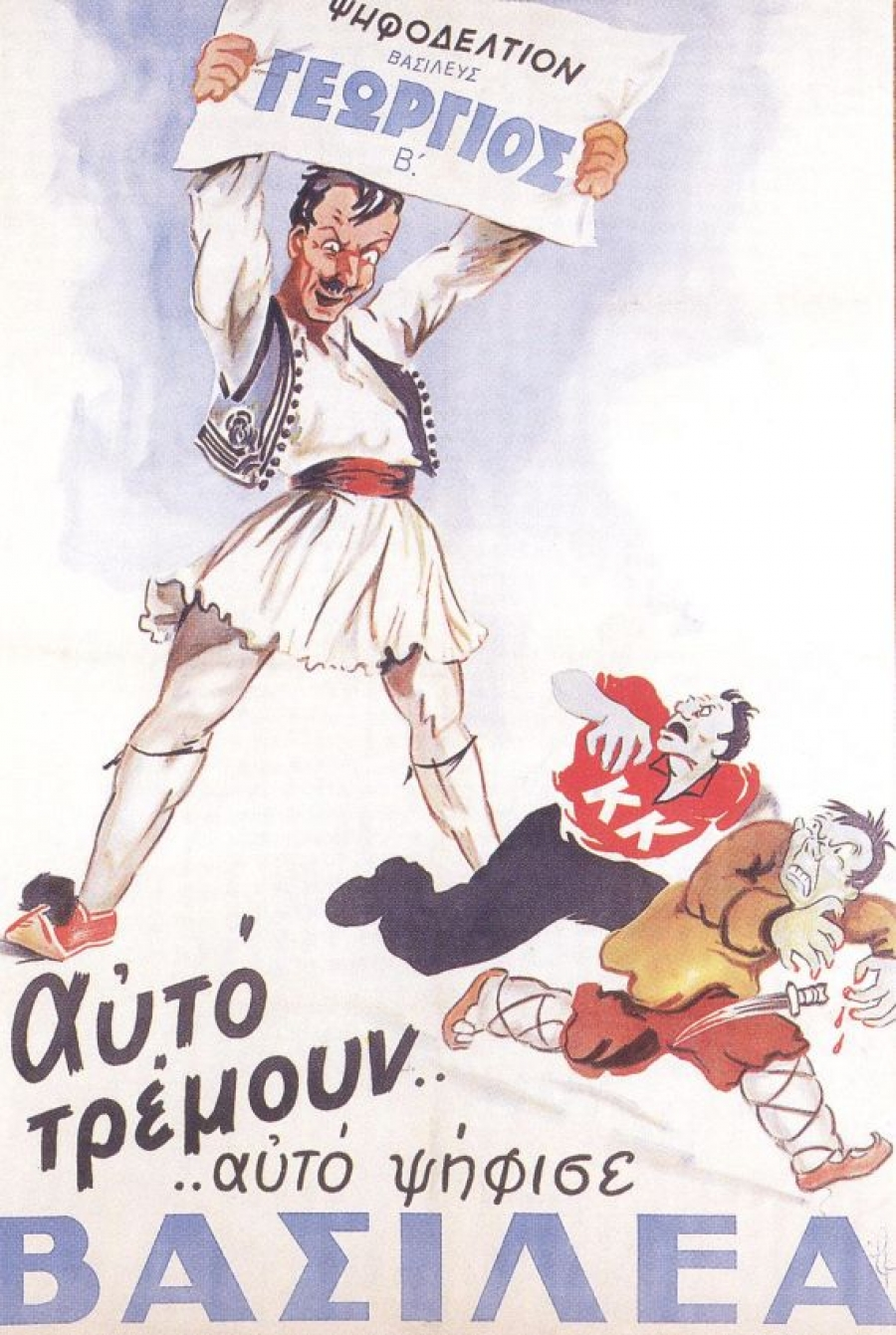
Anti-communist poster during the referendum in favour of George II: "This is what they fear! Vote for the King!"

A referendum on maintaining the monarchy was held in Greece on 1 September 1946. The proposal was approved by 68.4% of voters with a turnout of 88.6%.

== Background ==
The referendum was the fourth since 1920 on the country's monarchy. The 1946 parliamentary elections, in which the right-wing parties achieved a landslide, had just taken place. The new conservative government of Konstantinos Tsaldaris was favorable to George II, but what influenced the result more was the atmosphere of imminent civil war.

The civil war convulsed Greece during two main periods: first between 1943 and 1944 between the KKE-dominated EAM/ELAS partisans and the right-wing resistance groups and the internationally recognized Greek government-in-exile which had returned to the country in November 1944 and later in 1946–1949. The collaborationist government collapsed after the Germans had left, and all of its leaders were in custody. EAM/ELAS, which controlled much of the countryside, expected to take over until it realized that Stalin had conceded Greece to the British at Yalta. It believed that it was essential to seize control of the capital and to create "facts on the ground." EAM/ELAS heavily outnumbered and outgunned government forces and came within a hair's breadth of success. Churchill moved quickly to transfer two British divisions from Italy, and after a month of fighting, they decisively defeated the Greek communists.

The referendum took place, after EAM/ELAS had been defeated in the Dekemvriana. Although it had agreed to disarm at the Treaty of Varkiza, in January 1945, it surrendered only a few token weapons and withdrew into the mountainous areas of Greece, where it had effective control. In retaliation for the Red Terror, right-wing groups, often with the tacit support of the security forces, persecuted communists in areas not under communist control, the White Terror. This deepened the gulf between the left-wing and the centrist and right-wing parties and polarised the political spectrum so that the centrist parties, which followed a more moderate but also a more ambiguous policy, lost part of their power.

The KKE boycotted both the elections and the referendum and instead launched the second phase of the civil war. It prevented any voting in areas that it controlled. George II symbolized the unity of the anti-communist forces, which partly explains the percentage of votes in his favour. The conservatives, along with Prime Minister Konstantinos Tsaldaris, supported him, but the centrists were divided. The centrists regarded George II with displeasure but reacted with disgust at the savagery of the communists.

The official report of the Allied Mission to Observe the Greek Elections [AMFOGE] acknowledged the existence of voter fraud despite its vested interest in legitimising the election: "There is no doubt in our minds that the party representing the government view exercised undue influence in securing votes in support of the return of the King". It, however, claimed that without the said influence, the monarchy would still have prevailed in the election.

== Results ==
Choice	Votes	%
For	1,136,289	68.4
Against	524,771	31.6
Invalid/blank votes	3,860	0.2
Total	1,664,920	100
Registered voters/turnout	1,921,725	86.6
Source: Nohlen & Stöver
