= White Terror (Greece) =

Anti-Communist repression period in Greece 1945–1946

- Native name: Λευκή Τρομοκρατία
- Location: Kingdom of Greece
- Date: February 1945–March 1946
- Target: Leftists
- Attack type: Politicide, mass murder
- Deaths: 1,289
- Victims: 6,681 injured, 32,632 tortured, 84,939 arrested
- Perpetrator: Right-wing terror groups
- Motive: Anti-communism

In Greece, the White Terror (Greek: Λευκή Τρομοκρατία) was the period of persecution of members of the Communist Party of Greece (KKE) and other former members of the leftist World War II-era resistance organization National Liberation Front (EAM) in 1945–1946, prior to the outbreak of the Greek Civil War. The term is used in Greece in an analogy to similar cases elsewhere.

== Background ==
During the Axis occupation of Greece, the communist-dominated EAM-ELAS had become the major organization within the Greek Resistance movement. By the summer of 1944, with an estimated membership of between half and two million, and disposing of some 150,000 fighters, it dwarfed its nearest non-communist rivals, EDES and EKKA. Mounting tensions between itself and the other rival groups, sparked by ideology as well as EAM-ELAS' ambition to be the sole instrument of "national liberation", led to repeated clashes in 1943–44, in what was later termed the "first phase" of the Civil War.

At the time of Greece's liberation in October 1944, EAM-ELAS dominated the country except for the major cities, especially Athens, where British forces supported the returned Greek government in exile. A new government of national unity headed by Georgios Papandreou was established in Greece, with the participation of EAM and KKE, according to the Caserta Agreement. The internal disagreements of the government resulted in the withdrawal of the EAM ministers. The dormant rivalry between the Papandreou's government, backed by the British, and EAM-ELAS, resulted in the Dekemvriana clashes in Athens (December 1944 – January 1945), where EAM-ELAS was defeated, and the disarmament of the organization in the Treaty of Varkiza (February 1945).

The Varkiza Agreement was never fully implemented as its terms contained many intentional omissions and ambiguities. The government side failed to fulfill its obligations, while rogue members of KKE such as Aris Velouchiotis hid large caches of weaponry in anticipation of future reprisals by the rightists.

== White Terror and outbreak of the Civil War ==
Greek leftists were systematically denied their political and legal rights by the government, facilitating their subsequent persecution. With EAM-ELAS neutralized, its members became easy prey for various right-wing groups in retaliation for the preceding "Red Terror". These ranged from former members of the collaborationist Security Battalions to the government's paramilitary security services, chiefly the Greek Gendarmerie, MAY and the National Guard, acting with the government's tacit support. Thus, as Polymeris Voglis points out, "[w]hereas elsewhere in Europe prisons were flooded with fascists and their collaborators, in Greece most of the prisoners were members of leftist resistance organizations." According to the British Legal Mission in Greece, of the 16,700 prison inmates on 1 October 1945, 7,077 were common law criminals, 6,027 were left-wing prisoners imprisoned after the Dekemvriana, and only 2,896 were collaborators. As of December 1945, 48,956 people were wanted by the Greek authorities due to their affiliation with EAM-ELAS. The campaign of persecution lasted through 1945 and much of 1946, and was a critical element in the radicalization and polarization of the political climate in the country.

By May 1945, the National Guard had established outposts across the entire country, however its numbers were insufficient to maintain order and the Gendarmerie's manpower was likewise depleted during the Dekemvriana. Under those circumstances policing was often carried out by far-right paramilitary forces, most notably Organization X. In areas such as Crete, southern Peloponnese and Thessaly, paramilitary bands outnumbered official security units even beyond 1946. While British involvement in directly supporting far-right paramilitaries remains a controversial issue in Greek historiography and has not been conclusively proven, it is certain that British authorities tolerated their activities and made no effort to prevent the persecution of Greek leftists. Following the Varkiza Agreement, 35 far-right death squads were formed in Central Greece, 35 in Thessaly, 23 in Epirus, 50 in the Peloponnese, 38 in Western Macedonia, and a total of 35 bands operated in Central Macedonia, Eastern Macedonia and Thrace. Death squads also operated on various Greek islands, bringing the total number of paramilitaries to over 230 bands, which numbered 10,000 to 18,000 members in July 1945. After the second party congress of KKE in February 1946, approximately 250 leftist self-defense militias, known as Groups of Democratic Armed Persecuted Fighters (ODEKA), were formed across Greece, totaling some 3,000 men. Most of the militiamen were former ELAS fighters. KKE boycotted the 1946 election, and warfare eventually resumed with the outbreak of the third, or main, phase of the Greek Civil War in spring 1946.

In the period between the Treaty of Varkiza and the 1946 election, right-wing terror squads committed 1,289 murders, 165 rapes, 151 kidnappings and forced disappearances. 6,681 people were injured, 32,632 tortured, 84,939 arrested and 173 women were shaved bald. Following the victory of the United Alignment of Nationalists on 1 April 1946 and until 1 May of the same year, 116 leftists were murdered, 31 injured, 114 tortured, 4 buildings were set aflame and 7 political offices were ransacked.

A characteristic feature of the White Terror was the desecration of the corpse of Aris Velouchiotis and his fellow activist, Leon Tzavellas, whose heads were hung in the central square of Trikala in the summer of 1945.

== See also ==
- Makronisos
- Like Stone Lions at the Gateway into Night
- Internal exile in Greece
- Percentages agreement

== Sources ==
- Alivizatos, Nikos (1995). Οι πολιτικοί θεσμοί σε κρίση 1922-1974. Όψεις της ελληνικής εμπειρίας [Political institutions in crisis 1922-1974. Aspects of the Greek experience] (in Greek). Athens: Themelio. ISBN 960-310-043-9.
- Clogg, Richard (1979). A Short History of Modern Greece. Cambridge University Press. ISBN 0521295173.
- Close, David H. (1995). The Origins of the Greek Civil War. Addison-Wesley Longman. ISBN 0582064716.
- Close, David H. (2000). Ο ελληνικός εμφύλιος πόλεμος, 1943-1950 [The Greek Civil War, 1943-1950] (in Greek). Philistor. ISBN 9789603690160.
- Kamarinos, Aristos (2015). Ο εμφύλιος πόλεμος στη Πελοπόννησο 1946-1949 [The Civil War in the Peloponesse (1946-1949)] (in Greek). Athens: Syghroni Epoxi. ISBN 9789602248720.
- Kyritsis, Nikos (2012). Δημοκρατικός Στρατός Ελλάδας. Ιδρυση - Μονάδες - Αξιωματικοί - Δυνάμεις - Απώλειες - Κοινωνική Σύνθεση [Democratic Army of Greece. Creation – Units – Officers – Strength – Casualties – Social Structure] (in Greek). Athens: Syghroni Epoxi. ISBN 978-960-451-146-4.
- Rajak, Svetoslav (2010). "The Cold War in the Balkans, 1945–1956". In Leffler, Melvyn P.; Westad, Odd Arne (eds.). The Cambridge History of the Cold War, Volume I. Cambridge University Press. pp. 198–220. ISBN 978-0521837194.
- Margaris, Nikos (1966). Η Ιστορία της Μακρονήσου [The History of Makronisos] (in Greek). Vol. I. Athens: Papadopoulos and Co.
- Margaritis, Giorgos (2005). Ιστορία του ελληνικού εμφυλίου πολέμου 1946-1949 [History of the Greek Civil War 1946-1949] (in Greek). Vol. I. Athens: Vivliorama. ISBN 9608087120.
- Stavrakis, Peter J. (1989). Moscow and Greek Communism, 1944-1949. Cornell University Press. ISBN 080142125X.
- Tucker, Spencer C. (2013). Encyclopedia of Insurgency and Counterinsurgency: A New Era of Modern Warfare. ABC-CLIO. ISBN 978-1610692809.
- Voglis, Polymeris (2004). "Becoming Communist: Political Prisoners as a Subject during Greek Civil War". In Carabott, Philip; Sfikas, Thanasis D. (eds.). The Greek Civil War: Essays on a Conflict of Exceptionalism and Silences. Ashgate Publishing, Ltd. pp. 141–158. ISBN 0754641317.
