= Germanos Dimakos =

Greek monk and Resistance member (1912–2004)

- Papa-Anypomonos in the mountains with ELAS. Well-known photo taken by Spyros Meletzis.
- Church: Church of Greece

Orders
- Ordination: 29 July 1934 (Deacon)

Personal details
- Denomination: Eastern Orthodox Church

Germanos Dimakos (Greek: Γερμανός Δημάκoς, 1912–2004) was a Greek revolutionary, Hieromonk, and a prominent member of the Greek Resistance during World War II, fighting in the ranks of the Greek People's Liberation Army (ELAS). He is best known by his nom de guerre, Papa-Anypomonos (Παπα-Ανυπόμονος, "Father Impatient").

He was born Georgios Dimakos in 1912, in the village of Agrydaki in Gortynia. He was ordained a deacon on 29 July 1934, adopting the name Germanos. In 1940, when Greece entered World War II, he was the hegumenos of the Agathonos Monastery near Ypati in Phthiotis. After the start of the Axis Occupation of Greece, he became a member of the Communist-sponsored National Liberation Front (EAM), and served as chairman of the community of Dadi. On 14 May 1943 at the village of Koukouvista he met Aris Velouchiotis, the chief captain of ELAS, EAM's guerrilla wing. Henceforth Dimakos became a close associate of Velouchiotis, following him in his tours around Greece. His bravery and zeal earned him the sobriquet Papa-Anypomonos from Velouchiotis himself.

Following the Varkiza agreement of 1945 and the disbandment of ELAS, he returned to the Agathonos Monastery. In 1946, during the "White Terror" preceding the outbreak of the Greek Civil War, he was kidnapped and tortured by a right-wing band. The Regime of the Colonels also persecuted him as a communist sympathizer, and sent him before the Synodical Court in 1968, where he was acquitted. Only during the last years of his life was his role in the Resistance acknowledged and honoured by the Church of Greece. He was interviewed for the 1986 British documentary Greece: The Hidden War. In 2010 the new park of Vytina was named after him.

== Sources ==
- Εφυγε ο παπα-Ανυπόμονος του αντάρτικου. Eleftherotypia (in Greek). 10 June 2004. Archived from the original on 1 December 2011.
- «Εφυγε» ο παπα - Ανυπόμονος (in Greek). Rizospastis. 10 June 2004. Archived from the original on 24 July 2011.
- "Αποκαλυπτήρια ανδριάντα "Κόλλια του Βυτινιώτη" & Εγκαίνια πλατείας "Παπα-Ανυπόμονου"". Vytina Municipality. 2010. Archived from the original on 14 March 2012.
