= Greek resistance =

Armed resistance to the Axis occupation of Greece during WWII

- Part of the Balkans Campaign of World War II and the Resistance against the Axis powers
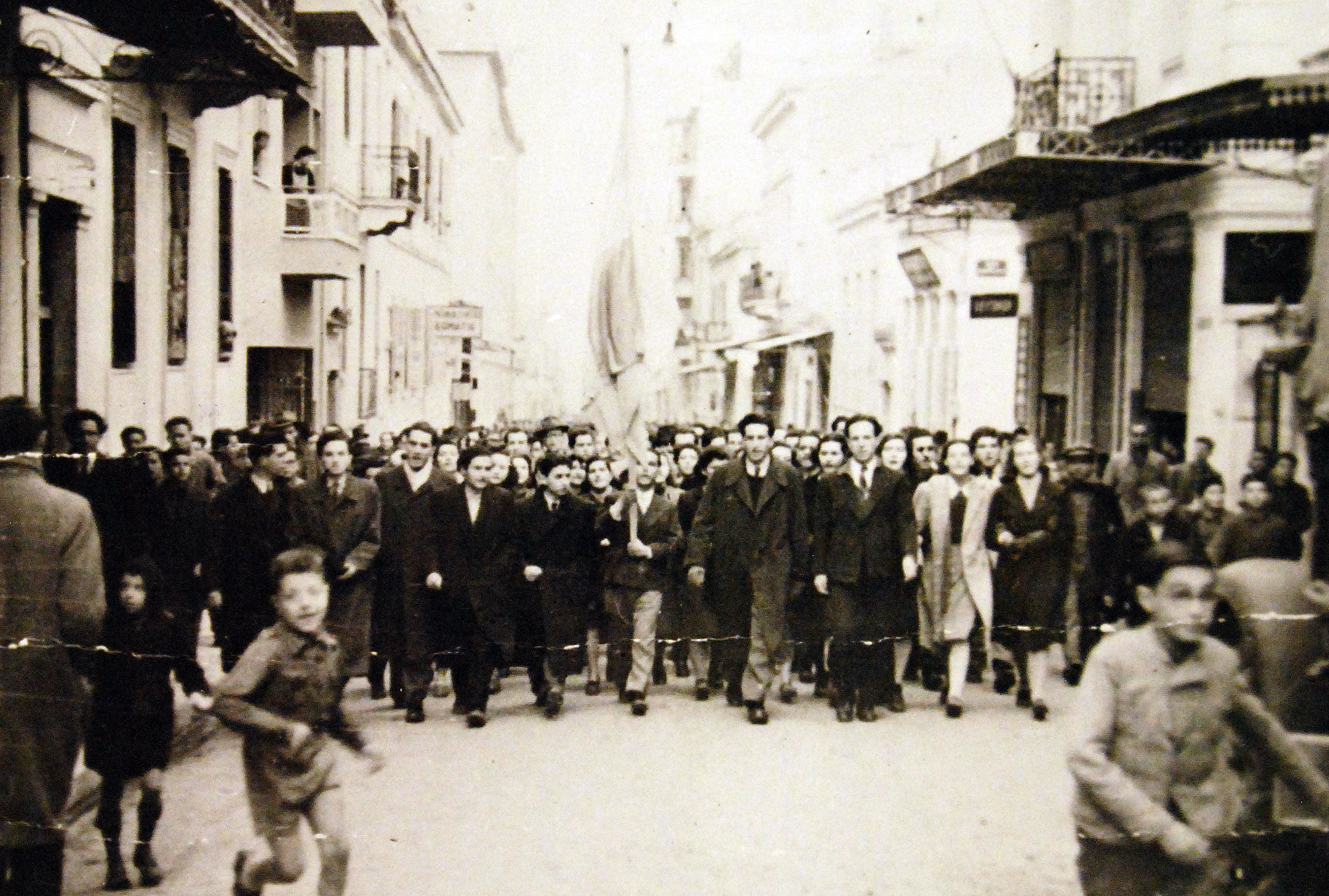
- Athens University students parading on Greek National Independence Day (25 March) 1942, in defiance of the German and Italian occupation forces; the parade was eventually dispersed by Axis troops.
Date	April 1941 – October 1944 (until May 1945 in some Greek islands, including Crete)
Location	Greece
Result	Greek victory; Support to the Allied victory; Liberation in parts of the mainland and establishment of a "Free Greece" in areas controlled by EAM-ELAS; Overall German withdrawal by October 1944; Dekemvriana and first phase of the Greek Civil War

Belligerents
Germany; Italy (until Sep. 1943); Bulgaria (until Sep. 1944) (Greece) Hellenic State; Secessionist groups: Ohrana; Këshilla; Roman Legion (until Sep. 1943)	(Greece) EAM-ELAS-EPON; Supported by: Political Committee of National Liberation (Greece) EDES (Greece) EKKA (Greece) PAO (Greece) EOK and others... Supported by: United Kingdom (SOE) (Greece) Greek government-in-exile

Commanders and leaders
(Nazi Germany) Günther Altenburg (Nazi Germany) Wilhelm List (Nazi Germany) Walter Kuntze (Nazi Germany) Hermann Neubacher (Nazi Germany) Alexander Löhr (Nazi Germany) Walter Schimana (Nazi Germany) Friedrich-Wilhelm Müller (Fascist Italy) Pellegrino Ghigi (Fascist Italy) Carlo Geloso (Fascist Italy) Carlo Vecchiarelli (Fascist Italy) Inigo Campioni (Fascist Italy) Piero Parini (Tsardom of Bulgaria (1908–1946)) Ivan Markov (Tsardom of Bulgaria (1908–1946)) Trifon Trifonov (Tsardom of Bulgaria (1908–1946)) Asen Sirakov (Greece) Georgios Tsolakoglou (Greece) Konstantinos Logothetopoulos (Greece) Ioannis Rallis (Greece) Georgios Bakos (executed) (Greece) Georgios Poulos (executed); Andon Kalchev (executed); Xhemil Dino; Alcibiades Diamandi; Nicolaos Matussis	(Greece) Aris Velouchiotis (Greece) Stefanos Sarafis (Greece) Andreas Tzimas (Greece) Evripidis Bakirtzis (Greece) Alexandros Svolos (Greece) Georgios Siantos (Greece) Napoleon Zervas (Greece) Komninos Pyromaglou (Greece) Dimitrios Psarros (executed) (Greece) Georgios Petrakis (Greece) Georgios Kartalis (Greece) Nikolaos Plastiras (Greece) Kostas Perrikos (executed) (United Kingdom) Eddie Myers (United Kingdom) C.M. Woodhouse (United Kingdom) Patrick Leigh Fermor (United Kingdom) W. Stanley Moss (Greece) Themis Marinos

Strength
A total of 205,000+ men: 100,000 Germans, 40,000 Bulgarians, 40,000 others (1943); 25,000 men of Security Battalions, Poulos Verband etc	(Greece) 50,000–85,000 men of ELAS (1944), from a total of 500,000–750,000 (low estimate according to Anthony Eden) up to 1.5 millions (according to Michael Shafer) members of EAM (1944) (Greece) 5,000 men of EDES (1944) (Greece) 1,500 of EKKA and more

Casualties and losses
(Nazi Germany) 19,000 Germans killed by ELAS; 5,000 Germans killed, (Fascist Italy) 2,739 Italians killed (1,988 killed by ELAS) (Tsardom of Bulgaria (1908–1946)) 1,532 Bulgarians killed (1,305 killed by ELAS); 1,200–5,000 Cham Albanians dead 8,294 injured (in total); 6,463 POW; Unknown number of collaborators 41,270+ total casualties	(Greece) 4,500 ELAS members killed (without including many casualties in Athens, Peloponnese, Crete and Greek Thrace), and 8,000 injured (Greece) 1,500 EDES members killed (Greece) 200 EKKA members killed In total 20,650 partisans killed 10,000 injured (in total) 50,000–70,000 civilians executed c. 65,000 (including 60,000 Jews) were deported, of whom a small number survived 300,000 died during the Great Famine

The Greek resistance (Greek: Εθνική Αντίσταση, romanized: Ethnikí Antístasi, "National Resistance") involved armed and unarmed groups from across the political spectrum that resisted the Axis occupation of Greece in the period 1941–1944, during World War II. The largest group was the Communist-dominated EAM-ELAS. The Greek Resistance is considered one of the strongest resistance movements in Nazi-occupied Europe.

Greek partisans, men and women known as andartes and andartisses (Greek: αντάρτες, αντάρτισσες, romanized: antártes, antártises, meaning "male and female partisans/guerrillas"), controlled much of the countryside prior to the German withdrawal from Greece in late 1944.

== First resistance acts ==
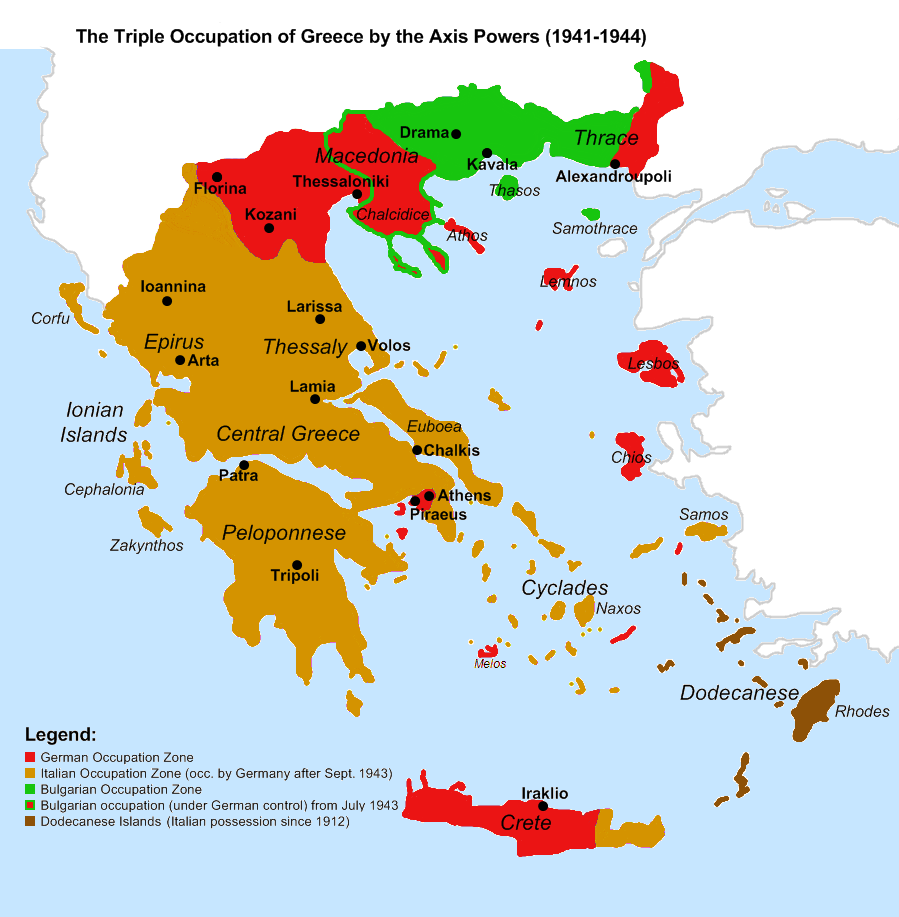
The areas of occupied Greece

The rise of resistance movements in Greece was precipitated by the invasion and occupation of Greece by Nazi Germany (and its allies Italy and Bulgaria) from 1941 to 1944. Italy led the way with its attempted invasion from Albania in 1940, which was repelled by the Greek Army. After the German invasion, the occupation of Athens and the fall of Crete, King George II and his government escaped to Egypt, where they proclaimed a government-in-exile, recognised by the Allies. The British greatly encouraged the King to appoint centrist, moderate ministers; only two of his ministers were members of the dictatorial government that had governed Greece before the German invasion. Despite that, some in the left-wing resistance claimed the government to be illegitimate, on account of its roots in the dictatorship of Ioannis Metaxas from 1936 to 1941.

The Germans set up a collaborationist Greek government, headed by General Georgios Tsolakoglou, before entering Athens. Some high-profile officers of the pre-war Greek regime served the Germans in various posts. This government however, lacked legitimacy and support, being utterly dependent on the German and Italian occupation authorities, and discredited because of its inability to prevent the cession of much of Greek Macedonia and Western Thrace to Bulgaria. Both the collaborationist government and the occupation forces were further undermined due to their failure to prevent the outbreak of the Great Famine, with the mortality rate reaching a peak in the winter of 1941–42, which seriously harmed the Greek civilian population.

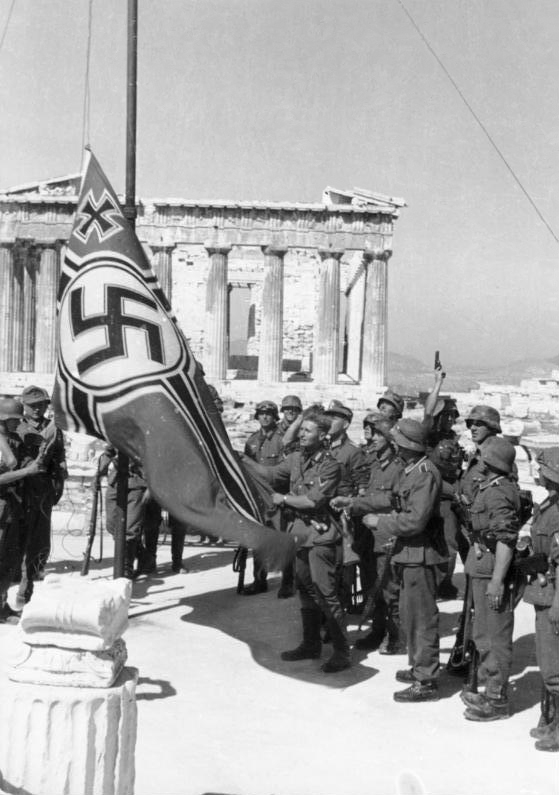
German soldiers raising the German War Flag over the Acropolis of Athens. The symbol of the country's occupation, it would be taken down in one of the first acts of the Greek Resistance.

Although there is an unconfirmed incident connected with Evzone Konstantinos Koukidis the day the Germans occupied Athens, the first confirmed resistance act in Greece had taken place on the night of 30 May 1941, even before the end of the Battle of Crete. Two young students, Apostolos Santas, a law student, and Manolis Glezos, a student at the Athens University of Economics and Business, secretly climbed the northwest face of the Acropolis and tore down the swastika banner which had been placed there by the occupation authorities.

The first wider resistance movements occurred in northern Greece, where the Bulgarians annexed Greek territories. The first mass uprising occurred around the town of Drama in eastern Macedonia, in the Bulgarian occupation zone. The Bulgarian authorities had initiated large-scale Bulgarization policies, causing the Greek population's reaction. During the night of 28–29 September 1941 the people of Drama and its outskirts rose up. This badly-organized revolt was suppressed by the Bulgarian Army, which retaliated executing 300–500 people in Drama alone. An estimated fifteen thousand Greeks were killed by the Bulgarian occupational army during the next few weeks and in the countryside entire villages were machine gunned and looted. The town of Doxato and the village of Choristi are officially considered today Martyr Cities.

At the same time, large demonstrations were organized in Greek Macedonian cities by the Defenders of Northern Greece (YVE), a right-wing organization, in protest against the Bulgarian annexation of Greek territories.

Armed groups consisted of andartes – αντάρτες ("partisans") first appeared in the mountains of Macedonia by October 1941, and the first armed clashes resulted in 488 civilians being murdered in reprisals by the Germans, which succeeded in severely limiting Resistance activity for the next few months. However, these harsh actions, together with the plundering of Greece's natural resources by the Germans, turned Greeks more against the occupiers.

== Establishment of the first resistance groups ==
The lack of a legitimate government and the inactivity of the established political class created a power vacuum and meant an absence of a rallying point for the Greek people. Most officers and citizens who wanted to continue the fight fled to the British-controlled Middle East, and those who remained behind were unsure of their prospects against the Wehrmacht. This situation resulted in the creation of several new groupings, where the pre-war establishment was largely absent, which assumed the role of resisting the occupation powers.

The first resistance groups started appearing a few months after the beginning of the occupation of Greece, such as the Grivas Military Organization, founded in June 1941, and the organization "Freedom", led by Colonel Dimitrios Psarros, founded in July 1941. Also, in June 1941, shortly after the end of the Battle of Crete, the organization "Supreme Committee of Cretan Struggle" (AEAK) was founded. The first major resistance organization to be founded was the National Liberation Front (EAM), which by 1944 came to number more than 1,800,000 members (the Greek population was around 7,500,000 at that time). EAM was organized by the Communist Party of Greece (KKE) and other smaller parties, whereas the major pre-war political parties refused to participate either in EAM or in any other resistance movement. On February 16, 1942, EAM gave permission to a communist veteran, called Athanasios (Thanasis) Klaras (who adopted the nom de guerre Aris Velouchiotis) to examine the possibilities of an armed resistance movement. Although its foundation was announced in late 1941, there were no military acts until 1942, when the Greek People's Liberation Army (ELAS), the armed forces of EAM, was born.

The second largest organization was the Venizelist-oriented National Republican Greek League (EDES), led by a former army officer, Colonel Napoleon Zervas, with exiled republican General Nikolaos Plastiras as its nominal head.

== Resistance in the mountains – Andártiko ==
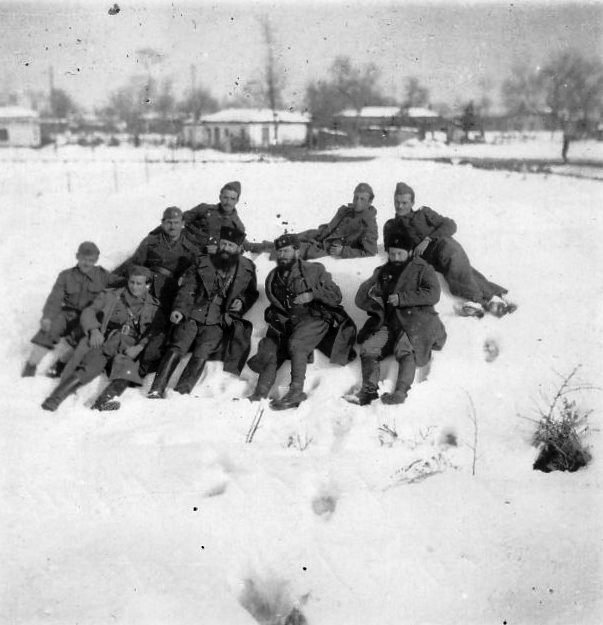
Aris Velouchiotis, to the left, with officers of ELAS

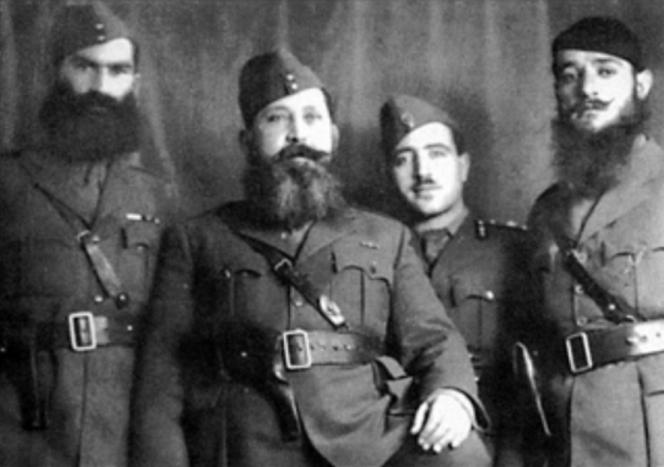
Napoleon Zervas, leader of the military wing of the EDES, with fellow officers

Greece is a mountainous country, with a long tradition in andartiko (αντάρτικο, "guerrilla warfare"), dating back to the days of the klephts (anti-Turkish bandits) of the Ottoman period, who often enjoyed folk-hero status. In the 1940s, the countryside was poor, the road network not very well developed, and state control outside the cities usually exercised by the Greek Gendarmerie. But by 1942, due to the weakness of the central government in Athens, the countryside was gradually slipping out of its control, while the Resistance groups had acquired a firm and wide-ranging organization, parallel and more effective than that of the official state.

=== Emergence of the armed resistance ===
In February 1942, EAM, an organization controlled by the local Communist Party formed a military corps, ELAS, that would first operate in the mountains of Central Greece, with Aris Velouchiotis, a communist activist, as their chief captain. Later, on 28 July 1942, a centrist ex-army officer, Colonel Napoleon Zervas, announced the foundation of the National Groups of Greek Guerrillas (EOEA), as EDES' military arm, to operate, at first, in the region of Aetolia-Acarnania. National and Social Liberation (EKKA) also formed a military corps, named after the famous 5/42 Evzone Regiment, under Col. Dimitrios Psarros, that was mainly localized in the area of Mount Giona.

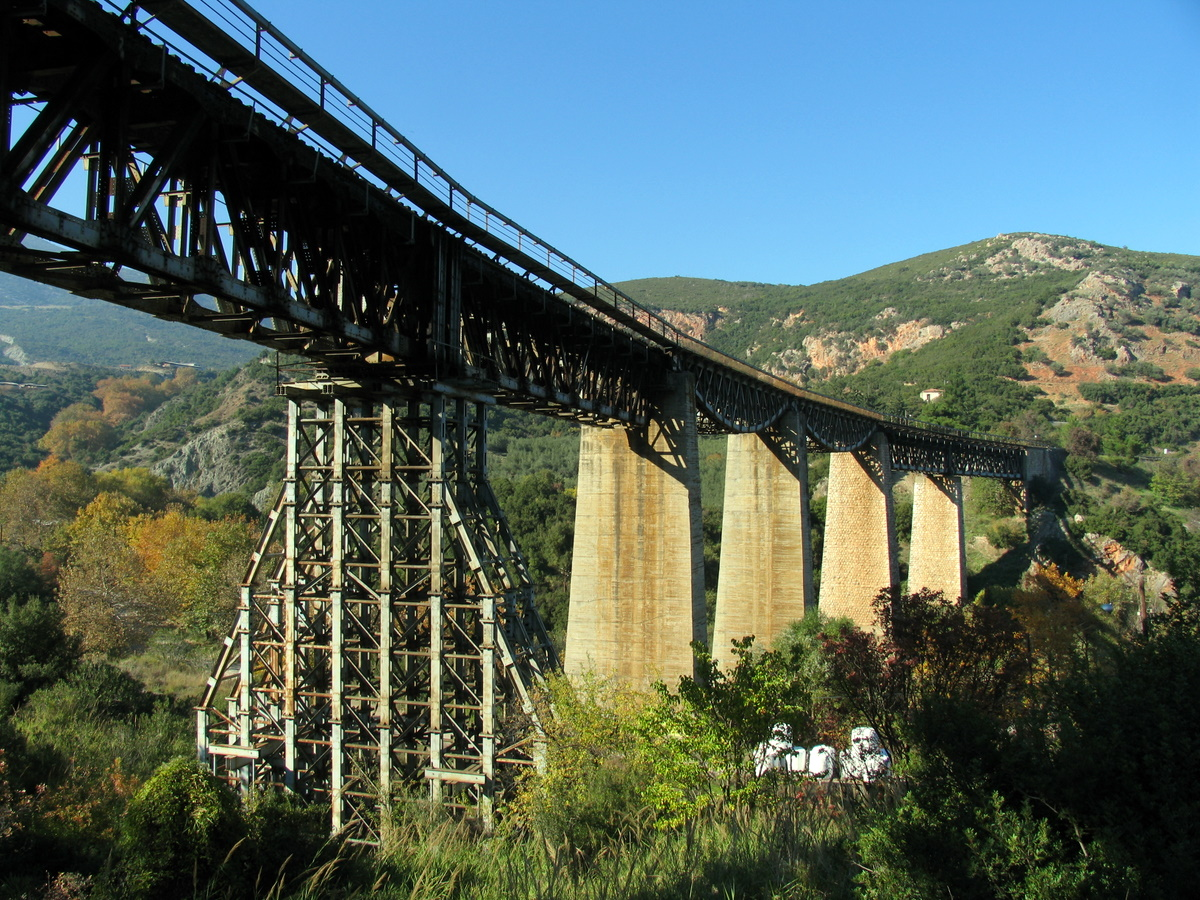
The rail bridge over Gorgopotamos that was blown up (Operation Harling).

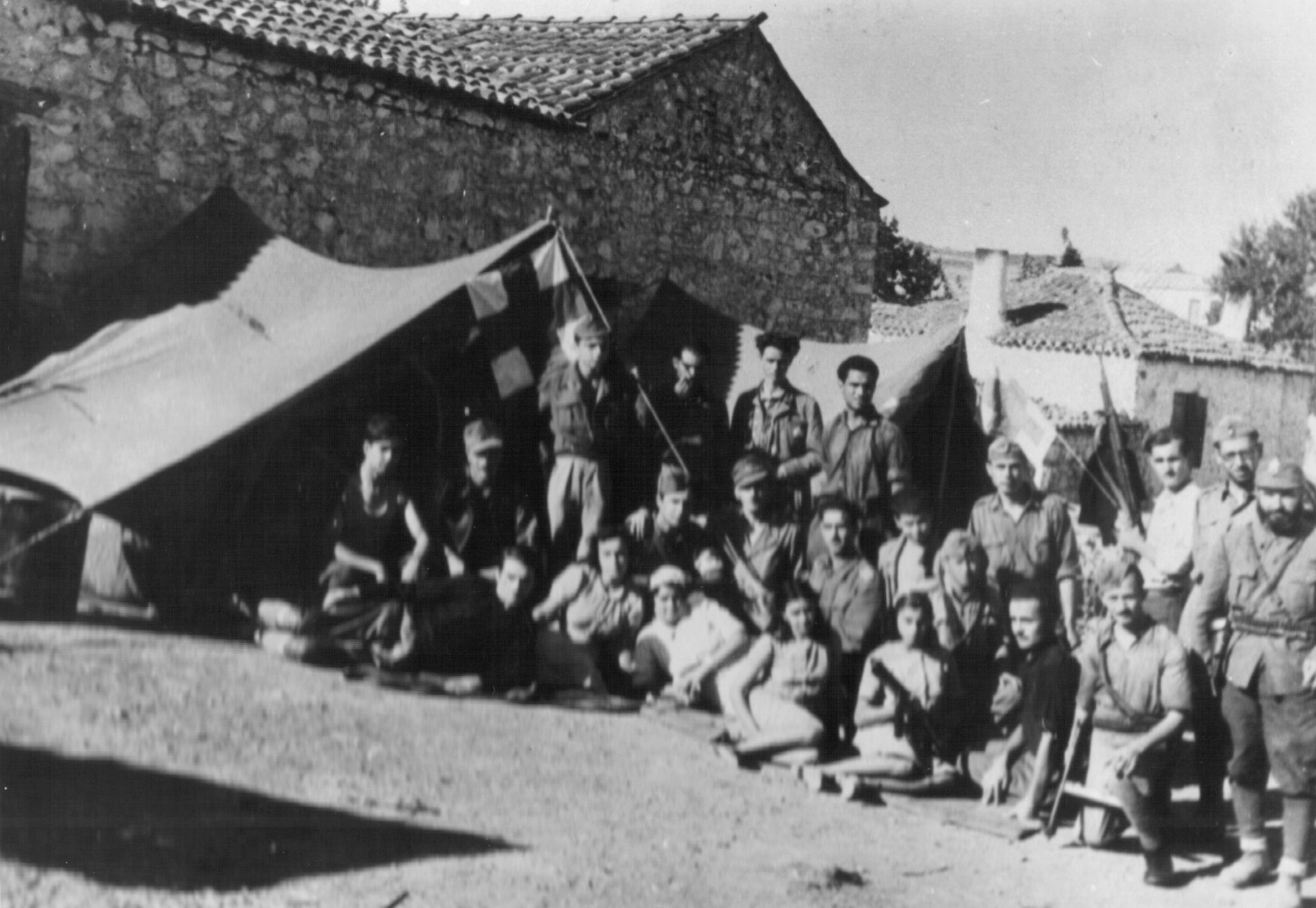
View of a guerrilla hospital

Until the summer of 1942, the occupation authorities had been little troubled by the armed Resistance, which was still in its infancy. The Italians in particular, in control of most of the countryside, considered the situation to have been normalized. From that point, however, the Resistance gained pace, with EAM/ELAS, in particular, expanding rapidly. Armed groups attacked and disarmed local gendarmerie stations and isolated Italian outposts, or toured the villages and gave patriotic speeches. The Italians were forced to re-evaluate their assessment, and take measures such as the deportation of army officers to camps in Italy and Germany, which naturally only encouraged the latter to join the underground en masse by escaping "to the mountains".

These developments emerged most dramatically as the Greek Resistance announced its presence to the world with one of the war's most spectacular sabotage acts, the blowing up of the Gorgopotamos railway bridge, linking northern and southern Greece, on 25 November 1942. This operation was the result of British mediation between ELAS and EDES (Operation "Harling"), carried out by 12 British Special Operations Executive (SOE) saboteurs and a joint ELAS-EDES force. This was the first and last time that the two major Resistance groups would cooperate, due to the rapidly developing rivalry and ideological retrenchment between them.

=== Establishment of "Free Greece" ===
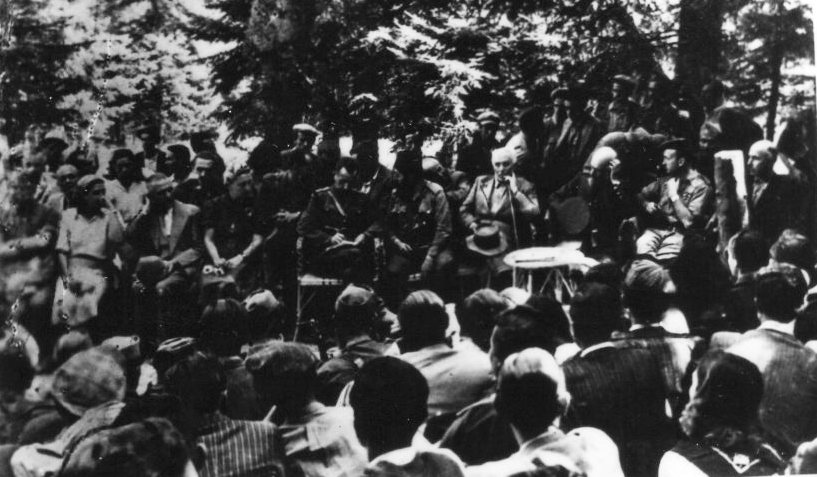
Conference of EAM in Kastanitsa, Thessaly

Nevertheless, constant attacks and acts of sabotage followed against the Italians, such as the Battle of Fardykampos, resulting in the capture of several hundred Italian soldiers and significant amounts of equipment. By the late spring of 1943, the Italians were forced to withdraw from several areas. The towns of Karditsa, Grevena, Trikkala, Metsovon and others were liberated by July. The Axis forces and their collaborators remained in control only of the main towns and the connecting roads, with the interior left to the andartes. This was "Free Greece", stretching from the Ionian Sea to the Aegean Sea and from the borders of the German zone in Macedonia to Boeotia, a territory of 30,000 km^{2} and 750,000 inhabitants.

== Italian collapse and German takeover ==
By this time (July 1943), the overall strength of the andartes was around 20–30,000, with most belonging to the ELAS, newly under the command of General Stefanos Sarafis. EDES was limited in operations to Epirus, and EKKA operated in a small area in Central Greece. The Italian capitulation in September 1943 provided a windfall for the Resistance, as the Italian Army in many places simply disintegrated. Most Italian troops were swiftly disarmed and interned by the Germans, but on Cephalonia the Acqui Division (comprising 11,700 men) resisted for about a week (Greek ELAS partisans joining them) before being forced to surrender. Subsequently 5000 of them were summarily executed. Another 3,000 perished when the ships Sinfra, Mario Roselli and Ardena, that were carrying them to mainland Greece, were sunk by Allied air raids and sea mines in the Adriatic. In many other places significant amounts of Italian weaponry and equipment, as well as men, fell into the hands of the Resistance. The most spectacular case was that of the Pinerolo division and the Lancieri di Aosta Cavalry Regiment, which went completely over to the EAMite andartes.

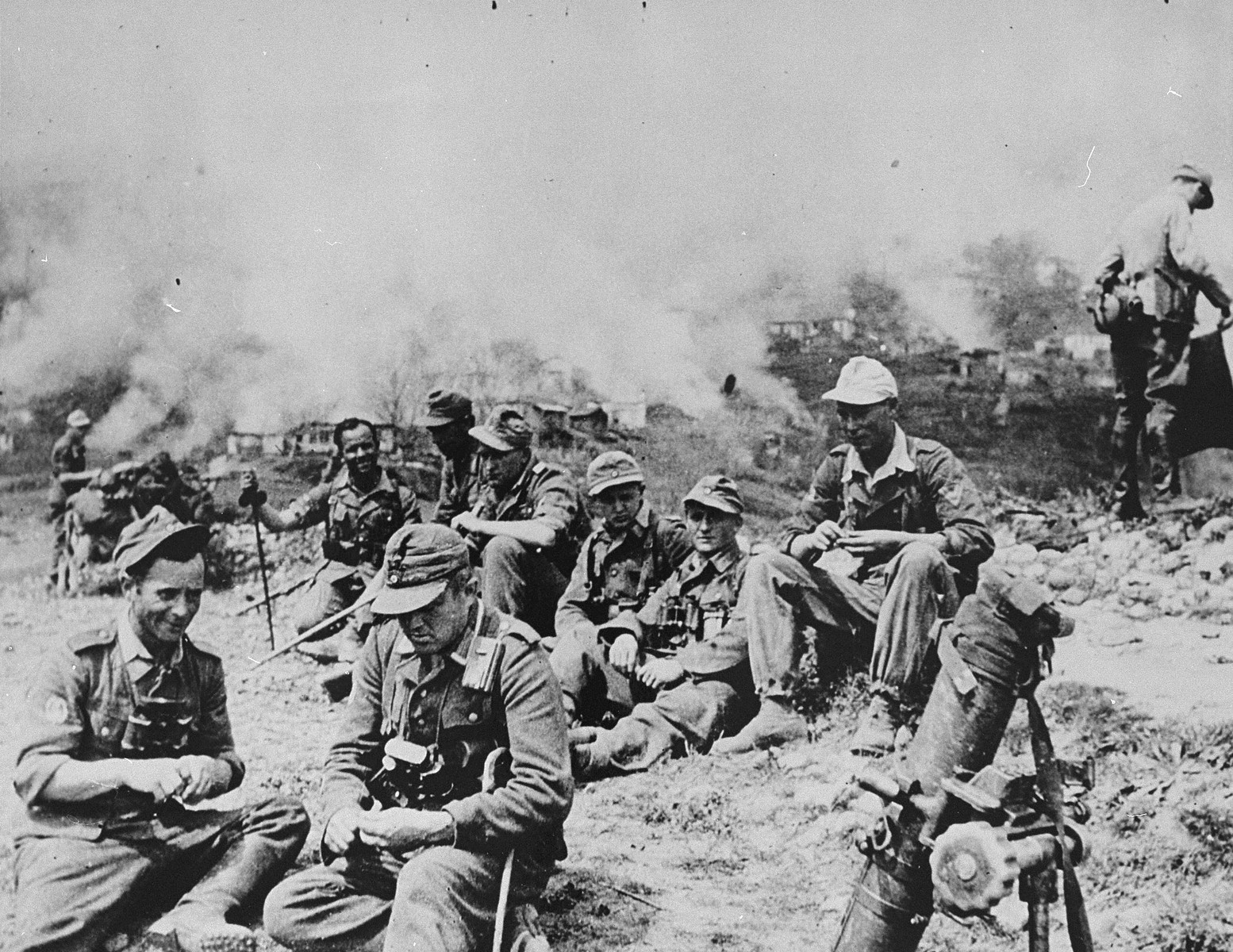
German mountain troops after destroying a village in Epirus

The Germans now took over the Italian zone, and soon proved to be a totally different opponent from the demoralized, war-weary and far less brutal Italians. Already since the early summer of 1943, German troops had been pouring into Greece, fearing an Allied landing there (in fact falling victims to a grand-scale Allied strategic deception operation, "Operation Barclay"). Soon they became involved in wide-ranging counterguerrilla operations, which they carried out with great ruthlessness, based on their experiences in Yugoslavia. In the course of these operations, mass reprisals were carried out, resulting in war crimes such as the massacres of Mousiotitsa on July 25, Kommeno on August 16, Lingiades on October 3, Kalavryta on December 13 and the Massacre of Distomo in June 1944. At the same time, hundreds of villages were systematically torched and almost one million people left homeless.

=== Prelude to Civil War: the first conflicts ===
Despite the signing of an agreement in July 1943 between the three main Resistance groups (EAM/ELAS, EDES and EKKA) to cooperate and to subject themselves to the Allied Middle East High Command under General Wilson (the "National Bands Agreement"), in the political field, the mutual mistrust between EAM and the other groups escalated. EAM-ELAS was by now the dominant political and military force in Greece, and EDES and EKKA, along with the British and the Greek government-in-exile, feared that after the inevitable German withdrawal, it would try to dominate the country and establish a soviet regime. This prospect was not only linked with the increasing distrust shown by many conservative and traditional liberal members of the Greek society towards the Communists and EAM, but also with British. The British were opposed to an EAM's after-war dominance in Greece due to their political opposition to communism, while on the logic of the spheres of influence they believed that such a development would lead the country, which traditionally considered belongs in their sphere of influence, to that of the Soviet Union. Finally the conflict of interests between them and the USSR settled after British secured Soviet assent to this in the so-called "percentages agreement" between Winston Churchill and Joseph Stalin in October 1944. EAM on its part considered itself "the only true resistance group". Its leadership viewed the British government's support for EDES and EKKA with suspicion, and viewed Zervas' contacts with London and the Greek government with distrust.

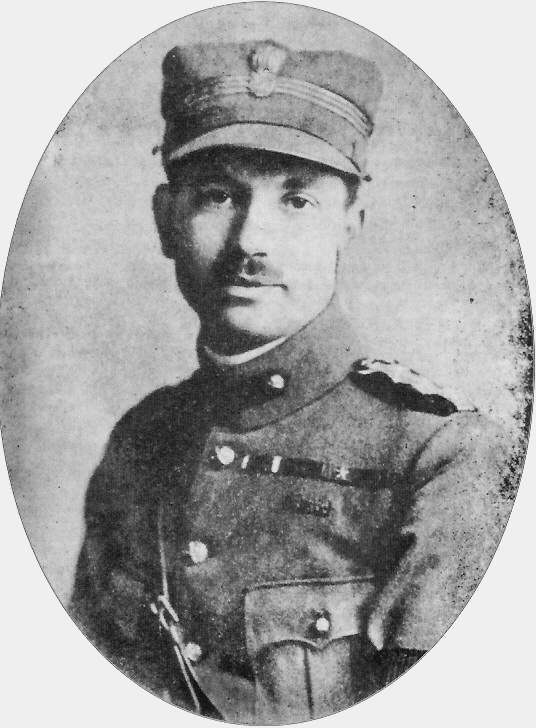
Dimitrios Psarros, leader of EKKA

At the same time, EAM found itself under attack by the Germans and their collaborators. Dominated by the old political class, and looking already to the oncoming post-Liberation era, the new Ioannis Rallis government had established the notorious Security Battalions, with the blessing of the German authorities, in order to fight exclusively against ELAS. Other anti-communist resistance groups, such as the royalist Organization "X", were also reinforced, receiving arms and funding by the British.

A virtual civil war was now being waged under the eyes of the Germans. In October 1943, ELAS attacked EDES in Epirus, where the latter organization was the dominant resistance group, by transferring units from the neighbouring regions. This conflict continued until February 1944, when the British mission in Greece succeeded in negotiating a ceasefire (the Plaka agreement) which in the event proved to be only temporary. The attack led to an unofficial truce between EDES and the German forces in Epirus under General Hubert Lanz. But the fight continued amongst ELAS and the other minor resistance groups (like "X"), as well as against the Security Battalions, even in the streets of Athens, until the German withdrawal in October 1944. In March, EAM established its own rival government in Free Greece, the Political Committee of National Liberation, clearly staking its claim to a dominant role in post-war Greece. Consequently, on Easter Monday, 17 April 1944, ELAS forces attacked and destroyed the EKKA's 5/42 Regiment, capturing and executing many of its men, including its leader Colonel Dimitrios Psarros. The event caused a major shock in the Greek political scene, since Psarros was a well-known republican, patriot and anti-royalist. For EAM-ELAS, this act was fatal, as it strengthened suspicion of its intentions for the post-Occupation period, and drove many liberals and moderates, especially in the cities, against it, cementing the emerging rift in Greek society between pro- and anti-EAM segments.

== Resistance in the islands and Crete ==
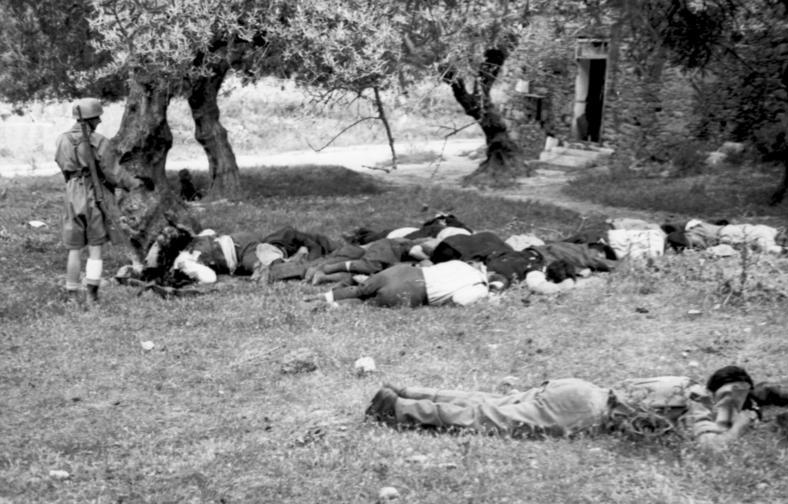
Greek civilians in Kondomari, Crete murdered by German paratroopers 1941

The resistance in Crete was centred in the mountainous interior, and despite the strong presence of German troops, developed significant activity. Notable figures of the Cretan Resistance include Patrick Leigh Fermor, Xan Fielding, Dudley Perkins, Thomas Dunbabin, Petrakogiorgis, Kimonas Zografakis, Manolis Paterakis and George Psychoundakis. Resistance operations included airfield sabotages, the abduction of General Heinrich Kreipe by Patrick Leigh Fermor and Bill Stanley Moss, the battle of Trahili, and the sabotage of Damasta. In reprisal, many villages were razed and their inhabitants murdered during anti-partisan operations. Examples include Missiria, Alikianos, Kali Sykia, Kallikratis, Kondomari, Skourvoula, Malathyros; the razings of Kandanos, Anogeia and Vorizia; the holocausts of Viannos and Kedros and numerous incidents of smaller scale.

On Euboea, Sara Fortis led a small, all-female company of partisans against the German occupational forces.

== Resistance in Macedonia and Thrace ==
On 4 September 1944 in Prosotsani, while Eastern Macedonia was still under Bulgarian occupation, Konstantinos Kazanas and Asterios Asteriadis lowered the Bulgarian flag in broad daylight and raised the Greek flag in the central square of the town, despite the terror and threats of the occupiers. This act, unique in occupied Europe, led to Kazanas' exile in prisons in Sofia, but was a blow to the fascist Bulgarian occupation forces and boosted the morale of Greek fighters and local population.

== Resistance in the cities ==
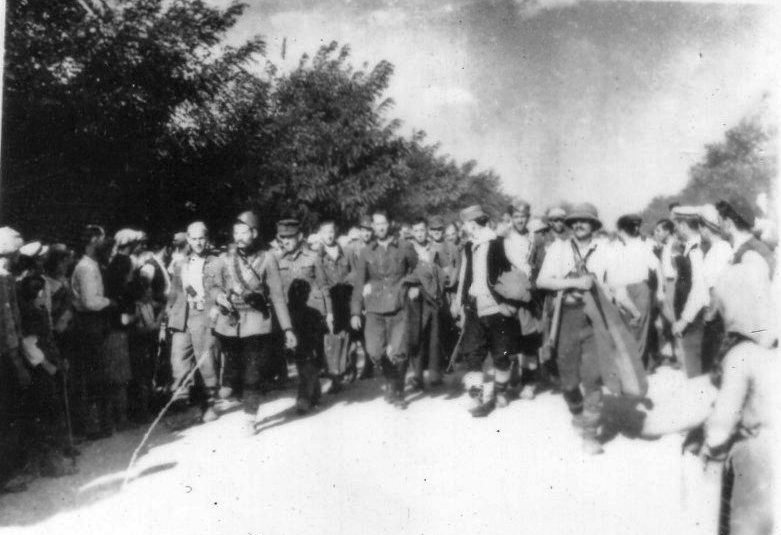
Captured Germans in the offensives of ELAS in Thrace

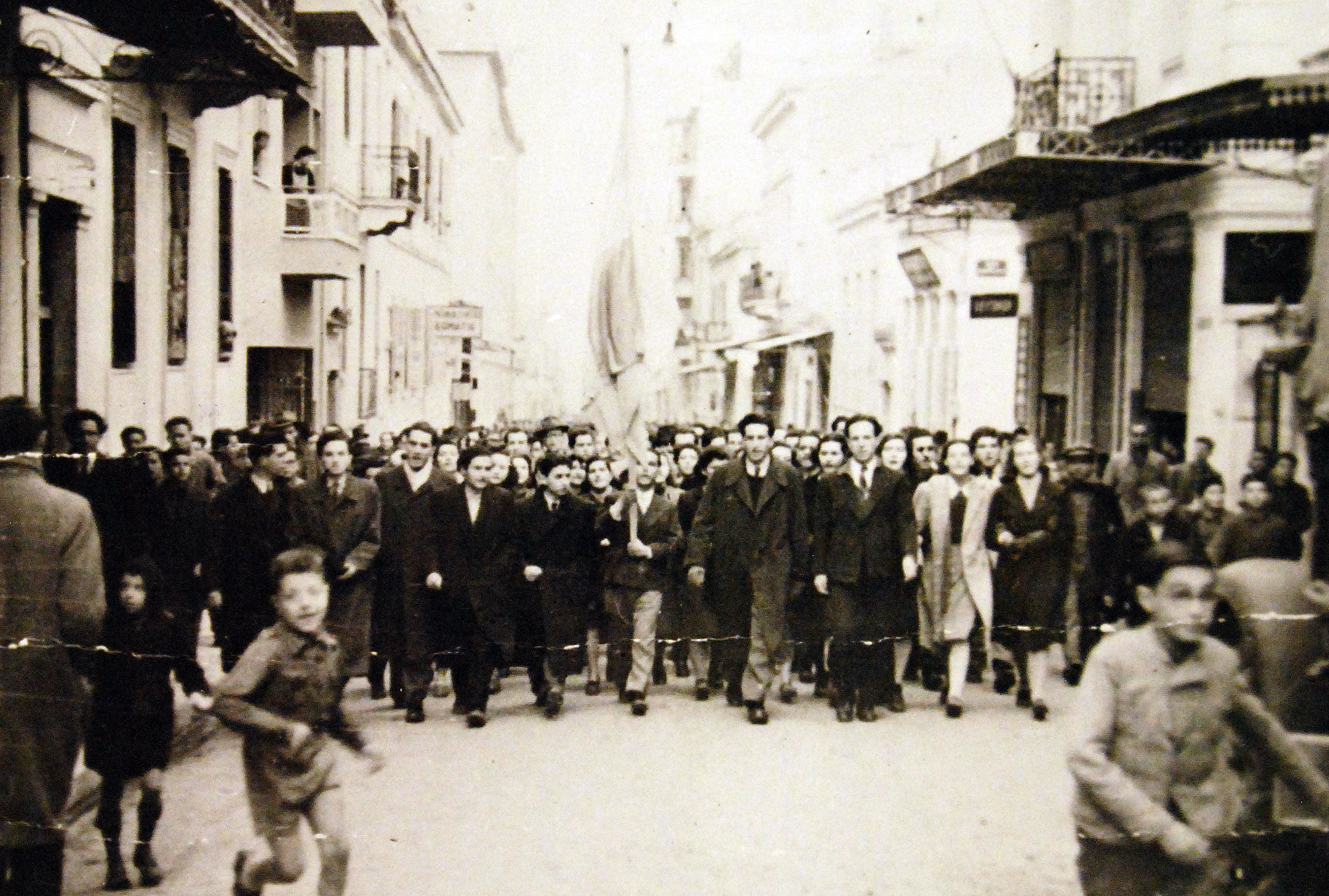
University students, parading in Athens on Greek Independence Day (25 March 1942)

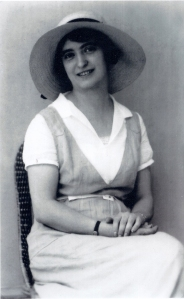
Lela Karagianni was head of the intelligence group Bouboulina. She was executed in September 1944 by the Germans

Resistance in the cities was organized quickly, but of necessity groups were small and fragmented. The cities, and the working-class suburbs of Athens in particular, witnessed appalling suffering in the winter of 1941–42, when food confiscations and disrupted communications caused widespread famine and perhaps hundreds of thousands of deaths. This caused fertile ground for recruitment, but lack of equipment, funds and organization limited the spread of the resistance. The main roles of resistance operatives were intelligence and sabotage, mostly in cooperation with British Intelligence. One of the earliest jobs of the urban resistance was helping stranded Commonwealth soldiers escape. The resistance groups stayed in touch with British handlers through wireless sets, met and helped British spies and saboteurs that parachuted in, provided intelligence, conducted propaganda efforts, and ran escape networks for allied operatives and Greek young men wishing to join the Hellenic forces in exile. Wireless equipment, money, weapons and other support was mainly supplied by British Intelligence, but it was never enough. Fragmentation of groups, the need for secrecy, and emerging conflicts between right and left, monarchists and republicans, did not help. Urban resistance work was very dangerous: operatives were always in danger of arrest and summary execution, and suffered heavy casualties. Captured fighters were routinely tortured by the Abwehr and the Gestapo, and confessions used to roll up networks. The job of wireless operators was perhaps the most dangerous, since the Germans used direction-finding equipment to pinpoint the location of transmitters; operators were often shot on the spot, and those were the lucky ones, since immediate execution prevented torture.

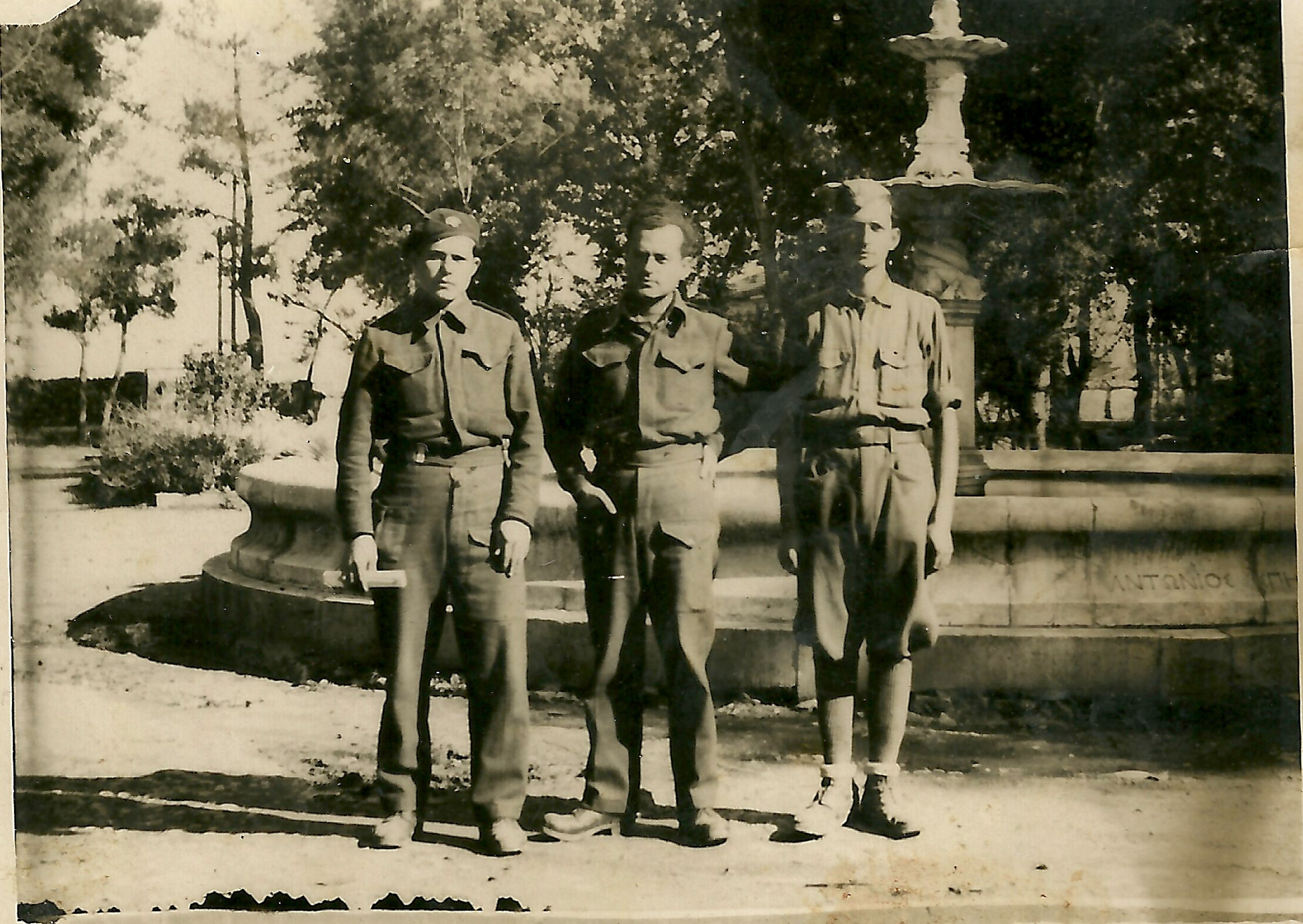
Panagiotis G. Tesseris (center) was a leader within EAM/ELAS. He is in full military uniform with other members of the Greek Resistance.

=== Urban protest ===
One of the most important forms of resistance were the mass protest movements. The first such event occurred during the national anniversary of 25 March 1942, when students attempted to lay a wreath at the Monument of the Unknown Soldier. This resulted in clashes with mounted Carabinieri, and marked the awakening of the spirit of Resistance amongst the wider urban population. Soon after, from 12 to 14 April, the "TTT" (Telecommunications & Postal) workers began a strike in Athens, which spread throughout the country. Initially, the strikers' demands were financial, but it quickly assumed a political aspect, as the strike was encouraged by EAM's labour union organization, EEAM. Finally, the strike ended on April 21, with the full capitulation of the collaborationist government to the strikers' demands, including the immediate release of arrested strike leaders.

In early 1943, rumours spread of a planned mobilization of the labour force by the occupation authorities, with the intent of sending them to work in Germany. The first reactions began amongst students on 7 February, but soon 1943 Greek protests against labour mobilization grew in scope and volume. Throughout February, successive strikes and demonstrations paralyzed Athens, culminating in a massive rally on the 24th. The tense climate was amply displayed at the funeral of Greece's national poet, Kostis Palamas, on 28 February, which turned into an anti-Axis demonstration.

=== Urban fighting ===
During the last months of the Axis occupation, battles against the occupying forces and their collaborators took place not only in the mountains but also in cities. For example, the Battle of Kokkinia in March 1944 in the Nikaia (aka Kokkinia) suburb of Athens between the ELAS forces assisted by the people of the neighborhood and the Axis forces assisted by the collaborationist Security Battalions ended with the retreat of the Nazi army from the area. Another urban battle during the last year of the occupation was that of Kaisariani in April 1944, when ELAS defended their positions in the Kaisariani suburb of Athens against the Nazi collaborators.

=== Risks involved ===
Resisting the Axis occupation was fraught with risks. Foremost among these for the partisans was death in combat as the German military forces were far superior. However, the guerrilla fighters also had to face starvation, brutal environmental conditions in the mountains of Greece, while poorly clothed and shod. The resistance also involved risks for ordinary Greeks. Attacks often incited reprisal killings of civilians by the German occupying forces. Villages were burned and their inhabitants massacred. The Germans also resorted to hostage-taking. There were also accusations that many of ELAS' attacks against German soldiers didn't happen for resistance reasons but aiming the destruction of specific villages and the recruitment of their men. Quotas were even introduced determining the number of civilians or hostages to be killed in response to the death or wounding of German soldiers.

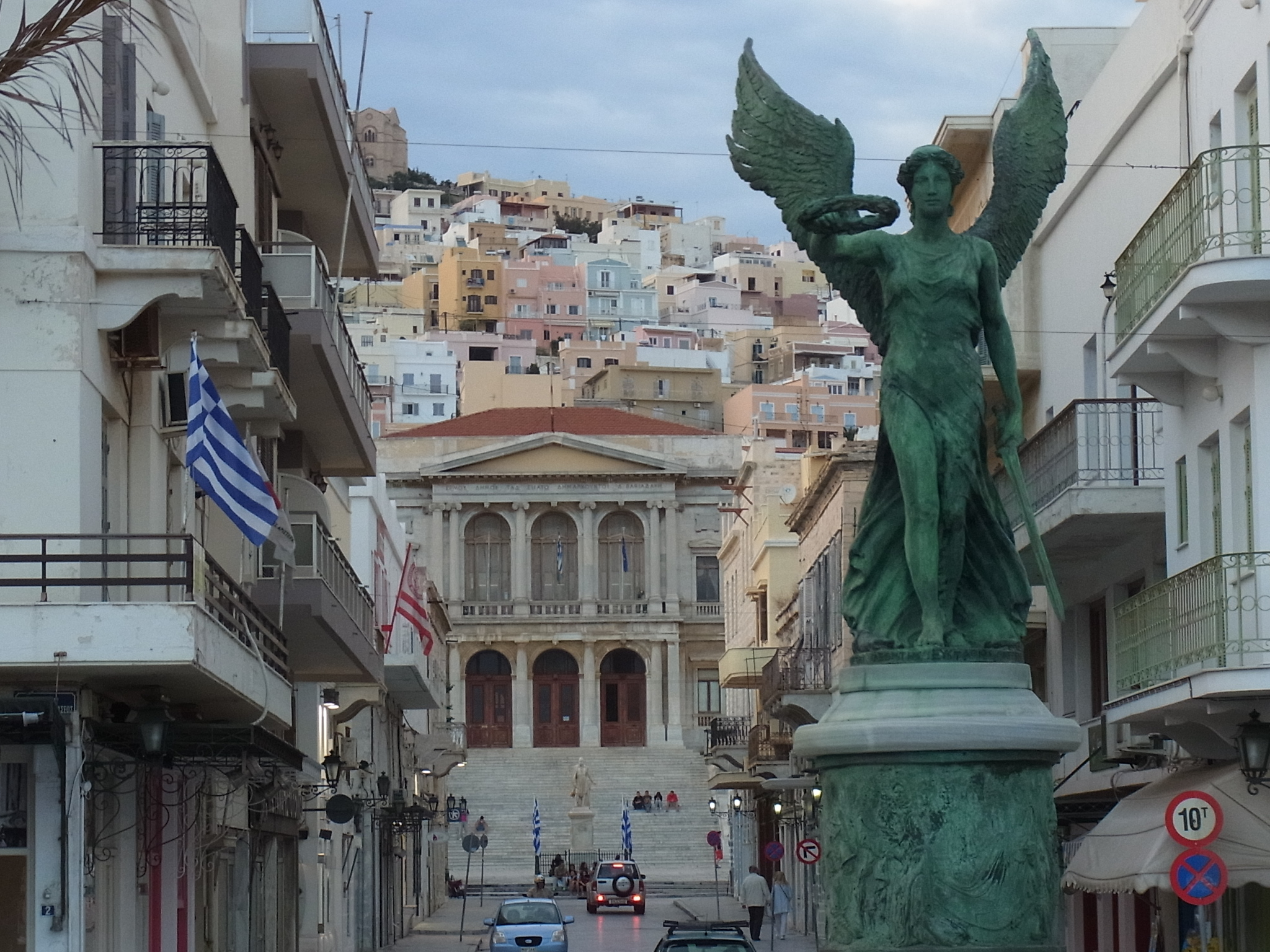
Statue of Nike (Victory) in Ermoupoli commemorating the Resistance

== Aftermath ==
During the Dekemvriana fighting in Athens, Franklin D. Roosevelt issued a statement disapproving of fighting between the British and EAM, and in private was reportedly appalled by what was happening in Greece. According to his son Elliott, Roosevelt privately stated "How the British can dare such a thing!... Killing Greek guerrillas! Using British soldiers for such a job! Likewise, American media coverage of the Dekemvriana was overwhelmingly hostile towards the British with American journalists criticizing Churchill for recruiting the Security Battalions to fight for the unpopular King George against the EAM. In response to American claims that Britain was exercising "power politics" in Greece, Churchill snapped back in a speech: "What are power politics?...Is having a Navy twice as big as any other Navy in the world power politics? Is having the largest Air Force in the world, with bases in every part of the world power politics? Is having all the gold in the world power politics? If so, we are certainly not guilty of these offences, I am sorry to say. They are luxuries that have passed away from us."

== Legacy ==
The Greek Resistance was one of the strongest resistance movements in Nazi-occupied Europe.

== Table of main resistance groups ==
Group name	Political orientation	Political leadership	Military arm	Military leadership	Estimated peak membership
National Liberation Front (Ethnikó Apeleftherotikó Métopo/ΕΑΜ)	Broad leftist front affiliated with the Communist Party of Greece	Georgios Siantos	Greek People's Liberation Army (Ellinikós Laikós Apeleftherotikós Stratós/ELAS)	Aris Velouchiotis, Stefanos Sarafis	50,000 + 30,000 reserves (October 1944)
National Republican Greek League (Ethnikós Dimokratikós Ellinikós Sýndesmos/EDES)	Venizelist, nationalist, republican, centrist, anti-communist	Nikolaos Plastiras (nominal), Komninos Pyromaglou	National Groups of Greek Guerrillas (Ethnikés Omádes Ellínon Antartón/EOEA)	Napoleon Zervas	12,000 + ca. 5,000 reserves (October 1944)
National and Social Liberation (Ethnikí Kai Koinonikí Apelefthérosis/EKKA)	Venizelist, republican, liberal, Social-Democratic	Georgios Kartalis	5/42 Evzone Regiment (5/42 Sýntagma Evzónon)	Dimitrios Psarros and Evripidis Bakirtzis	1,000 (spring 1943)

== Notable resistance members ==
EAM-ELAS-EPON:

- Elli Alexiou
- Electra Apostolou (executed)
- Sotiria Bellou
- Nikos Beloyannis
- Charilaos Florakis
- Manolis Glezos
- Dimitris Glinos
- Neokosmos Grigoriadis
- Solon Grigoriadis
- Father Germanos Dimakos
- Father Dimitrios Holevas
- Manolis Mantakas
- Yiannis Ritsos
- Alexandros Rosios
- Ptolemaios Sarigiannis
- Giorgios Siantos
- Stefanos Sarafis
- Apostolos Santas
- Alexandros Svolos
- Ilias Tsirimokos
- Andreas Tzimas
- Mikis Theodorakis
- Aris Velouchiotis
- Markos Vafeiadis
- Evripidis Bakirtzis
- Konstantinos Laggouranis
- Antonis Vratsanos
- Iannis Xenakis
- The 200 of Kaisariani
- Iro Konstantopoulou (executed)

EDES:

- Napoleon Zervas
- Archbishop Seraphim of Athens
- Komninos Pyromaglou
- Vasilios Sachinis (MAVI) (executed)

EKKA:

- Dimitrios Psarros (executed)
- Georgios Kartalis
- Evripidis Bakirtzis (later joined ELAS)
- Konstantinos Laggouranis (later joined ELAS)

PEAN:

- Kitsos Maltezos (executed)
- Anastasios Peponis
- Kostas Perrikos (executed)

Other:

- Sophia Antoniadis
- Evangelos Averoff
- Archbishop Chrysanthus of Athens
- Elias Degiannis (executed)
- Amalia Fleming
- Georgios Grivas
- Jerzy Iwanow-Szajnowicz (executed)
- Lela Karagianni (executed)
- Thomas Manolakos
- Themis Marinos
- Alexander Papagos
- Michalis Papazoglou
- Georgios Petrakis
- Ioannis Tsigantes
- Terpsichori Chryssoulaki-Vlachou (executed)
- Konstantinos Ventiris

British agents:

- E. C. W. "Eddie" Myers
- Christopher Woodhouse
- Patrick Leigh Fermor
- N. G. L. Hammond
- W. Stanley Moss
- Peter Fraser

== See also ==
- Military history of Greece during World War II
- June 1942 Crete airfield raids
- French Resistance
- Soviet partisans
- Polish resistance movement in World War II
- Partisans (Yugoslavia)

== Sources ==
- Baltsiotis, Lambros (13 November 2011). "The Muslim Chams of Northwestern Greece: The grounds for the expulsion of a "non-existent" minority community". European Journal of Turkish Studies. Social Sciences on Contemporary Turkey. 12: 1–31. doi:10.4000/ejts.4444. S2CID 142733144. Note 95
- R. Capell, Simiomata: A Greek Note Book 1944–45, London 1946
- Eudes, Dominique (1973). The Kapetanios: Partisans and Civil War in Greece, 1943–1949. Translated by John Howe. New York and London: Monthly Review Press. ISBN 978-0-85345-275-1.
- Clogg, Richard (1986), A Short History of Modern Greece, Cambridge University Press, ISBN 978-0-521-33804-2
- N.G.L. Hammond, Venture into Greece: With the Guerrillas, 1943–44, London, 1983. (Like Woodhouse, he was a member of the British Military Mission)
- Hammond, N. G. L. (1991). "The Allied Military Mission in Northwest Macedonia, 1943–44". Balkan Studies: Biannual Publication of the Institute for Balkan Studies. 32 (1): 107–144. ISSN 2241-1674.
- Howarth, Patrick (1980), Undercover: The Men and Women of the Special Operations Executive, Routledge, ISBN 978-0-7100-0573-1
- Drez, Ronald J. (2009), Heroes Fight Like Greeks: The Greek Resistance Against the Axis Powers in WWII, Ghost Road Press, ISBN 978-0-9816525-9-7
- Knopp, Guido (2009). Die Wehrmacht – Eine Bilanz (in German). Goldmann. ISBN 978-3-442-15561-3.
- Mark Mazower (2001). Inside Hitler's Greece: The Experience of Occupation, 1941–44. United States: Yale University Press. ISBN 978-0-300-08923-3.
- Papastratis, Prokopis (1984), British Policy towards Greece during the Second World War, 1941–1944, Cambridge University Press, ISBN 978-0-521-24342-1
- Perdue, Robert E. Jr. (2010). Behind the Lines in Greece: The Story of OSS Operational Group II. Bloomington, IN: AuthorHouse. ISBN 978-1-4490-6789-2. LCCN 2010900278.
- Shrader, Charles R. (1999). The Withered Vine: Logistics and the Communist Insurgency in Greece, 1945–1949. Greenwood Publishing Group. ISBN 978-0-275-96544-0.
- Woodhouse, Christopher Montague (2002), The Struggle for Greece, 1941–1949, C. Hurst & Co. Publishers, ISBN 978-1-85065-487-2
- Reginald Leeper, When Greek Meets Greek: On the War in Greece, 1943–1945
- United States Army Center of Military History, German Antiguerrilla Operations in The Balkans (1941–1944) Washington, D.C.: United States Army.
- Hondros, John L. (1983), Occupation and Resistance: The Greek Agony, New York: Pella Publishing
- Stavrianos, L. S. (1952). "The Greek National Liberation Front (EAM): A Study in Resistance Organization and Administration". The Journal of Modern History. 24 (1): 42–55. doi:10.1086/237474. JSTOR 1871980. S2CID 143755996.
- Shafer, Michael (1988). Deadly Paradigms: The Failure of U.S. Counterinsurgency Policy. Princeton: Princeton University Press. ISBN 9781400860586.
- Gluckstein, Donny (2012). A People's History of the Second World War: Resistance Versus Empire. Pluto Press. ISBN 978-1-84964-719-9.
- Weinberg, Gerhard (2005). A World In Arms A Global History of World War II. Cambridge: Cambridge University Press. ISBN 9-780521-618267.
- Resis, Albert (April 1978). "The Churchill-Stalin Secret 'Percentages' Agreement on the Balkans, Moscow, October 1944". American Historical Review. 83 (2): 368–387. doi:10.2307/1862322. JSTOR 1862322.
