= Greece: The Hidden War =

1986 television documentary on Greek Civil War

Greece: The Hidden War is a 1986 television documentary series about the background to the Greek Civil War. The series, which explores the contribution of British policy and actions to the civil war, was highly controversial and was banned from being reshown in its existing form by the IBA.

The documentary was produced by and scripted by Jane Gabriel and directed by Anthony Howard. It was originally shown in three parts on 6, 13 and 30 January 1986 on Britain's Channel 4. People interviewed include:

- Major Greek players, such as Markos Vafeiadis (resistance and civil war leader), 'Father Germanos' Dimakis (priest and EAM-ELAS fighter), Giorgos Chouliaris (Pericles), Alekos Rosios (Ypsilantis), Spyros Kotsakis, Spyros Meletzis (ELAS photographer).
- Other Greek participants in the resistance, talking of their role in the resistance, their experience of the campaign of terror by the far-right which followed the dissolution of the resistance army, and of the subsequent civil war.
- British players and commentators, such as Chris "Monty" Woodhouse, Eddie Myers, Richard Acland, Sir Geoffrey Chandler, Edward Warner, Nigel Clive, David Balfour, and British soldiers of various ranks.
