= Andreas Tzimas =

Greek politician

- Born: 1 September 1909; Kastoria, Ottoman Empire (modern Greece)
- Died: 1 December 1972 (aged 63); Prague, Czechoslovakia
- Other name: Vasilis Samariniotis (nom de guerre)
- Political party: Communist Party of Greece

Andreas Tzimas (Greek: Ανδρέας Τζήμας; 1 September 1909 – 1 December 1972), known also under his World War II-era nom de guerre of Vasilis Samariniotis (Βασίλης Σαμαρινιώτης), was a leading Greek Communist politician, best known as one of the leading triumvirate of the Greek People's Liberation Army during the Axis occupation of Greece. After the war, he fell into disfavour and died in obscurity in exile in Prague.

== Life ==
Andreas Tzimas was an Aromanian. The eldest of four children, Tzimas was born to the family of Dimitrios Tzimas, an Aromanian jurist and lawyer from Samarina. Andreas' mother originated from an Aromanian family from Moscopole, in what is now Albania. Born in Kastoria, Tzimas spent his first years in Skopje, where his father had moved, until the Balkan Wars led the family to relocate once more to Kastoria, which now had passed from the Ottoman Empire to the Kingdom of Greece. Despite his father's conservative and royalist tendencies—he even served briefly as an MP with Ioannis Metaxas' Freethinkers' Party in 1926–28—the young Andreas swiftly turned to the nascent Communist Party of Greece (KKE), leading to his expulsion from his law studies in the University of Athens in 1929. He returned to his home town of Kastoria, and performed his military service in 1930. Although as the eldest in a family of four sons he was slated for only four months service, eventually he remained in the army for ten, having "earned" six months from disciplinary punishments due to his political alignment.

In 1931 he was arrested under the idionymon law, and spent one and a half years at the feared Heptapyrgion prison and a year in internal exile on Gavdos (until February 1934). There he met among others Thanasis Klaras, the future Aris Velouchiotis.

In 1934 he was sent to Moscow for higher studies. Following his return he was active in the party organization in Athens, until elected as an MP in the January 1936 election. His father had died a few days earlier. Following the establishment of the dictatorial and fanatically anti-communist 4th of August Regime under Ioannis Metaxas in 1936, the entire Communist Party went underground. Tzimas remained active in the region of Western Thrace, managing to remain at large until his arrest in April 1939. He was imprisoned in the Akronauplia prison, where he remained until after the German invasion of Greece.

He was released by the new German authorities on 1 July 1941 due to the intervention of the Bulgarian government, which sought the release of any prisoners of Bulgarian descent. Although not a Bulgarian himself, Tzimas spoke the language, and managed to be released as well (along with a few others like him). With so many leading members imprisoned, Tzimas rapidly advanced in the hierarchy of the newly reconstituted party: almost immediately he became a Central Committee member, and in January 1942 he became an alternate member of the KKE's Politburo. From August 1941 until March 1942 he was first secretary of the prestigious Athens Party Organization (KOA), and played a major role in the establishment of the National Liberation Front (EAM) in September 1941 and in KKE's decision to launch an armed guerrilla campaign, leading to the establishment of the Greek People's Liberation Army (ELAS).

While the KKE leadership clung to orthodox communist doctrine emphasizing the importance of the capital, Tzimas was the leading proponent of having members of KKE leadership move to the countryside, actively promote both the guerrilla campaign and the initiatives to establish "people's power" (laokratia) there. On 2 May 1943, his proposals for the creation of an ELAS high command were adopted by KKE and EAM. From then on, along with the "chief captain" Aris Velouchiotis and the senior military commander, Stefanos Sarafis, Tzimas formed the leading triumvirate of ELAS, with the nom de guerre of "Vasilis Samariniotis" (after his father's home town). He favoured close co-operation with Tito's Yugoslav Partisans, even supporting the establishment of a common Balkan partisan headquarters, without success. In October 1943 he was sent as part of the first EAM delegation to Cairo for talks with the British and the royal Greek government in exile, and after December 1943 served as ELAS' liaison with Tito. In the April 1944 elections held across "Free Greece", he was elected as a representative of the "National Council", the legislative assembly established by EAM.

Despite his distinguished role in the Greek Resistance, after liberation he fell into disfavour with the party establishment: his failure to be elected to the Central Committee in 1945 was followed by his arrest and exile to Ikaria. Although he escaped in 1947 and joined the fight of the KKE-backed Democratic Army of Greece in the ongoing Greek Civil War, he remained on the sidelines. After the KKE's defeat in the civil war, he and his family went to Hungary, and then to Czechoslovakia, where he died in obscurity in 1972.

Tzimas spoke Greek, Aromanian, Bulgarian and Serbo-Croatian.

== Sources ==
- Eudes, Dominique (1973). The Kapetanios: Partisans and Civil War in Greece, 1943-1949. Translated by John Howe. New York and London: Monthly Review Press. ISBN 978-0-85345-275-1.
- Koliopoulos, John S. (1999). Plundered Loyalties: World War II and Civil War in Greek West Macedonia. Foreword by C. M. Woodhouse. London: Hurst & Company. ISBN 1-85065-381-X.
