= Red Terror (Greece) =

Incidence of violence against civilians during Greek Civil War

- Part of World War II and Greek Civil War
- Location: Kingdom of Greece, Hellenic State, Kingdom of Bulgaria
- Date: 1943–1949
- Target: 1943 - 1944: Italian, Nazi, Bulgarian, Greek Collaborators, EDES, EKKA, and other Greek Anti-Communists, and ethnic minorities 1944 - 1949: Greek Government, Hellenic army, British Government Officials, Clergymen, Political Dissidents within KKE, and ethnic minorities
- Attack type: Politicide, Kidnapping, forced labour, Political repression, Political violence, Political Purge
- Deaths: several thousands killed (numbers varies)
- Victim: 28,000 children abducted 50,000 civilians displaced
- Perpetrators: EAM-ELAS, Communist Party of Greece, and Provisional Democratic Government
- Motive: Enforcing Communist Ideals, Anti-Fascism, Anti-Monarchism, Party Purge within KKE

Red Terror (Greek: Ερυθρά or Κόκκινη Τρομοκρατία) is a term used by some historians to describe incidents of violence against civilians that were considered "traitors" by EAM (which was directed mainly by the KKE), because these civilians allegedly collaborated with groups (occupying forces, militia groups such as EDES, royalists etc) that wanted Greece to be under the political, economic and military influence of other foreign forces; either of Axis powers, from 1943 to 1944 or under British influence, from 1943 to 1949 and during the Greek Civil War. In the countryside, operations were conducted by the ELAS; in cities, by the Organization for the Protection of the People's Struggle (OPLA).

The discourse about "red terrorism" was first formulated during the German Occupation as part of the anti-EAM propaganda of the occupying forces and their Greek collaborators. Later it was adopted by a British commission which mediated between EAM-ELAS and the Greek authorities soon after the end of German occupation. After the Greek Civil War it became a key interpretive scheme in the right-wing historiography.

== World War II ==
During the Axis occupation of Greece, acts of violence by EAM and ELAS against leaders and members of other resistance organizations occurred in Northern Greece, Achaea, Messenia, Elis and elsewhere. Acts that could be described as "terrorist", started in Macedonia in April 1943. The leaders of the minor resistance group PΑO (accused of collaboration with the Germans) were executed. Officers of the Greek Army were arrested and executed in Phocis (Central Greece), accused for “non-resistance to Italians” and being “counter-revolutionaries”, but were not accused for collaboration with the enemy. Other executions with political motivations took place in Kastoria. ΕΑΜ preferred the method of abduction and execution of victims far from their place, by persons who didn't know the victims. In February 1944, when Nazi German occupying forces with Greek collaborators intruded an EAM base, a mass grave was discovered near a Macedonian village. Three persons cooperating with a British intelligence network surveying German and Bulgarian occupation forces in Chalkidiki were executed, probably accused of acting against EAM.

According to Mark Mazower (based on a testimony of a British soldier), on the mountains of the Delphi area, ELAS arrested and executed citizens on the grounds that they were collaborating with the British mission, arguing that "this action [collaboration] means that they are Gestapo agents". A British army officer noted in early September 1944 that terrorism prevailed in Attica and Boeotia, while another British officer wrote: "Over 500 persons have been executed in a few weeks. Due to the smell of the unburied, access is almost impossible. Naked bodies are laid unburied, shot on their heads". Turkish communities were also targeted in Macedonia with accusations of being potential collaborators with the Axis forces, leading to many Turkish civilians, along with other ethnic groups, such as Vlachs, Slavs, Albanians, and Jews, becoming displaced or killed by the communists.

== Greek Civil War ==
German forces evacuated Greece by the end of 1944. Acts of red terrorism intensified in Macedonia soon after. However, EAM avoided action against Slavophone resistance organizations, while it managed to include in its ranks many Slav former quislings. This policy was probably due to the fact that the EAM wanted to win allies in the upcoming battle against the Greek government of Georgios Papandreou. Many prisoners of the EAM in Macedonia were released after the Dekemvriana in Athens, but executions did not totally cease. ΕΑΜ operated concentration camps in Macedonia. Hundreds of civilians were forced to march from the cities of Kastoria and Florina to the camps, some of them accused of anglophilia.

In January 1945 ELAS forces in Lakka of Souli in Epirus mass executed unarmed former resistance fighters of EDES, members of their families (including children and women), other civilians, totally 85 persons from the neighbouring villages.

During the war, Communist forces enacted the policy of "borrowing" children with the purpous of indoctrination and re-education with the intention of molding children into "enemies of their country, religion, and parents" These children would be taken from families who were loyal to the government or children who were left unattended and would be taken during and after the war into re-education camps and foreign communist countries including Hungary, Czechoslovakia, Poland, and Soviet Uzbekistan. The curriculum focused on demonizing the current government as a fake Greece that the rebels, who are the real government, are fighting to abolish and historical revisionism with erasing ancient Greek philosophy and changing narratives about the Greek War of Independence. The goal of the program was for after a communist victory, the children would be repatriated into the country and be a viable force to rebuild the motherland. While estimates range between 25,000 and 50,000 children were disappeared, the common consensus is that 28,000 children were taken by the communists. By 1953, only 538 children were reunited with their families. Due to the hostile nature of the abductions and goals of the communists, according to Kourtis Dimitrios the Genocide Convention considers these actions perpetrated by the communists to be a form of genocide.

== Use of the term ==
The term “Red Terror(ism)” was already used in 1944 by Greek anticommunists and by the German-controlled counterinsurgency force during the Occupation, the Security Battalions.

The term was also adopted by the British Citrine Commission, which attempted to mediate between ELAS and the British Forces who intervened in Greece after the Dekemvriana. The commission was asking for the release of some thousands of hostages held by the ELAS, but did not mention the preventive arrest of 20,000 EAM members, and the fate of others held by the British authorities in Egypt. The pro-EAM fighters of the Greek Armed Forces in the Middle East had earlier participated in a mutiny within this corps. Reference to "Red Terror" was made by the newly appointed Prime Minister of the Greek government-in-exile, Georgios Papandreou, in the Lebanon Conference (May 1944). In April 1944 ELAS attacked the venizelist resistance organization ΕΚΚΑ (the military wing of which was the 5/42 Evzone Regiment) that was commanded by Colonel Dimitrios Psarros. The outnumbered 5/42 Regiment was defeated and Psarros was arrested and assassinated by ELAS, an event which rallied opposition to EAM. Νevertheless, according to most of historians, the assassination was not political but was for personal reasons. According to a different view, the assassination was ordered by a high-rank member of EAM-ELAS and carried out by an EAM-ELAS officer who was a trusted person of the KKE General Secretary Georgios Siantos.

== In modern historiography ==
=== Generally accepted view ===
Supporters of EAM and most historians consider EAM the main resistance movement (among with EDES) during the war and believe that these manifestations of violence are mainly due to the personalities and particular zeal of local EAM executives. Manolis Glezos, politician and former ΚΚΕ member, admitted that ELAS “did some killing” out of revenge but that this was officially forbidden by the organization's principles.

== Bibliography ==
- Kalogrias, Vaios (December 2015). "Collaborationism and "Red Terror" in Greek Macedonia, 1943-1944". Qualestoria. 2. hdl:10077/21224. ISSN 0393-6082.
- Kalyvas, Stathis N. (2001). "Red Terror: Leftist Violence during the Occupation" (PDF). In Mazower, Mark (ed.). After the War Was Over: Reconstructing the Family, Nation, and State in Greece, 1943-1960.
- Kallianiotis Athanasios, Οι πρόσφυγες στη Δυτική Μακεδονία (1941–1946), 2007
- Kostopoulos, Tassos (2005). Η αυτολογοκριμένη μνήμη: τα τάγματα ασφαλείας και η μεταπολεμική εθνικοφροσύνη. Athens: Philistor.
