= Organization X =

Greek militant organization during World War II and the Greek Civil War

- Οργάνωσις Χ
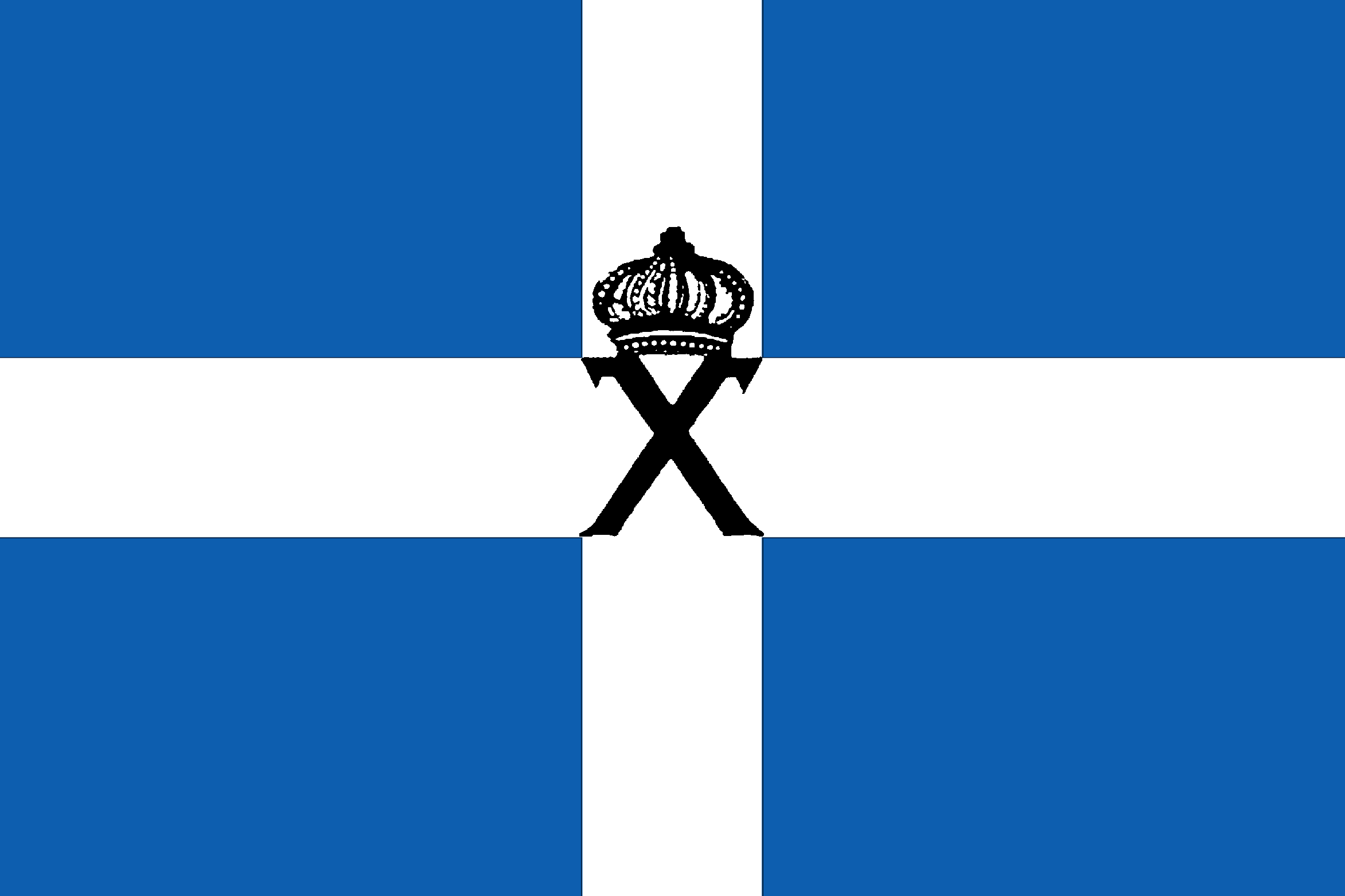
- Flag of the Organization X
- Leader: Georgios Grivas
- Dates active: 1941 – 22 January 1949
- Ideology: Greek nationalism Royalism; Anti-communism; Right-wing populism
- Political position: Right-wing
- Size: 200,000 (1946)
- Part of: Panhellenic Liberation Coalition (PAS)
- Wars: the Greek Resistance and the Greek Civil War

Organization X (Greek: Οργάνωσις Χ; commonly referred to simply as X ("Chi" in Greek) and members as Chites (Χίτες)) was a paramilitary right-wing anti-communist royalist organization set up in 1941 during the Axis occupation of Greece.

Initially an anti-Axis resistance organization, it gradually shifted its focus towards anti-communism. In 1951, X was officially recognized as a National Organization of Internal Resistance by the Greek Ministry of National Defense.

Following the end of the Axis occupation, it played an active role in the persecution of communists during the White Terror and various military operations of the Greek Civil War, most notably the Dekemvriana.

== Foundation and activities during the Occupation ==
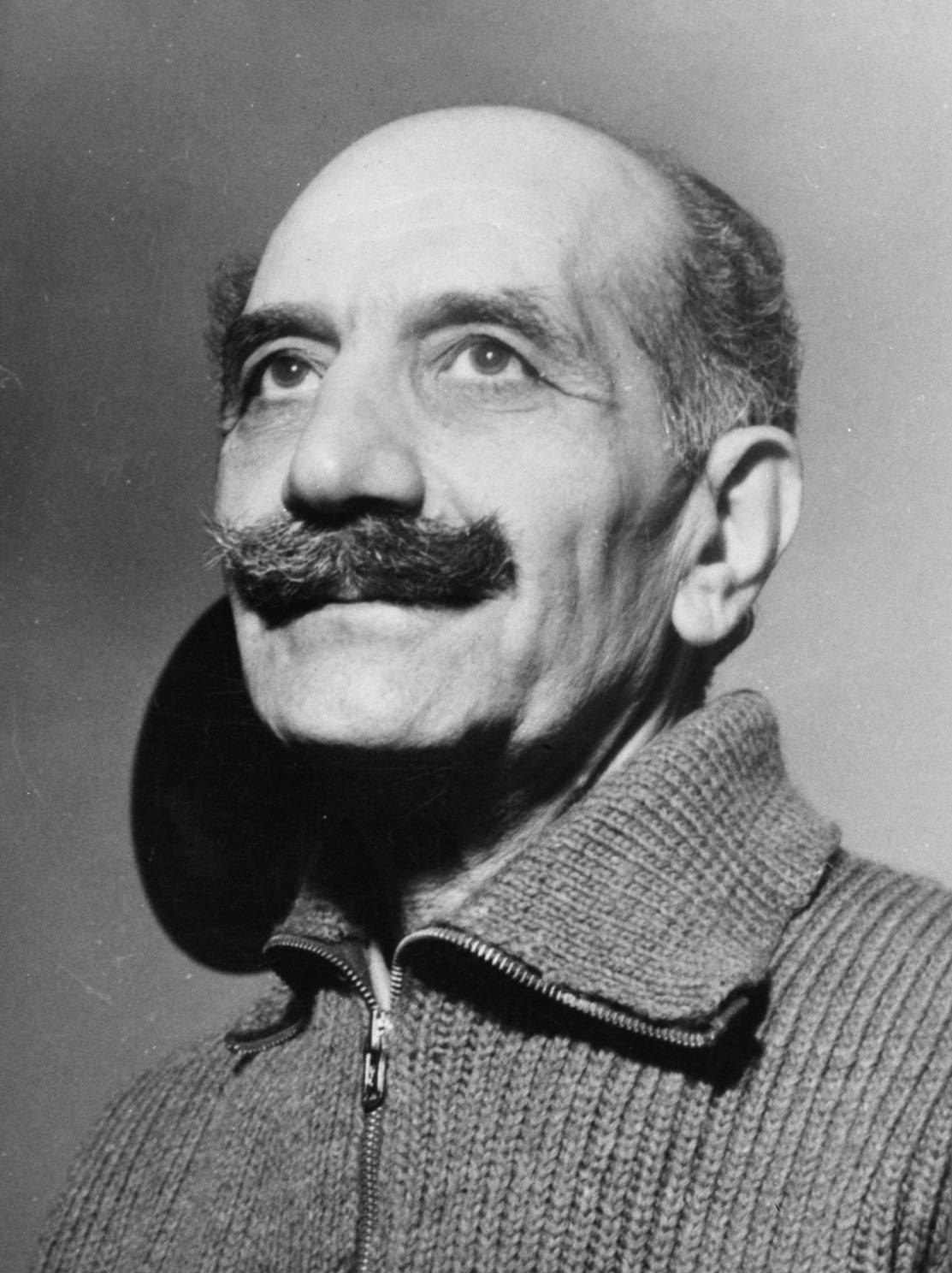
Georgios Grivas

Organization X was founded in 1941 by General Georgios Lavdas with Colonel Georgios Grivas acting as his chief of staff. Lavdas soon came into conflict with other members of the group because of his radical monarchist ideology, leading him to depart X with a small group of officers and create another resistance organization known by the acronym E.E. The remaining members of X recognized Grivas as their new commander. X's efforts revolved around gathering intelligence for the Allied cause, minor anti-German actions and transport of volunteers to the Middle East. However, with the EAM's meteoric rise to prominence within the Greek resistance movement, X shifted its attention towards combating EAM and other affiliated communist groups.

Following the Italian surrender to the Allies in September 1943, X began purchasing weapons from the Axis authorities, transforming into a militant anti-communist organization. In November 1943, Organization X, Rumelia-Avlona-Nisoi (RAN), National Committee, National Action and other minor right-wing resistance organizations formed the Panhellenic Liberation Coalition (PAS); with the intention of preventing a communist takeover of the country within the first 20 days following the end of Axis occupation.

In August 1944, members of collaborationist organizations such as the EEE and Security Battalions began enlisting into X and EDES en-masse in order to avoid persecution as liberation seemed imminent. Grivas concentrated his efforts in the wealthy districts of Athens and expanded X to between 2,000 and 3,000 men in 1944. He recruited his men and arms from officers who were retained on the active list by the quisling government. Before the German departure fortified a base near the ancient temple of Thiseion. Towards the end of the Occupation, X received British arms and uniforms from Middle East Command representative in Athens Panagiotis Spiliotopoulos. X then enacted armed patrols from the eastern coast of Attica to the Athens city center.

== The Dekemvriana ==
In the weeks between the departure of the Germans and the events of December 1944 (the Dekemvriana), X played an active part in the campaign of provocation of Athenians orchestrated by the British, according to ELAS' members. This commenced in Athens on 12 October, the day that Athens was celebrating liberation, when a mixed group of EDES and X militants killed Theodoros Tsilikas, a member of the ELAS. In late October, the X of Thiseio, reinforced by Security Battalionists, made an incursion into Petralona and killed 20 locals, including a number of Petralona gypsies.

On 3 December 1944, a 250,000-strong (but unarmed) demonstration in the Athens–Piraeus area was shot at by Greek police under command of the police chief Angelos Evert, with between 22 and 28 people killed and hundreds wounded. In the early morning hours of 4 December, ELAS forces launched their counteroffensive, attacking Grivas' X forces. In the evening, a peaceful demonstration by EAM members funeral procession was attacked by Chites under the leadership of Colonel Grivas, who killed over 100 EAM members. The attack took place with no intervention by the government. This followed the Dekemvriana, in which X supported the British and Greek government forces.

== X during the White Terror ==
In accordance with the Treaty of Varkiza of February 1945, ELAS disarmed, leaving its supporters vulnerable to attacks from right-wing forces, during a period known as the White Terror. The White Terror was conducted by an informal alliance of army officers, National Guards, gendarmes, policemen, armed gangs, militias, political organizations and people from families who had victims during the occupation and Dekemvriana seeking revenge. The majority were determined to prepare the way for a rigged plebiscite and the return of the king. Anyone deemed to be left-wing, or who had supported the communist-led resistance (EAM or ELAS) in any way was subjected to random beatings, repeated arrests, torture, murder or rape. Many people left their villages for safety either in the big towns or in the mountains. Civil war had now appeared to be inevitable.

X played an active role in the White Terror, and even in the weeks before Varkiza, British officials were complaining of police using elements of X and EDES to make political arrests under warrants issued by a police magistrate who was a member of X. British authorities estimated X's ranks to have swelled to over 200,000 men at the time. One of the significant events involving X occurred in January 1946 when 1000 Chites under the command of militant leader Manganas took over the town of Kalamata in the Peloponnese. They released 32 right-wing prisoners and terrorized the town during the night, killing 6 people. In 1948, Manganas extended his reign of terror over the Olympia region.

During 1945, attempts were made to coordinate persecution of the Left. Much of the liaison was conducted by X, which from May 1945 sent agents into the provinces to recruit members, and accepted affiliation from numerous other organizations. The local right-wing organizations rigged the electoral process and compiled lists of people to be arrested in the event of a coup.

As the general election approached early in 1946 the role of X diminished. Themistoklis Sophoulis’s government closed X’s national offices in January, and its successor did not allow them to reopen. Members of the organization formed the "Party of X" and took part in the elections of 1946, without electing any MP. By 1946, X was regarded as an embarrassment as it discredited the Greek government in international eyes.

In 1951, X was officially recognized as a National Organization of Internal Resistance by the Greek Ministry of National Defense (the biggest resistance organization EAM-ELAS was not recognized until 1982).
