= Sara Fortis =

Greek partisan (born 1927)

- שרה פורטיס
- Born: Sarika Yehoshua; 1927; Chalcis, Greece
- Occupation: Greek resistance member

Sara Fortis (Hebrew: שרה פורטיס; born 1927) is a Greek-Israeli former resistance member. During World War II, Fortis fought as part of the Greek resistance against the occupying Axis powers. She later resettled in Israel.

== Biography ==
Sara Fortis was born Sarika Yehoshua in 1927 in Chalkis. She was raised by her mother after her father died early in her life. The family identified themselves as Greek, but practiced aspects of their Jewish faith. Sara was the niece of Mordechai Frizis, a high ranking Jewish officer in the Greek army who would later be killed in Greco-Italian War.

When the German and Italian armies invaded and overran Greece in the spring of 1941, Sarika and her mother disguised their faith and blended into the civilian population; however, in 1943 they fled their home and took refuge in the mountain countryside of Euboea. There, Sara became involved in the local Greek resistance movement against the German occupation forces. She focused her efforts on recruiting other women to fight against the Germans; this paid off, and she was able to form a fighting force that specialized in using diversionary tactics to draw German soldiers away from areas that other resistance fighters planned to attack. Despite the success of these actions, Sara and her band were not always credited with their victories, as it was unfathomable that women could accomplish such acts.

By the age of 18, Sara was well-known enough to be referred to as "Captain Sarika". She continued to fight against the Germans until the liberation of Greece in late 1944. After the withdraw of the German army, Greece descended into a state of civil war as left and right wing factions inside the country battled for control. Sara's rebel group was in opposition to the right-wing Greek government, resulting in her eventual arrest. However, she was released and resettled in Israel.

In 1991 her home in Israel was destroyed by an Iraqi SCUD missile during the Persian Gulf War.
