= Terpsichori Chryssoulaki-Vlachou =

Greek resistance member

Terpsichori Chryssoulaki-Vlachou, (Greek: Τερψιχόρη Χρυσουλάκη-Βλάχου), born in Sitia, (Greek: Σητεία), was a Greek female radio operator working for the Greek resistance during World War II. She was executed by the Nazis when caught.

== Biography ==
Born in 1926 on the island of Crete, Greece, Terpsichori was one of the many Cretan women who responded eagerly and passionately to the national call by the Greek government to fight Nazi occupation of Greece during World War II. Hidden in the monastery of Toplou, (Greek: Τοπλού), her experience as a wireless operator helped the resistance movement.

In June 1944 she was arrested and sentenced to death. At age 18, she was taken to Agia Jail (Greek: Αγιά Χανίων) and executed, but before her execution, she wrote on the wall of her jail cell, "I am 18 years old and sentenced to death. I am waiting for the firing squad any minute now. Long live Greece. Long live Crete!". (Greek: "Είμαι 18 χρονών. Με καταδίκασαν σε θάνατο. Περιμένω από στιγμή σε στιγμή το εκτελεστικό απόσπασμα. Ζήτω η Ελλάδα. Ζήτω η Κρήτη!".)
