= Georgios Kartalis =

Greek politician

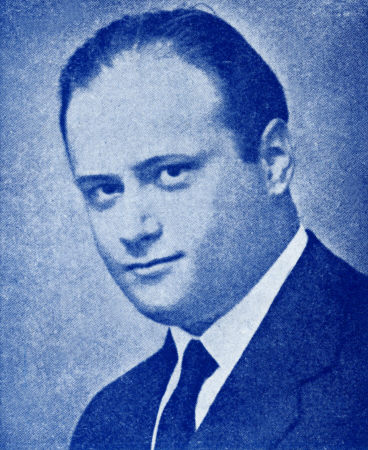
Georgios Kartalis

Georgios Kartalis (Greek: Γεώργιος Καρτάλης; 1908–1957) was a Greek politician.

== Early life and political career ==
Kartalis was born in Athens to a distinguished family from Volos. He went to school in Geneva and enrolled in the ETH Zürich, only to change after the first year to Economics at the Ludwig-Maximilians-Universität München and Leipzig University. He continued his studies by taking courses in Economy at the London School of Economics (1930–1932) and Kiel University (1932–1933).

Kartalis returned to Greece in 1933 in order to take up the family's role in the local politics of Volos. He stood unsuccessfully for the city's mayor in 1933, but in the June 1935 elections he was elected as an MP in the People's Party ticket. His knowledge of economy and finance led to his immediate appointment General Secretary in the Economics Ministry in the government of Panagis Tsaldaris, and after the royalist October coup of General Georgios Kondylis he was named Labour Minister.

The imposition of the dictatorial Metaxas Regime on 4 August 1936 marked a profound shift in Kartalis' political views: whereas his family had traditionally been conservative monarchists, and Kartalis himself had both campaigned with the royalist People's Party, which had never accepted the establishment of the Second Hellenic Republic (1924–1935), and even held a post in Kondylis' government, which had restored the monarchy, Kartalis now became a convinced republican and was involved in a number of anti-regime initiatives.

== Second World War ==
On the outbreak of the Greco-Italian War on 28 October 1940, Kartalis volunteered for the front. In April/May 1941, however, the German army overran Greece, placing the country under a brutal triple occupation. The first resistance groups began to appear in the summer and autumn of 1941, although the armed resistance movement would not begin until a year later. From October 1941, Kartalis began to meet with several Venizelist and republican Army colonels such as Evripidis Bakirtzis with the view of forming a republican-oriented resistance group. Finally, with the cooperation of Colonel Dimitrios Psarros, the National and Social Liberation (EKKA) movement was founded in early autumn 1942. EKKA aspired to a purely republican regime after the war, including vaguely socialist ideas such as a "socialization" of industry.

EKKA became the third major resistance group after the communist-led Greek People's Liberation Army (ELAS) and the republican National Republican Greek League (EDES), with its own armed force, named after the famed 5/42 Evzone Regiment, being established on 20 April 1943. From the outset however, EKKA came into intense rivalry with ELAS. ELAS forces attacked and dissolved the unit in May 1943, and it was only after sustained political maneuvering and British pressure that it was able to reform in autumn 1943. In his capacity as EKKA's political head, Kartalis went to Cairo from 9 August to 14 September as part of a Greek Resistance delegation for talks with the British and the Greek government in exile. Inside Greece, rivalry with ELAS continued, and in April 1944, ELAS forces attacked and overwhelmed the 5/42 Evzones, capturing and executing Psarros in the process. Kartalis however participated as EKKA's representative in the Lebanon Conference of May 1944, which led to the creation of a national unity government under George Papandreou. In this government, Kartalis held the post of Vice-Minister of Press and Information.

== Post-war career ==
After the country was liberated in October 1944, Papandreou's government was soon faced with the mutual mistrust and rivalry between EAM-ELAS, which controlled most of the country, and the forces of the British-backed government-in-exile, which attracted the support of many of the pre-war political elites. Despite disagreements with Papandreou, Kartalis remained in office as Minister without portfolio from October 1944 to Papandreou's resignation on 3 January 1945, during the Dekemvriana clashes between ELAS and British forces. Kartalis also served as Supply Minister in the government of Themistoklis Sophoulis (November 1945 – April 1946), and in the 1950-1952 Nikolaos Plastiras cabinets as Finance and Government Coordination Minister. His tenure in these last posts was of critical importance for the recovery and stabilization of the Greek economy from the devastations of World War II. His reforms shored up public finances and paved the way for the Greek economic miracle of the 1950s and 1960s.

Together with Alexandros Svolos he founded the Democratic Party of the Working People, but failed to get elected into Parliament in the 1952 elections. He then stood successfully in 1954 as mayor of Volos, holding the office until his re-election into Parliament in 1956. He died of heart failure on 27 September 1957 in London.
