= Dimitrios Psarros =

Greek Army officer and resistance leader during the Axis occupation of Greece

Major General Dimitrios Psarros
- Δημήτριος Ψαρρός
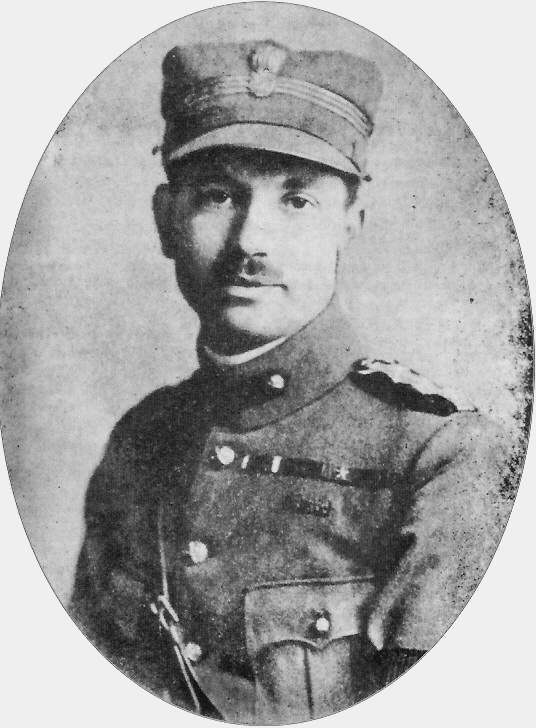
- Dimitrios Psarros in uniform.
- Born: c. 1893; Chryso, Phocis, Kingdom of Greece
- Died: April 17, 1944 (aged 50–51); Klima Efpaliou, Phocis, German-occupied Greece
- Cause of death: Assassination
- Education: Hellenic Military Academy
- Spouse: Niki Psarrou
- Military career
- Allegiance: Kingdom of Greece; (Greece) Provisional Government of National Defence; (Greece) Second Hellenic Republic
- Branch: Hellenic Army; (Greece) EKKA
- Rank: Major General
- Conflicts: Balkan Wars: First Balkan War; Second Balkan War; World War I: Macedonian front; Russian Civil War: Allied intervention in the Russian Civil War; Southern Front; Southern Russia Intervention; Greco-Turkish War (1919–1922); World War II: Battle of Greece; Greco-Italian War; Greek Resistance; Greek Civil War (First Phase) (executed)

Dimitrios Psarros (Greek: Δημήτριος Ψαρρός; 1893 – April 17, 1944) was a Greek army officer, founder and leader of the resistance group National and Social Liberation (EKKA), the third-most significant organization of the Greek Resistance movement after the National Liberation Front (EAM) and the National Republican Greek League (EDES). In 1944, he was executed by Greek communist forces.

== Life ==
Psarros was born in 1893 in the village of Chryso, in the province of Parnassida, Phocis. He attended the Greek Army Academy, and in 1916 he graduated as Second Lieutenant of Artillery.

Psarros first saw action in the Balkan Wars as a volunteer, while still being a cadet in the Army Academy. In 1916 he joined the Venizelist National Defence government. He fought in the Macedonian front of World War I, the Allied intervention in the Russian Civil War (in Crimea) as a Captain, where he was injured, and in the Greco-Turkish War (1919-1922) where, thanks to his bravery, his men were able to pass into Greece from Asia Minor without many casualties. Before the war with the Turks, he was sent to France for superior war studies and after his return of Asia Minor he served in the staff of the Army of Evros, which played a critical role to Greek strategy and politics during these years. Subsequently, he taught in the newly created Greek War Academy. Later, he was among the organizers of the new Ministry of Aviation and served as Chief of Staff of an Army division.

In March 1935 he took part in the failed Venizelist coup d'état. Along with scores of other Venizelist and Republican officers, he was court-martialled and dismissed from the Army, opening the way for the royalist Army leadership to restore the Greek monarchy in October. When Greece entered World War II, he sought re-appointment into the armed forces but was refused by the Ioannis Metaxas dictatorship.

Following the collapse of the front through the German invasion of Greece in April 1941 and the onset of a triple occupation by Germany, Italy and Bulgaria, Psarros first attempted to organise a resistance group in Amfissa with the help of Lt. Andreas Mitalas, but without success. Next he went to Macedonia. There, in July 1941, he co-founded the organization Freedom (Greek: Ελευθερία, Eleftheria) with communists members, which deployed guerilla forces in the area of Nigrita, Lachana, and Kalokastro of Central Macedonia, to fight the Bulgarians, who had followed the Germans into Greece, occupied much of northern Greece and had set their sights on permanent annexation. Unfortunately, Psarros was betrayed to the Axis Forces and was chased by them.

He fled to Athens, where in April 1942 he founded EKKA along with other significant figures such as the politician Georgios Kartalis, Colonel Evripidis Bakirtzis and other army officers like Dimitrios Karachristos and Dimitrios Georgantas. The organisation's aims were to fight the Axis occupation forces as long as the occupation lasted and, after liberation, work for social change, in a social democratic direction. EKKA was also an anti-communist, liberal and Venizelist organisation. EKKA soon fielded its own guerrilla forces, named after the famed 5/42 Evzone Regiment and took action mainly in Central Greece, in the area of Mount Gkiona, but its forces were of small size (around 1,000 fighters at its peak) in comparison to the size of ELAS (with 50,000 fighters at its peak) and EOEA (military arm of EDES, about 14,000 fighters).

== Execution ==
On Easter Monday, April 17, 1944, the 5/42 Regiment was attacked by the forces of ELAS (controlled by the Communist Party of Greece), who sought to have a monopoly in the political future of Greece after liberation, to disarm EKKA and further strengthen its dominant military and political position after the anticipated liberation of Greece. His regiment was dissolved by ELAS and Psarros was executed while in captivity. According to testimonies his executor was the career colonel Efthimios Zoulas (Ευθύμιος Ζούλας). His body lay unburied for several days before it was interred at the local cemetery.

The assassination of Colonel Psarros was a dark point of Greek Resistance era. People of all resistant groups were shocked in the announcement of his death. In 1945 he was promoted posthumously by the Hellenic Army tο the rank of Major General.

== Sources ==
- Solon Grigoriadis, History of Modern Greece 1941–1974, Athens, Polaris
- Dionisis Charitopoulos, Aris, the Leader of the Rebels, Athens, Ellinika Grammata
- Ioannis Papathanasiou, Resistant organization of EKKA
- Special edition of Greek newspaper Eleftherotipia, Occupation and Resistance 1941–1945, 2008
