= National and Social Liberation =

Greek resistance movement against its occupation by Germany and Italy during WWII

- Leaders: Georgios Kartalis; Dimitrios Psarros
- Dates active: 1942–1944
- Active regions: Epirus, Central Greece
- Ideology: Republicanism; Liberalism; Venizelism; Anti-communism; Anti-fascism; Anti-monarchism
- Size: c. 1,500
- Wars: the Greek Resistance

National and Social Liberation (Greek: Εθνική και Κοινωνική Απελευθέρωσις, ΕΚΚΑ; Ethnikí kai Koinonikí Apelefthérosis, EKKA) was a Greek Resistance movement during the Axis occupation of Greece. It was founded in autumn 1942 by Colonel Dimitrios Psarros and politician Georgios Kartalis.

== History ==
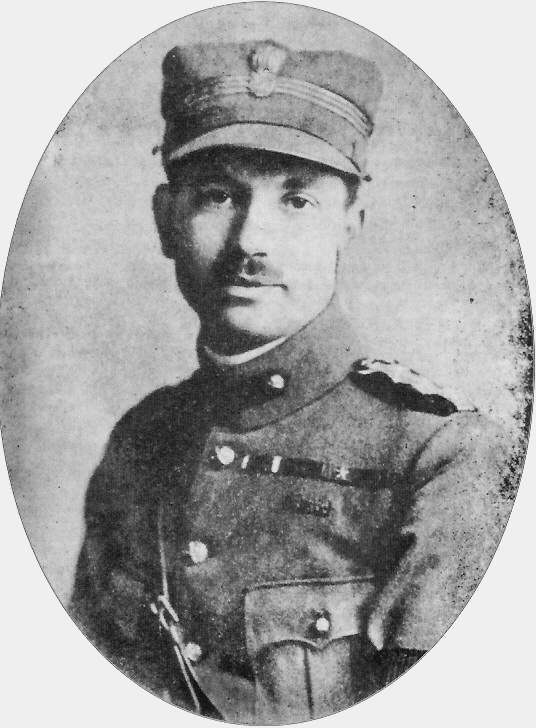
Dimitrios Psarros, military leader of EKKA.

Alongside Psarros and Kartalis, founding members included fellow officers Dimitrios Karachristos, Dimitrios Georgantas and others. The organization's aims were to fight the Germans as long as the occupation lasted and, after Liberation, work for a republican regime and social change.

EKKA's armed wing was the 5/42 Evzone Regiment, founded in early 1943 and named after Psarros' old army unit. It numbered at its peak ca. 1,000 men, and was active mainly in Central Greece, in the area of Phocis. The organization however was from the outset confronted with the might of the communist-led Greek People's Liberation Army (ELAS), which claimed the overall leadership of the Resistance movement and regarded EKKA as reactionary and an anglophile organization. ELAS forces attacked the 5/42 Evzones Regiment on 14 May and 23 June 1943 forcing its dissolution, but bowing to pressure from the British Military Mission, they agreed to allow it to reform within the unifying framework of the so-called "National Bands Agreement" of July 1943. On 29 February 1944, near the bridge of Plaka, the Treaty of Plaka was signed among the EKKA, EAM and EDES.

== Dissolution by ELAS ==
Nevertheless, the rivalry between ELAS and the republican EDES and EKKA groups continued, and on 14 April 1944, the EKKA forces were attacked by ELAS. The 5/42 Evzones Regiment held out for three days, but was then forced to retreat. A number of men managed to escape and cross the Corinthian Gulf to the Peloponnese. The majority however remained behind with Col. Psarros, were taken prisoner and later executed. It remains disputed if Psarros was killed during the battle or in captivity. The event caused a major shock in the Greek political scene since Psarros was a well-known republican, patriot and anti-royalist. The apparent determination of EAM-ELAS to monopolize the resistance movement caused concerns about its post-war intentions, leading to a more decisive opposition from the part of the other resistance groups and the pre-war political establishment. The event is considered a precursor of the Greek Civil War that broke out a year later (see Dekemvriana).

Following the disbandment of the 5/42 Evzones Regiment, EKKA ceased to exist as a military and political factor, although Kartalis himself still participated as its representative, alongside the leaders of the other major Resistance and political groups, in the Lebanon Conference shortly after.

== List of battles ==
1943

- 12–13 September: Battle against Italians and Germans at Lidoriki.
- 15 September: Battle against Germans at Anathema area
- 17 September: Battle against Germans at Tsakorema area
- 4–7 March: Battle of Fardykambos

1944

- 11 January and 1 February: Battles of Gravia-Amfissa

== Sources ==
- Hellenic Army History Directorate (1998). Αρχεία Εθνικής Αντίστασης, 1941–1944. Τόμος 5ος "Αντάρτικες Οργανώσεις ΕΚΚΑ-5/42 ΣΕ", "Αντάρτικες Οργανώσεις Μακεδονίας – Δυτ. Θράκης – Θεσσαλίας", "Αντάρτικες Οργανώσεις Πελοποννήσου" [National Resistance Archives, 1941–1944. 5th Volume "EKKA-5/42 E.R. Partisan Organizations", "Macedonia – West. Thrace – Thessaly Partisan Organizations", "Peloponnese Partisan Organizations"]. Athens: Hellenic Army History Directorate. ISBN 960-7897-33-1.
- Mamarelis, Argyrios (2003), The Special Operations Executive in Greece 1941–1944: The case of the 5/42 Regiment of Evzones (PDF)
- Papastratis, Prokopis (1984), British policy towards Greece during the Second World War, 1941–1944, Cambridge University Press, ISBN 978-0-521-24342-1
- Lymberatos, Michalis P. (2007). "Οι οργανώσεις της Αντίστασης" [The organizations of the Resistance]. In Hatziiosif, Christos; Papastratis, Prokopis (eds.). Ιστορία της Ελλάδας του 20ού αιώνα, Γ' Τόμος: Β' Παγκόσμιος Πόλεμος. Κατοχή – Αντίσταση 1940–1945, Μέρος 2ο. [History of Greece in the 20th Century, Volume III: World War II. Occupation and Resistance 1940–1945, Part 2] (in Greek). Athens: Bibliorama. pp. 9–67. ISBN 978-960-8087-06-4.
- Woodhouse, Christopher Montague (2002), The struggle for Greece, 1941–1949, C. Hurst & Co. Publishers, ISBN 978-1-85065-487-2
