= Eddie Myers =

British Army officer

Edmund Myers
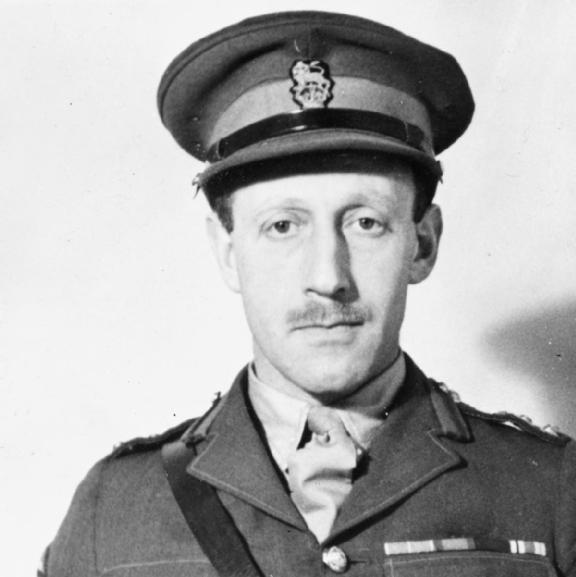
- Born: 12 October 1906; Kensington, London, England
- Died: 6 December 1997 (aged 91); Bourton-on-the-Water, Gloucestershire, England
- Military career
- Allegiance: United Kingdom
- Branch: British Army
- Service years: 1926–1959
- Rank: Brigadier
- Nickname: "Eddie"
- Service number: 36717
- Units: Royal Engineers; Special Operations Executive
- Conflicts: Arab revolt in Palestine; Second World War; Korean War
- Awards: Commander of the Order of the British Empire; Distinguished Service Order; Mentioned in Despatches (2); Bronze Lion (Netherlands); King Haakon VII Freedom Cross (Norway); Legion of Merit (United States)

Brigadier Edmund Charles Wolf Myers, CBE, DSO (12 October 1906 – 6 December 1997) was a British Army officer who fought in the Second World War. Myers was an officer in the Royal Engineers.

== Education and early life ==
Born in Kensington, London, Myers was the son of Charles Samuel Myers, a lecturer in experimental psychology at the University of Cambridge and a consultant psychologist to the British Expeditionary Force during the First World War (and reportedly the first published author to use the term shell shock). He was educated at Haileybury College and the Royal Military Academy, Woolwich, before being commissioned into the Royal Engineers in 1926. A year later he went up to Gonville and Caius College, Cambridge, where he read mechanical sciences (engineering) for two years before returning to the army.

== Military career ==
From October 1942 to early 1944, brevetted first to colonel and then to brigadier, Myers headed the SOE-controlled British Military Mission to occupied Greece. In this capacity, he was directly involved in the coordination of the rival ELAS and EDES partisan groups for the destruction of the Gorgopotamos viaduct in November 1942 (Operation Harling), and for the British destruction of the Asopos railway bridge on 21 June 1943 as part of Operation Animals. Increasingly drawn into the brewing conflict between the Communist-dominated ELAS and the republican EDES, as well as into British designs to restore the unpopular Greek monarchy postwar, Myers was criticised by the Foreign Office for what they believed to be favourable treatment towards ELAS and he was removed from his post. He was succeeded as head of the British mission by his deputy, Chris "Monty" Woodhouse.

Being parachute-qualified, Myers then entered service as Commander Royal Engineers in the 1st Airborne Division. In this capacity he fought at the Battle of Arnhem. Myers was sent across the Rhine on 22 September 1944 to establish contact with the 1st Polish Parachute Brigade. As chief engineer officer, he was responsible for organising the Rhine crossings of the Poles, and finally the evacuation of the remnants of the 1st Airborne Division from Arnhem. During this operation, he was wounded by shrapnel. For his part in the battle, he was awarded the Dutch Bronze Lion.

In 1955, Myers published his memoirs from his time in occupied Greece under the title Greek Entanglement.
