= Kostas Gavriilidis =

Greek politician (1898–1952)

- Κώστας Γαβριηλίδης
- Born: 12 January 1898; Kars Oblast, Russian Empire
- Died: 27 September 1952 (aged 54); Agios Efstratios
- Occupations: Politician; teacher
- Organization(s): National Liberation Front; Political Committee of National Liberation
- Political party: Agrarian Party of Greece; United Democratic Left

Kostas Gavriilidis (12 January 1898 – 27 September 1952) was a Greek teacher, trade unionist and politician. He participated in the farmers social struggles, and he had been MP with the Agrarian Party of Greece and mayor of Kilkis. During the occupation of Greece by the Axis he participated in the Resistance, in the National Liberation Front and he was elected secretary of agriculture in the Political Committee of National Liberation. He died in exile in 1952.

== Biography ==
=== Youth ===
Kostas Gavriilidis was born in 1898 in southern Caucasus in poor agrarian family. He studied to become a teacher, financed by one rich uncle of him, and became a teacher of the Russian language.

During his military service for the Russian Empire the Russian Revolution broke out.

=== Migration to Greece ===
In 1920, his family left Russia and settled in Greece. They settled in the Kokkikia village, near Kilkis. Soon he became mayor of the village and later president of the Union of Agrarian Cooperatives of Kilkis.

Later, he joined the Agrarian Party, and in this context he participated in peasant struggles.

In 1932 he was elected in the parliament in the Thessaloniki regional unit and in 1936 mayor of Kilkis with All People's Front. After the proclamation of the Metaxas dictatorship he was arrested and exiled to Anafi. He escaped, but in 1938 he was arrested again and imprisoned in Kerkyra. Later, during the Axis occupation of Greece he was transferred to the Larissa concentration camp but managed to escape after the retreat of Italian troops from Greece. He joined the National Liberation Front and in spring 1944 he was elected secretary of Agriculture in the Political Committee of National Liberation.

=== After the liberation of Greece ===
After the signing of the treaty of Varkiza, Gavriilidis was arrested during the White terror and exiled to Icaria, Makronisos and finally to Agios Efstratios.

He was elected to the parliament in the September 1951 elections, along with 6 other political prisoners, but their being elected was cancelled by a court and they remained in exile.

In September 1952, he suffered a stroke and, after the authorities refused to transfer him to a hospital, he died.
