= Evripidis Bakirtzis =

Greek politician (1895–1947)

Evripidis Bakirtzis DSO
- Ευριπίδης Μπακιρτζής
- Evripidis Bakirtzis, Chairman of the PEEA, addresses the National Council in Evrytania, May 1944.
- Born: Evripidis Bakirtzis; 16 January 1895; Serres, Salonika Vilayet, Ottoman Empire (now Greece)
- Died: 9 March 1947 (aged 52); Fournoi Korseon, Kingdom of Greece
- Education: Hellenic Army Academy
- Military career
- Allegiance: Kingdom of Greece; Second Hellenic Republic; EAM
- Branch: Hellenic Army; ELAS
- Service years: 1911–1926; 1928–1937; 1940–1944
- Rank: Colonel
- Nickname: "The Red Colonel"
- Units: Army of Epirus; ELAS-Divisional Group of Macedonia (DGM)
- Commands: 2nd Staff Office; 3rd Army Corps; PEEA
- Conflicts: Balkan Wars; First Balkan War; Battle of Bizani; World War I; Macedonian Front; Battle of Skra-di-Legen; Greco-Turkish War (1919–1922); Battle of the Sakarya; 11 September 1922 Revolution; Leonardopoulos–Gargalidis coup attempt; 1935 Greek coup attempt; World War II; Greco-Italian War; German invasion of Greece; Greek Resistance
- Awards: Distinguished Service Order

Evripidis Bakirtzis (Greek: Ευριπίδης Μπακιρτζής; 16 January 1895 – 9 March 1947), born in Serres, Ottoman Empire, was a Hellenic Army officer and politician. Dismissed from the army twice due to his participation in pro-republican coup attempts and sentenced to death, later during the Axis Occupation of Greece, in World War II he co-founded the National and Social Liberation (EKKA) resistance group along with Dimitrios Psarros and was the military head of the organization. He later joined and was a prominent member of the National Liberation Front (EAM) and its military wing the Greek People's Liberation Army (ELAS). He served as head of the Political Committee of National Liberation (PEEA), a government of Greek Resistance-held territories also called the "Mountain Government", from 10 March to 18 April 1944. He was nicknamed "the Red Colonel", from his pen name in the newspaper of the Communist Party of Greece, the Rizospastis.

He was found dead in 1947 in exile, during the later Greek Civil War, in Fournoi Korseon.

== Early life ==
He was the son of the secretary of the Greek consulate of Serres (in 1895 Serres belonged to the Ottoman Empire) Christos Bakirtzis and the teacher, Efthalias Zaka, of the well-known family of Grevena, with a military tradition in the Greek War of Independence. In addition to his sister, Marika, he had two half-brothers, one of whom was a distinguished Makedonomachos warrior, nicknamed "Nikos o Serraios", and the other was executed by the Bulgarians in Serres in 1916.

== Military career ==
In 1911, Bakirtzis was admitted to the Hellenic Army Academy and participated in the First Balkan War, in 1912, as a sophomore. Specifically, he served in the Army of Epirus with the Independent Cretan Regiment, as a sergeant. In August 1914, the outbreak of World War I and the subsequent manifestation of the National Schism, which occurred due to the dispute between Eleftherios Venizelos and King Constantine over the foreign policy pursued, found Bakirtzis serving in Kavala with his rank Artillery. From the beginning of 1916 until the occupation of most of the forts of eastern Macedonia in the same year by the Germans and Bulgarians, with the simultaneous evacuation of the rural areas by the Greek population, Bakirtzis, not tolerating the upcoming surrender of the Fourth Army Corps, decided to fight for the preservation of Macedonia in the Greek national body. He signed with the Venizelos officers of the National Defense, assuming command of artillery and then commander of artillery squadron. He was one of the first defenders and distinguished himself in the battle of Skra, winning the British military medal (Distinguished Service Order). Later, in 1919, he went on a scholarship for three years to France, where he studied at the Higher School of War, leading among 380 distinguished officers from allied countries. Later, he returned to Greece, at war with Turkey, and fought in Asia Minor. In 1922, now in the rank of major, he participated in the Revolutionary Committee of Plastiras that overthrew King Constantine I after the Asia Minor Catastrophe. With the entry of the revolutionary forces in Athens, he went to Evros, collaborated in the defensive line of the front and was the trainer of the famous Evros Army. Later, with the rank of lieutenant colonel, as Chief of the Artillery in Asvestochori, Thessaloniki, dealt with reorganization and reorganization of the Greek Army.

In October 1923, when the Leonardopoulos-Gargalidis Movement broke out, Bakirtzis, along with other loyal government officials, such as Georgios Kondylis, Stefanos Sarafis, Dimitrios Psarros, etc., were informed in advance that the movements were the situation in their hands, before the manifestation of the movement in the city of Thessaloniki. They then confronted the military forces led by Colonel George Ziras against the city and forced them to surrender. In 1926, as a lieutenant colonel, he was arrested and sentenced to death, as one of the leaders of the military coup of Tzavela-Bakirtzis, but was not executed. In 1928 he returned to the army and in 1930–31, with the rank of colonel, he served as a military attaché in Sofia and Bucharest. There he was honored with the senior Brigadiers of Bulgaria and Romania. He returned to Greece and took over the management of the 2nd Staff Office (Information) of the General Staff. He also served as chief of staff of the 3rd Army Corps. In 1935, now a colonel, he took part in the Movement of March 1, 1935. He was arrested and sentenced to death for the second time, but his sentence was eventually commuted to deportation from the army and exile to Agios Efstratios (June 25, 1935). He stayed there for a year. He was later demoted to the rank of ordinary soldier and exiled to Antikythera, where his detention conditions were very bad and dangerous to his health. In 1937, he moved to Athens and the Metaxas government asked him to cooperate with the dictatorship and offered him a high position in the General Staff. He refused and was allowed to leave for Bucharest immediately, without having the right to move from there. In fact, he is deprived of his salary and the money of the Share Fund but fortunately his son-in-law, doctor Alexandros Dimitriadis, had support. In Bucharest he wrote three excellent studies that were first published in the book by Euripides Bakirtzis, published by Epikairotia, under the supervision of his exile detainee, Nikos Margaris. These were The Military Value of Greece, The Countries of the Lower Danube and The New Turkey. Especially for the latter, the Turkish ambassador in Bucharest conveyed the congratulations of his government.

== World War II and resistance ==
With the declaration of the Greek-Italian War in 1940, Bakirtzis returned to Greece and presented himself at the Military Office of Thessaloniki to join the army with the rank of ordinary soldier, something that was not accepted by the government of Ioannis Metaxas.

Toward the beginning of the war, Bakirtzis joined the Greek resistance and one of his first missions included sabotage of Italian forces in Albania which was intended to garner more widespread support for resistance from the left and the right of Greece. He was also the first military liaison between the British and the Greeks, during the Occupation, he led an operation codenamed Prometheus I. He led a 50-man unit of trained saboteurs under the command of General Alexander Zannas and they were to receive wireless sets to receive instructions from a British SOE agent in Turkey but the Greek ship transporting them was sunk by enemy action. Before this Bakirtzis was chief of staff to General Plastiras who was the Greek military attache in Sofia and Bucharest and the director of military intelligence. Bakirtzis, among a number of other Hellenic Army officers, adopted more socialist ideals after facing persecution from the former Greek government.

On March 10, 1944, the EAM established the PEEA with the goal to counter both the former Greek Government in exile in Cairo and the Greek government which was a collaborationist power for the Axis Powers. During the leadership of Bakirtzis, the PEEA gained significant legitimacy when it was recognized by the National Council (Greek: Εθνικό Συμβούλιο). However, it did face issues from a lack of support from prior political leaders.

Alexandros Svolos, a law professor at the University of Athens took over as the head of the PEEA on April 18, 1944, and Bakirtzis took a lower position within the organization.

On October 30, 1944, ELAS units, led by Markos Vafeiades and Evripidis Bakirtzis, liberated Thessaloniki from the Germans. In September 1944, the Caserta Agreement was signed and that placed all Greek resistance forces under the command of British Major-General Ronald Scobie. This caused tension among the ranks of the KKE and ELAS which was eased by Bakirtzis. Around this time Bakirtzis was leading a division of the ELAS called the Divisional Group of Macedonia (DGM). The liberation of Thessaloniki from the German occupiers is a special case, because, despite the Caserta Agreement, which stipulated the handing over of power to the British and the British General Ronald Scobie (as took place in Athens and other cities), here the surrender took place to the Greek forces. Thus, despite the order of Scobie, but also of the commander of ELAS, Stefanos Sarafis, to keep the guerrilla forces on the outskirts of the city and wait for the landing of the British, the leaders of the DGM, Markos Vafiadis and Evripizidis ignored the agreement. On the morning of October 30, they allowed the entry of ELAS military units into the city, which occupied, since October 26, its peripheral districts, tightening the siege of the Germans. In the morning, the leadership of the guerrilla groups settled in Villa Moskov, in the Old Town of Thessaloniki. The withdrawal of the last German soldiers was completed in the afternoon without endangering the city, apart from the explosion of a port pier. As of noon, as soon as the danger from the retreating Germans disappeared, the crowd poured into the city and enthusiastically welcomed the paradeers of the 11th Division of ELAS. Bakirtzis remained in Northern Greece until the surrender of the weapons and for a time in Thessaloniki.

=== Division among resistance groups ===
In May 1944, the Axis Occupation was drawing down and there were negotiations between the Greeks, British, and Soviets regarding the future of the Balkans in the Lebanon Conference. The PEEA agreed to the terms of this agreement without condition on August 15, 1944, but there were disagreements from the PEEA and the Greek Communist Party (KKE) that they were convinced to abandon by a Soviet military mission which talked with Bakirtzis and other officials. During this meeting, Soviet officer Nikolai Chernichev told Bakirtzis that refusing to agree to the terms in the Lebanon agreement would be "illogical".

Later in 1944, there emerged an ideological split within the ranks of the KKE and Communism as a whole between the Stalinists, led by Nikos Zachariadis and the Titoists, led by Vafeiades and it was described as a purely ideological dispute, mostly in regards to what the strategy of the party should be. Zachariadis and the Stalinists wanted to establish a regular army while Vafeiades and the Titoists favored guerilla-style tactics and this led Vafeiades to often defy party directives and leadership. The Titoists did have an ally in Tito who pushed for intervention in the Greek Civil War but the Stalinists in the party eventually won out but their side ultimately lost the war. It was at one point a bad thing to be called a Titoist within the ranks of the KKE and Vafeiadis denied ever having direct contact with Tito. There was one incident in which Bakirtzis, along with Markos Vafeiades, signed an order to liquidate a number of “Slavo-Macedonian” battalions which had decided to fight for Yugoslavia. Ultimately however, the split had no overall impact on the internal structures of the party and of its leadership, it merely served as a basis to assign blame after the defeat in the war.

== Exile and death ==
Permanent officers who had served in ELAS were kept away from the new post-war army. In the summer of 1946, during the second ten days of August, almost all of them were displaced to the Aegean islands. In September 1946, Bakirtzis was arrested as a leftist along with other ELAS leaders (Stefanos Sarafis, Giannis Mousterakis) and exiled to Agios Kirikos, the capital of Icaria. While in exile, the prefect of Attica deemed him a danger to public order and security and ordered his transfer to Fourni, Ikaria. In February 1947, the Greek government allowed him to testify before a United Nations commission investigating the state of the civil war in Greece. Shortly after the visit he received, he was found dead in his room in Fourni, Ikaria, on May 9, 1947, with a bullet in his heart and was buried there. The steps taken by his family and co-exiles to transport his body to Athens to investigate the circumstances of his death and to be buried near his family did not bear fruit. The causes of his death remain unknown. Officially, his death was recorded as suicide.

New title	Chairman of the Political Committee of National Liberation; March 10 – April 18, 1944	Succeeded by Alexandros Svolos
