= Maria Svolou =

Greek feminist and socialist leader

Svolou speaking to guerrillas during World War II

Maria Svolou (Greek: Μαρία Σβώλου, née Desypri (Δεσύπρη); c. 1892 – 3 June 1976) was a Greek feminist and socialist leader.

== Biography ==
Maria Desypri was born around 1892 in Athens to George Desypros and his wife. Maria was one of four daughters and lived for two years in Piraeus. She moved with her family to Larissa in her youth when her father was appointed director of a branch of the Greek National Bank. There she studied at the Arsakeion School of Larissa, graduating around 1907. Following the death of her father in 1915, the family returned to Athens. She received a certificate in French Studies in 1916 and a license for teaching French from the Ecclesiastical and Public Education Ministries in 1919.

Svolou was active in the women's movement of Greece from a young age. She married law professor Alexandros Svolos in 1923. As secretary of the League for Women's Rights she advocated for the creation of night schools for women who worked and fought against prostitution. She campaigned and wrote on behalf of equality for the women of Greece. She was inspector of labor for the Ministry of Economics and used her position there to draw attention the poor working and housing conditions of impoverished working women.

Svolou was involved in liberal politics from 1911 to 1936 and supported the peace movement. She was editor of the magazine Woman's Struggle and was exiled from Greece from 1936 to 1940 with her husband by dictator Ioannis Metaxas. Svolou was a leader of the liberal feminist movement but believed that gender equality could only be attained after fundamental societal change. She returned to Greece in 1940 and volunteered in the Greco-Italian War as a nurse. She later organised meals with the Red Cross for children during the German occupation of Greece. Svolou joined the EAM-ELAS resistance movement and was elected a member of the National Council, while her husband became chairman of the EAM-led Political Committee of National Liberation. Svolou sympathised with the Communists and was exiled again in 1948, during the Greek Civil War. Following her return she ran for the Parliament as a member of the United Democratic Left. She was elected twice and was a member of the party's Central Committee.
