= Panagiotis Sophianopoulos =

Greek doctor and rebel (c. 1786–1856)

Panagiotis Sophianopoulos (c. 1786, Sopoto, Kalavryta – 1856, Syros) was a Greek medical doctor, a member of the "Society of Friends" and a fighter during the Greek rebellion of 1821. He was also a publisher, a politician and a supporter of liberal opinions. He was excoriated and sent to jail because of his actions and ideas.

== Biography ==
=== Pre-revolution period ===
Sophianopoulos was born in Sopoto of Kalavryta in about 1786 and originates from Constantinople. He studied medicine first in Italy and then in Paris, while in 1813 he returned to the Peloponnese where he worked as a doctor in Patras and Lagadia, gaining considerable fame. In 1819 he was initiated by Aristides Papa into the Society of Friends, in which he was active with the rank of apostle.

=== In the revolution ===
With the outburst of the Greek Revolution he served as a doctor in the revolutionary troops. During the first period of the revolution he followed Dimitrios Ipsilantis, while later he served as secretary to Yannis Gouras and advisor to I. Kolettis. In the civil war he sided with the government forces, even accompanying the Rumeliotian troops in their campaign against the Peloponnese at the end of 1824. For his action during that period, Sophianopoulos received many accusations which include among other the torture of Sotiris Notaras, the priest Joachim during the raid on Gastouni (the seat of George Sisinis) and the Paleon Patron Yiermanos.

=== Within the framework of the Greek State ===
From 1826 to 1832 he lived in France where he was influenced by the progressive ideas of Saint-Simon and Fourier. He returned to Greece and in 1834 he settled in Athens, and that same year he was appointed doctor in Locris and Phocis. In the following years he published the journal "Progress" (weekly or fortnightly, published from July 1836 to 1854) and the newspapers Socrates (1838-1848) and New World (1849-1854). In 1842 he reprinted the translations of Korais concerning Cesare Becaria's work "On Offences and Penalties and the Complete Works of Isocrates".

The modernist ideas of Sofianopoulos provoked the reaction of the social elite and the Church. Due to the fact that he published articles that violated the Press Law, he was involved in several legal disputes. Indeed, in 1838, because of an article in issue 25 of the Proodos which was considered to be directed against King Otto and the government, he was sentenced to a seven-month imprisonment and a fine of 500 drachmas. After his appeal was dismissed he served his sentence in the prisons of Athens and Nafplio. Later, in May 1844, the Holy Synod excommunicated his book "The Evangelism of progress" on the grounds that it contained expressions offensive to the doctrine of orthodoxy, the Holy Spirit and the Virgin Mary.

Sofianopoulos was also involved in politics, as in the summer of 1845 he was a candidate with the party of Kolettis in the by-elections of the Kalavryta region, where although he managed to be elected he never exercised his duties as in October of the same year the elections were cancelled. He died in Syros in 1856 shortly after his release from the Anglo-French occupation forces. His brother was Nikoletus, a fighter of 1821 and his descendant was the politician Ioannis Sofianopoulos.

== Views ==
In his articles Sophianopoulos turned against the powerful of the earth, accusing them of never caring for the people. For society he argued that it should be formed as a companion society, the purpose of which would be to transform the state into a companion constitutional organization that would satisfy the needs of the people, solve their living and educational needs and make them happy as the Executive power of the ruling people would have factories, shops and schools of agriculture, chowkers. ..and in general industrial factories of all those crafts which were and are invented for the multiplication, perfection and increase of the natural and rational powers of man.

Sofianopoulos, who is considered the first Greek feminist, argued that the differences between women and men, which were inspired by superstition and hypocrisy, should be abolished:"Women need to govern human societies together with men".
