= Treaty of Varkiza =

1945 peace treaty in Greece

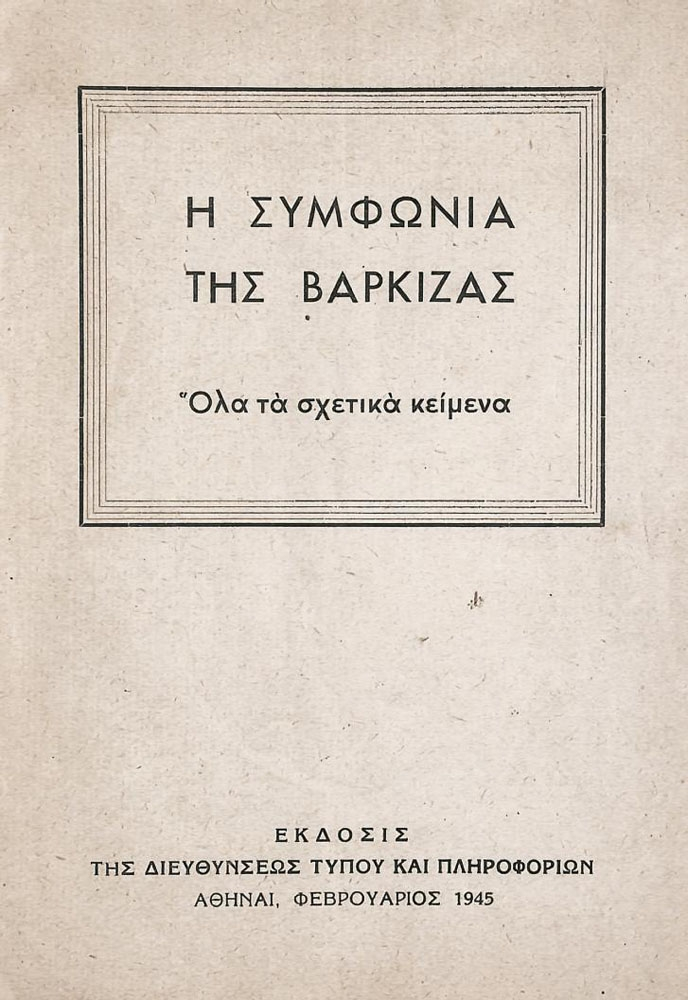
The Varkiza Agreement

The Treaty of Varkiza (Greek: Συμφωνία της Βάρκιζας, also known as the Varkiza Pact or the Varkiza Peace Agreement) was signed in Varkiza (near Athens) on February 12, 1945, between the Greek Minister of Foreign Affairs and the Secretary of the Communist Party of Greece (KKE) for EAM-ELAS, following the latter's defeat during the Dekemvriana clashes. One of the aspects of the accord (Article IX) called for a plebiscite to be held within the year in order to resolve any problems with the Greek Constitution. This plebiscite would help establish elections and thus create a constituent assembly that would draft a new organic law. In another aspect of the treaty, both signatories agreed to have the Allies deploy overseers within the country, who would ensure the legitimacy of the elections. The accord also promised that members of the EAM-ELAS would be permitted to participate in political activities if they surrendered their weapons. Moreover, all civil and political liberties would be guaranteed along with the undertaking by the Greek government towards establishing a nonpolitical national army.

== Disarmament ==
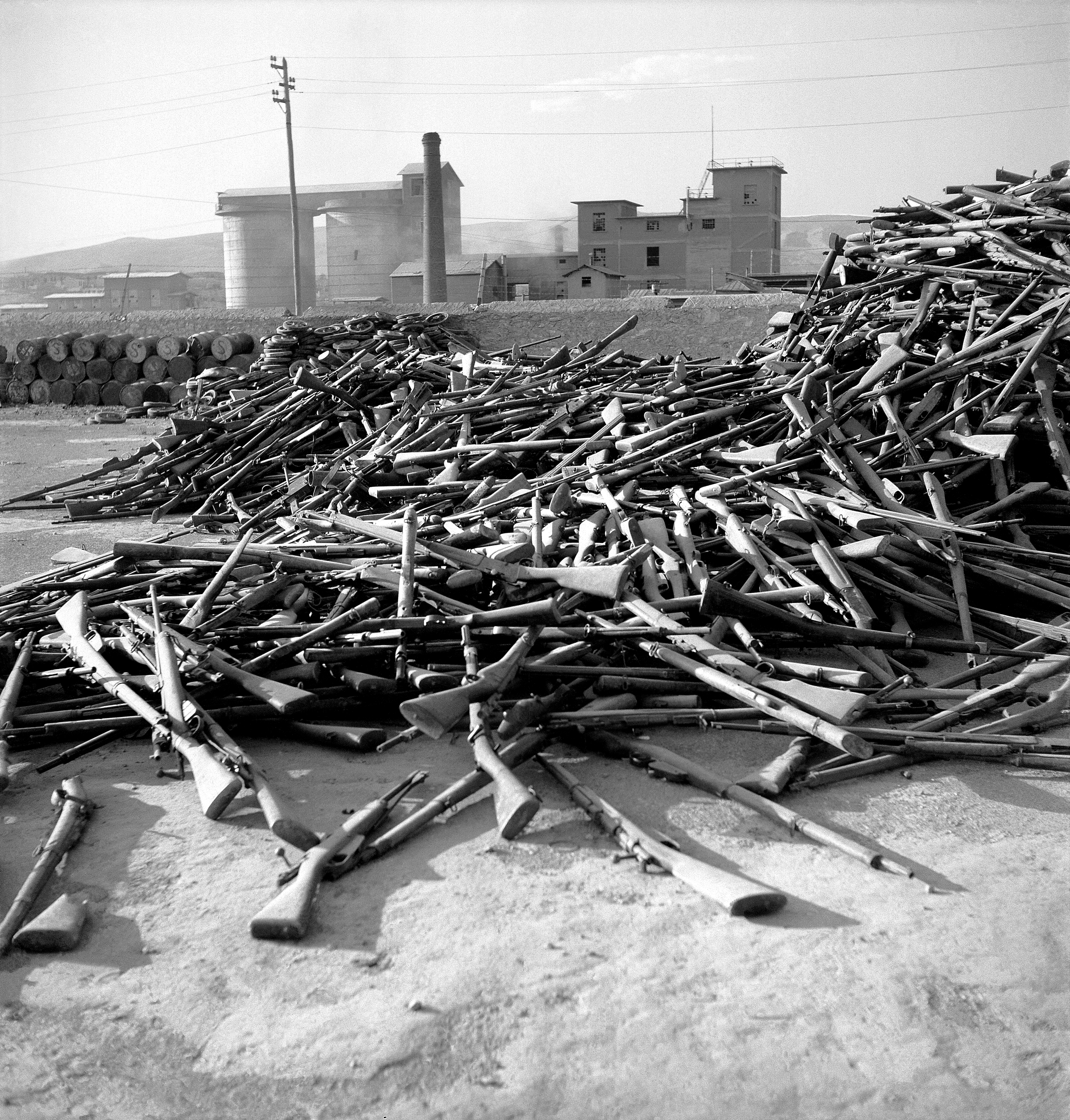
Arms surrendered

The treaty specified the disarmament of EAM-ELAS, which, according to records, surrendered within the next few days or weeks 100 artillery pieces of various types, 81 heavy mortars, 138 light mortars, 419 machine guns, 1,412 submachine guns, 713 automatic rifles, 48,973 rifles and pistols, 57 antitank rifles and 17 radios.

However, the real numbers were higher, as receipts for weapons were sometimes refused. Panagiotis Koumoukelis relates in 'All That Grief' that he refused a receipt for his gun and that since he could not produce his receipt, he was tortured by members of the Security Battalions.

== Aftermath ==
Ultimately, the promises enshrined in the Treaty of Varkiza were not upheld. The main problem was that the treaty gave amnesty only for political reasons, but many of the actions by communists during the Dekemvriana were viewed as nonpolitical. After the signing of the treaty, there was widespread persecution of communists and former EAM members and supporters over the next two years. This period, immediately prior to the outbreak of the Greek Civil War, was known as the White Terror.

The Communist Party of Greece remained legal during the Greek Civil War until 27 December 1947.

== Negotiators ==
Greek Government
Name	Portfolio
Ioannis Sofianopoulos	Minister for Foreign Affairs (Greece)
Periklis Rallis	Ministry of the Interior (Greece)
Pafsanias Katsotas	Military Advisor of the Greek Government
Left-wing forces
Name	Portfolio
Georgios Siantos	General Secretary of the Communist Party of Greece
Ilias Tsirimokos	General Secretary of the Socialist Party of Greece
Dimitrios Partsalidis	Secretary of the Central Committee of EAM
Stefanos Sarafis	Military Advisor of EAM

== See also ==
- List of treaties

== Sources ==
- Xydis, Stephen G. "Greece and the Yalta Declaration." American Slavic and East European Review. Vol. 20, No. 1, (February 1961), pp. 6–24.
- Stavrianos, L. S. and Panagopoulos, E. P. "Present-Day Greece." The Journal of Modern History. Vol. 20, No. 2, (June 1948), pp. 149–158.
- C.M. Woodhouse "The Apple of Discord: A Survey of Recent Greek Politics in their International Setting (London 1948)308-310
- Richter, Heinz "British Intervention in Greece, From Varkiza to Civil War February 1945 to August 1946" (London 1986)
