= Periklis =

Periklis (Greek: Περικλής) is a given name. People with the name include:

- Periklis Pierrakos-Mavromichalis
- Periklis Amanatidis
- Periklis Rallis
- Periklis Panagopoulos
- Periklis Damaskos
- Periklis Dorkofikis
- Periklis Kakousis
- Periklis Iakovakis
- Periklis Papapostolou
- Periklis Tsirigotis
- Periklis Korovesis
- Periklis Papapetrou
- Periklis Christoforidis
- Periklis Pantazis
- Periklis Argyropoulos
- Periklis Ilias
- Periklis Sakellarios
- Periklis Bousinakis
- Periklis Kallidopoulos
