= Socialist Party of Greece =

Socialist Party of Greece Σοσιαλιστικό Κόμμα Ελλάδας
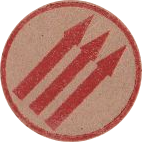
- Founded: 1920
- Dissolved: 1953
- Split from: Socialist Labour Party of Greece
- Merged into: Democratic Party of Working People
- Ideology: Socialism; Republicanism; Svolism; Anti-fascism; Left-wing nationalism
- Political position: Left-wing
- International affiliation: Labour and Socialist International

The Socialist Party of Greece (Greek: Σοσιαλιστικό Κόμμα Ελλάδας, ΣΚΕ; SKE) was a political party in Greece.

== History ==
The party was formed in 1920, as an anti-Comintern minority split away at the second congress of the Socialist Labour Party of Greece. The group that founded the Greek Socialist Party was led by A. Sideris. The party was active in trade unions, and in 1931 the leading party member Dimitris Stratis was elected General Secretary of the General Confederation of Greek Workers (G.S.E.E.).

The party was a member of the Labour and Socialist International between 1923 and 1931, and again in 1933.

In 1931, a group broke away from the party and founded the Independent Socialist Party. Stratis was the leader of the splinter party. The Independent Socialist Party was very short-lived, though, and the following year Stratis returned to the Socialist Party and became a member of its Central Committee.

During the Second World War, the party launched the Union of People's Democracy (E.L.D.) as a front for resistance activities. E.L.D. was a minor resistance group compared to the communist-led National Liberation Front (E.A.M.). The Socialist Party member Alexandros Svolos became appointed President in the government formed by the Greek resistance in 1944.

In February 1949, the Socialist Party broke its links with the Communist Party of Greece. In the 1952 elections, however, it suffered a defeat.

In September 1953, the party merged with the Democratic Party, forming the Democratic Party of Working People. Two months later, socialists founded the Greek Socialist League as a platform for socialist politics within the new party.
