= Manolis Mantakas =

Greek Army officer

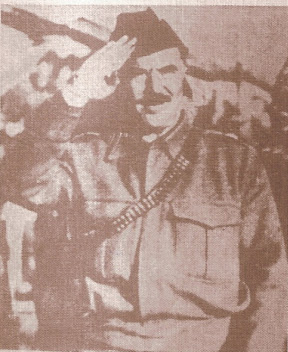
- Emmanuel Mandakas, photo of unknown author circa 1943

Member of Hellenic Parliament for Piraeus
- In office March 5, 1950 – November 16, 1952

Secretary for Military Affairs of the Mountain Government
- In office April 10, 1944 – October 9, 1944

Personal details
- Born: 1891 Lakkoi, Chania, Crete, Ottoman Empire
- Died: 1968 (aged 76–77) Athens, Greece
- Resting place: First Cemetery of Athens
- Party: United Democratic Left; Democratic Alignment
- Education: École Supérieure de Guerre
- Occupation: Politician, army officer

Military service
- Allegiance: Greece
- Branch/service: Greek People's Liberation Army; Hellenic Army
- Years of service: 1941-1945 (Greek People's Liberation Army); 1910-1935 (Hellenic Army)
- Rank: Major General (Hellenic Army)
- Battles/wars: World War Two; Greek Resistance; Greco-Turkish War; Asia Minor Campaign; World War One; Macedonian front; Battle of Skra-di-Legen (WIA); Second Balkan War; First Balkan War; Battle of Sarantaporo (WIA)

Emmanouil or Manolis Mantakas (Greek: Μανώλης Μάντακας, Lakkoi, 1891 – Athens, 1968) was a Greek Army officer who rose to the rank of major general, and who became a leader in the Greek Resistance and a politician.

== Biography ==
He was born in Lakkoi, Chania in 1891 and joined the Hellenic Army in 1910. He fought in the Balkan Wars and took part in the Movement of National Defence. He studied as a staff officer in the École Supérieure de Guerre and fought in the Asia Minor Campaign. A staunch republican, he was dismissed from the Army after the royalist coup of 1 October 1935, and took part in the abortive 1938 uprising in Chania against the dictatorial Metaxas Regime. During World War II he became a leader in the Cretan Resistance and joined the Communist-controlled National Liberation Front and the Greek People's Liberation Army resistance groups. He also served in the EAM-organized government of "Free Greece", the Political Committee of National Liberation, as secretary for military affairs and later as its vice-president, and was elected a deputy for Piraeus Prefecture in the PEEA's parliament, the "National Council".

Due to his communist affiliation, he was exiled to Makronisos in 1947–1949, during the Greek Civil War, but after his release was elected as an MP for Piraeus Prefecture with the Democratic Alignment in the 1950 and with the United Democratic Left in 1951.
