= Lebanon Conference =

1944 Greek government conference

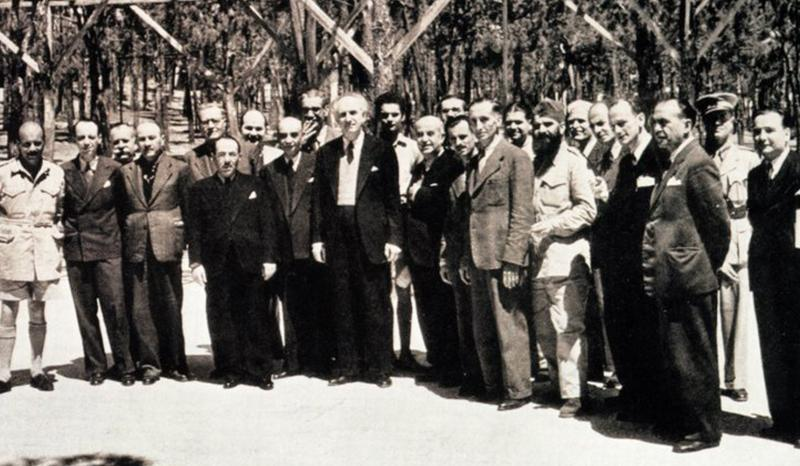
Commemorative photograph after the end of the conference. From left to right they are: Georgios Kartalis (in the short military uniform), next to him Spyridon Theotokis, Ioannis Sofianopoulos, in the center Georgios Papandreou, behind him the tallest on the left, Miltiadis Porfyrogenis, next to Papandreou, Alexandros Svolos and next to him Petros Rousos. On the right with the beard and in military uniform, Komninos Piromaglou, next to him Panagiotis Kanellopoulos.

The Lebanon Conference (Greek: Συνέδριο του Λιβάνου) (May 17–20 1944) was a conference between the leaders of the Greek political parties and Resistance organizations, that took place in Beirut, Lebanon, aiming at forming a national unity government for the country following the end of the Axis occupation of Greece.

== Historical context ==
During World War II, Greece, following the early victorious battles on the Albanian front (October 1940 – April 1941) was unable to cope with the parallel invasions of the Germans and the Bulgarians, resulting on one hand, the legitimate Tsouderos government together with the royal family and the combat forces of the navy and the air force to pass through Crete to Egypt in order to continue the resistance with the allied British forces stationed there, on the other hand, the country to be completely occupied by the enemy, from the end of May 1941 until October 1944, when it was liberated following the withdrawal of the Germans.

During this time, in the country many forces of national resistance were formed, more than 15, which was regarded a relative large number in relation to the area and the population of Greece. Chief among those forces was EAM, the biggest organization of the resistance struggle, which was formed from the alliance of parties with the main one being the Communist Party of Greece (KKE), EDES under general Zervas and EKKA under colonel Psarros.

However, before liberation, due to civil conflicts that were observed among the resistance groups, but other forces as well, the formation of a national conference that would harmonize the views and cooperation of all political forces and resistance organizations on a common goal, that was the smooth return of public life in Greece, become urgent and necessary.

Initially, the man responsible to organize the conference was Emmanouil Tsouderos' replacement, himself having gone to London, Sofoklis Venizelos (who had become president at the exiled Government S. Venizelos (1944)).

However, on April 14, 1944, Georgios Papandreou arrived at Cairo, via Turkey on an RAF plane and with the intervention of the British, within 13 days, took over the organization of the said conference for the next 20 days, also assuming on April 26, 1944, the position of Prime Minister pushing S. Venizelos aside and forming the new (exiled) Government of Georgios Papandreou.

Examining the overall context in which the Lebanon Conference was held, with the information that came to light later, it is established that, until May 1944, even though the end of the war was in sight, the allies had not clarified their positions on the liberated areas. On one hand, the Soviet Union, adhering to the allied unity, was aiming firstly at eradicating Nazism from Germany and its dissolution. In fact, to that end on its behalf, the dissolvement of the Third International took place. On the contrary, Churchill saw imperialist motives from Stalin in undermining games against the allies, taking into account the installment of communism in Yugoslavia and the events in Greece and its army in the Middle East.

Churchill wanting to ensure British control over the broader Mediterranean area and especially Greece, appeared determined to even reach a point of shattering the alliance's unity, when on May 4, 1944, notes to Eden:

... We are obviously being led to a confrontation with the Russians, because of their communist plots in Italy, Yugoslavia and Greece... Are we really willing to consent to the installment of communism in the Balkans and Italy? Please consider recalling our ambassador from Moscow for talks. At this moment in time it would create a good gap in our relationships with the Russians... (It is noted that in diplomacy recalling an ambassador for talks, is considered a first step of diplomatic tension, up to and including the severance of relations).

Immediately, on the next day, May 5, Churchill returned even more ruthless, noting to Eden: "... We have to achieve a break with EAM, before it is attached too much to the soviets. We will have to, if possible, create such a gap that it will make the soviets understand that they will have to consider it very seriously before the make any decision. The F.O. (Foreign Office) must devise the most powerful attack against EAM, so that it can be openly denounced. It cannot be given any help, weapons of any kind, or supplies. All our help should be given to Zervas and it should be increased. They are the most treacherous, filthy beasts, I have ever read about in official documents, and that goes a long way."

Let me know if you agree with all of this so that we can very soon formulate our policy. I suppose that now that they have been invited to join the new government, a short break is necessary. In the meantime, let's prepare our cannons, since and you should be sure, that we will reach a rupture with EAM and clash with Russia over it.

== Preliminary arrangements ==
=== Preliminary claims - EAM's terms. ===
In the preliminary discussions, before the start of the Conference's proceedings, the contrast between EAM and the other forces became apparent. The delegations of EAM, PEEA and KKE - which included among others P. Rousos from KKE, Miltiadis Porfyrogenis (also a leading member of KKE) from EAM, A. Svolos, A. Angelopoulos from PEEA, as well as the leader of ELAS, Stefanos Sarafis - sought five conditions as "minimum demands" for the formation of a government of national unity, which were:

1. 50% of the ministries of the national unity government being formed, should be granted to EAM and especially the Ministry of Interior and the Deputy Ministry of Military Affairs.
2. Vice president of the government will be A. Svolos.
3. A team of this government should be installed in Greece as soon as possible.
4. Formation of a unified Army with a commander in chief of common trust, and
5. Appointment of a regency, until a referendum is held.

All the other political forces objected to these demands fearing that this way, the government would be under the effective control of EAM.

=== The movement in Egypt and the EAM repudiation ===
Arriving in Lebanon the seven-member delegation of EAM gave a resounding repudiation of the entire insurgent movement up to that point, in particular the navy, that had taken place in Alexandria of Egypt, and which in the meantime had been suppressed by Sofoklis Venizelos. This was included in a telegram he sent from Beirut, on May 14 1944, personally addressed to Churchill where among others proclaimed:

...The resistance and bloody struggle of the Greek people in the cities and mountains was such that it surpasses in moral significance the irresponsible actions of foolish individuals, which, although stemming from the desire for national unity, led to deplorable and disastrous results that must be condemned by all....

A similar telegram was sent, on the same day, to the then president of the USA, Franklin Roosevelt with which the committee assured of the commitment of the Greeks to the allied struggle. These telegrams appear to have been signed by A. Svolos, M. Porfyrogenis and P. Rousos.

Later, P. Rousos, who at the time was representing KKE, justified this act as necessary due to the disadvantageous position that KKE found itself in after the uprising of the navy, which at the time that it happened, served more the enemies and in fact on foreign land, which was vital however for England. In this statement of his, repeating the critical statements of Churchill and Roosevelt on the uprising and placing the blame on the "foolish organizers" concluded "With these actions we definitely changed the atmosphere to a great extent."

== Conference ==
Lebanon was determined as the place of the Conference and specifically the restaurant of the hotel "Boulogne Forest", at Dhour el Shweir a mountainous, tree-lined resort in Beirut. The date for the beginning of proceedings was May 17 1944. The delegates that represented the resistance organizations of Greece, after being picked up from the Fairy airport, arrived in Beirut, on RAF warplanes via Italy, while the participants of the exiled Papandreou government and of the former S. Venizelou arrived similarly from Cairo.

Upon arrival at the said hotel, the delegations were effectively placed under British "gentle custody" isolated from the outside world, without even the possibility of correspondence, in order to remain unaffected by external events and perceptions.

On the morning of May 17, taking the stand first the presiding Georgios Papandreou launched a fierce attack against EAM, which he accused of aiming to seize power with a coup after the war. The recent attacks of ELAS against other resistance organizations and in particular the assassination of Psaros, which had just become known in the Middle East, caused a corresponding anti-EAM position from other bourgeois politicians as well as from Georgios Kartalis, representative of EKKA.

The purpose, the spirit and the character of the meeting of the Lebanon Conference are characteristically attributed in the opening speech delivered by G. Papandreou towards the delegates, the main points of which were:

The fact that we are meeting in this distant and hospitable country and that we are coming from different origins proves how crucial are the circumstances of our homeland. The Greek people groan today under the yoke of two inhuman tyrants, the Germans and the Bulgarians. And yet at no other time in its history has it had a more heroic national spirit and a greater desire for self-sacrifice. The barbaric conquerors harm the body but magnify the soul of our people. It is not the foreign invader but, unfortunately, the civil war, that fatally undermines our future. Because it hurts the soul of our people and offends the honor of the Nation. The cessation of the civil war and the unification of all our national forces against the barbarian invaders for the liberation of our homeland is the reason for our meeting.

And below referring to the terrifying events in the Greek countryside he emphasized:

The situation in our homeland today is hell. The Germans are slaughtering, the security battalions are slaughtering. The rebels are also slaughtering. Slaughtering and burning. What will remain of this unfortunate country? EAM's responsibility is that it did not only aim at the liberation struggle, but wanted to prepare its post-war dynamic dominance. For this reason it sought to monopolize the national struggle. It does not allow anyone else to go to the mountains and fight the conqueror, preventing the Greeks to fulfill their patriotic duty under the penalty of death. An old example is the present colonel Sarafis. And a recent one, the absent colonel Psarros.

Then, addressing the representatives of EAM and KKE, he bluntly posed the dilemma:

The time is historical and we ought to speak sincerely and openly. If EAM has the intention to use its current material power as a tool of civil war and extermination of its rivals, and tomorrow after the end of the war, under the alias of People's Republic, as an instrument of dynamic dominance over the Greek people, then of course there is no room for understanding. Our duty then is to mobilize the nation and invoke the assistance of all our great Allies in the dual struggle against both the external invader and against the internal enemy. Because the Greek people does not choose tyrants. It refuses tyranny. However, if EAM has made the decision to abandon the goals of dynamic dominance and to be content with the political means of persuasion for its future political dominance and if, as a result, it accepts to renounce all influence over our armed forces, if it accepts the abolition of ELAS, as well as the other guerilla forces and the formation of a national army, that will belong only to the homeland then the participation of EAM in our national union can be considered a fact.

== Delegates ==
The 25 delegates that were invited and took part in the Lebanon Conference, representing 15 parties and organizations, were:

- The President of the formed government Georgios Papandreou, as representative of the Democratic Socialist Party.
- Sofoklis Venizelos, Konstantinos Rentis, George Exintaris and Gerasimos Vassiliadis of the Liberal Party
- Dimitrios Londos for the People's Party
- Spyros Theotokis for the National People's Party (Εθνικού Λαϊκού Κόμμα)
- Georgios Sakalis for the Progressive Party
- Alexandros Mylonas for the Agrarian Democratic Party
- Ioannis Sofianopoulos for the Union of the Left (Ένωση Αριστερών)
- Panagiotis Kanellopoulos for the National Unionist Party
- Filippos Dragoumis as independent
- Alexandros Svolos as President of the Political Committee of National Liberation (PEEA), with Angelos Angelopoulos and Nikolaos Askoutsis, members of PEEA
- Petros Roussos, Communist Party of Greece (KKE)
- Miltiadis Porfyrogenis as general secretary of National Liberation Front (EAM), accompanied by EAM's member Dimitrios Stratis
- Major General Stefanos Sarafis, leader of ELAS, armed wing of EAM
- Komninos Pyromaglou, deputy leader of EDES, pro-Republican resistance organization, with Lieutenant-colonel S. Metaxas and Captain I. Metaxas, members of EDES
- Georgios Kartalis, EKKA, pro-Republican resistance organization
- Konstantinos Ventiris, general in the army of the Greek government in exile, with Antonis Stathatos

The conference proceedings were continuously monitored by the British ambassador Reginald Lipper who together with his staff recorded all the positions, views, objections, etc. of the delegates.

=== The final agreement ===
The agreement that was reached by all the delegates that took part in the Lebanon Conference was named National Contract. This consisted of the following eight chapters:

1. Condemnation of the insurgent movement, punishment of the instigators, reorganization of the Greek armed Forces in the Middle East and obeyance under the flag of the Greek nation.
2. The unification and obeyance under the orders of the national unity government and the Allied Headquarters of all the guerilla groups of free Greece, as well as the mobilization, when the time is right, of all the fighting forces of the nation against the occupiers.
3. The abolition of EAM's terrorism in the Greek countryside and the consolidation of personal security and political freedom of the people, when and where the occupier withdraws.
4. The continuous care for the adequate shipment of food and medicine to the enslaved Greece, as well as the mountainous region.
5. The assurance during the forthcoming, and together with the Allied forces, liberation of the homeland, of order and freedom to the Greek people in a manner that, free from both material and psychological violence, will decide sovereignly for the constitution, the social status and the government of its choice.
6. The imposition of harsh sanctions against traitors of the homeland and against the exploiters of the misery of the Greek people.
7. Provision for the immediate satisfaction, after liberation, of the material needs of the Greek people.
8. The complete satisfaction of our national rights. Our great service and great sacrifice, the holocaust of our homeland, cannot have any other justification than the creation of a new, free and great Greece.

=== Reactions ===
As mentioned above, the Conference proceedings took place "behind closed doors" with the outside world, however the opening speech of G. Papandreou was transmitted on a radio show (from Cairo Radio Station) and caused surprise and anger at Korischades where the leaders of the National Council had gathered. A storm of meetings followed, and on May 19 (one day before the Contract was signed) a decision was made and the following denunciation was sent to the Conference:

The National Council which consists of 175 representatives of the Greek people, having listened on the radio show the speech of Mr. Papandreou at the Middle East meeting
Decides
...........................
Expresses its surprise, because Mr. Papandreou spoke disrespectfully using slanderous inaccuracies for the great fighting organization of EAM and the heroic national ELAS army that for three years have been waging a relentless fight against the occupier and the traitors.
...........................
It denounces Mr. Papandreou to the Greek people and the peoples of the allies, as a disrupter of the national struggle and an enemy of the people's liberties.

The above telegram, even though it constituted a warning decision of the Council towards the EAM delegation, it appears, according to S. Grigoriadis, to have been withheld by the British and never been delivered to the hands of the delegation, but neither did the other delegates take knowledge of it during proceedings. This fact is also corroborated by Sarafis who confesses in his book "ELAS" that the delegation waited in vain, then, in Cairo some kind of message from Greece for authorization of its members to be sworn as ministers.

A consequence of all this was to then break out the so called political crisis of Cairo (1944).

== Notes ==
a: The above excerpts reveal the confidence of G. Papandreou in the developments of the war, to the extent that it raises suspicions that he knew about the long meeting that the British Foreign Minister Eden had with the Russian ambassador Yusef in London, on May 5, that is 17 days before the Lebanon Conference begun, as well as what was said, even though it was never published. Furthermore, in his speech he attacks EAM and PEEA as if they originated exclusively from communists, even though Angelos Angelopoulos who like Sarafis that were present, were not communists.

Referring to the security battalions (according to the left's point of view) he justified their actions, since EAM's victims turned to them asking for protection. Finally, when he mentioned the mutiny of Alexandria, which was a dark affair, EAM's representatives seemed to adopt that it was a projection rather than their creation, thus their stand on it was not only accommodating, but also its renouncement. So, in the end, everybody agreed with the punishment of the instigators, which was what Georgios II, Em. Tsouderos, G. Papandreou and the allies were asking. The delegates of EAM and KKE at least asked that the "ignorant" not be shot.

The mutiny of Alexandria had caused a problem to the allied operations in the Middle East, as well as the allies' anger. In particular, Churchill stated that "the glow of Greece among the nations had been tarnished", while Roosevelt stated more harshly that "Greece exited the allied camp", creating a fear within the Greek Government even for the possibility of non-concession of the Dodecanese, following the end of the war (it has to be noted that after the Alexandria mutiny the allied/British help towards EAM was discontinued).

For this reason, dramatic conversations and objections followed for four days. Especially judgmental towards EAM were the speeches of S.Venizelos and P. Kanellopoulos. The second day of proceedings, it is said that P. Rousos' oration was astonishing in his attempt to repel Papandreou, however his speech fell on deaf ears, since he could not confront the murder of D. Psarros for which G. Kartalis did not stop for a second, in intense emotional state, for two continuous hours, to blame and reveal the true intentions of EAM - ELAS. In particular, he revealed, that during a meeting he had with Siantos at the northern Fairy airport, in August 1943, when he denied the 5/42 Evzone Regiment's entry to ELAS, he replied "Anyone who refuses to work with KKE will be considered Gestapo". At one point of his speech G. Kartalis referring to Sarafis said: "You were declared commander-in-chief of ELAS by spit" (meaning the humiliating circumstances of his accession). Then, when Sarafis took the floor, in his attempt to shake off the accusations, attacked the delegates of the other organizations, concluding "We built our strength by fighting and creating a Free Greece". All other delegates took the floor, thus various terrible things were heard against ELAS, like that EDES was its first enemy instead of the Germans. Taking the floor I. Sofianopoulos, argued for the need to form a national army and the reconciliation of all the Greek political world for ensuring a smooth political life and democratic evolution. In the end, in an enthusiastic climate, the programmatic principles were unanimously accepted.

The night of May 20, the text that emerged as joint statement of the 25 delegates, which was signed by all, referred to by G. Papandreou as "National Contract", was based on his initial programmatic declarations.

b: The above "contract" foresaw the formation of a unified government, however without determining the number and which particular Ministries would EAM receive, leaving this subject to be solved in the immediate future during conversations that were to take place in Cairo. However, the following points are worth noting:

a) There was no mention anywhere of the until then "National Resistance".

b) The terrorism of the countryside was condemned with clear insinuation that it was due to EAM.

c) The Security Battalions were not denounced, on the contrary it was reported that the victims of EAM turned to them for protection.

d) The mutiny of Middle East was stigmatized being described as a national crime.

e) Al. Svolos would not take over as vice president.

f) The ministries of Interior and Military were taken out of the negotiation.

g) Finally, instead of the 50% of the ministries, it was determined to grant 25% to the EAM delegation.

All seven points above, in correlation with the preliminary "minimum claims" suggest not only a simple retreat from EAM, but a complete retraction in essential positions. Hence S. Grigoriadis described the Conference as the greatest defeat suffered by the EAM, while V. Rafailidis "the Waterloo of EAM, KKE and all left political forces". Of course when these started to become known in the Greek mountains, the anger that broke out was to be expected, resulting in a crisis.

c: The above 2nd note (recorded in Churchill's file under number 3-211-16) is not mentioned in A. Eden's "Memoirs". The question of if it was sent or not does not overturn Churchill's perceptions and intentios at the time. From its date and the references therein, it is very clear that the invitation of the "mountain men" to the Lebanon Conference from S. Venizelos, as well as their confident declaration of their acceptance of this, had already preceded May 5, 1944.

== See also ==
- Political crisis of Cairo (1944)
- Caserta Agreement
- Treaty of Varkiza

== Citations ==
1. ↑ IEE, vol. 14, p. 83, Athens Publishing house, 2000 ISBN 978-960-213-095-7
2. ↑ G. Andrikopoulos "1944 Critical year" Athens 1974, vol. A, p. 168
3. ↑ Solon Grigoriadis "December 1944 - The inexplicable mistake" (from the series Awesome Documents), Typos publications, p. 99
4. ↑ Stefanos Sarafis "ELAS" p. 349
5. ↑ Spyridon Gasparinatos, The Occupation, vol. 2, p. 548
6. ↑ "December 1944 - The inexplicable mistake" (from the series Awesome Documents), Typos publications, p. 101
7. ↑ "History (tragicomedy) of the Modern Greek State 1830 - 1974", p. 175

== Sources ==
- Efst. Georgopoulos "Civil War 1942-1944" Periscope publishing "Monographs of Military History" Athens 2010, p.78 et seq.
- V. Rafailidis "History (tragicomedy) of the Modern Greek State 1830 - 1974", Athens 1993, p. 175 et seq
- "Great Greek Encyclopedia" vol. 10, p. 327
