= National Solidarity =

National Solidarity may refer to:

- National Solidarity (Greece), World War II-era Resistance welfare service in Greece
- National Solidarity Alliance, a Peruvian political alliance
- National Solidarity Party (Guatemala), a political party in Guatemala
- National Solidarity (Peru), a Peruvian political party
- Union for Democracy and National Solidarity, an oppositional political party in Benin, part of the Star Alliance
