= 1938 Greek coup attempt =

The Coup d'état attempt of 1938 or coup d'état of Chania was a short-lived coup attempt in Chania, Greece, aimed at overthrowing the dictatorship of Ioannis Metaxas in 1938. Due to poor organization, the coup collapsed within a few hours and never seriously threatened the dictatorial regime.

== Events ==
Many Cretans, especially politicians from the Venizelist camp, were involved in the 1938 coup d'état which aimed to overthrow the dictatorship of Ioannis Metaxas. The uprising of 1938 was the only armed insurrection against the dictatorship of Metaxas and broke out on 28 July 1938 in Chania. Aristomenis Mitsotakis was the leader of the coup. The uprising was hoped to trigger a broader revolt and revolution that would be organized in Athens. Among the people that helped to organize this plan were the governor of the Bank of Greece at the time, Emmanouil Tsouderos, Ioannis Mountakis, M. Voloudakis, and Emmanouil Mantakas. The banned Communist Party of Greece (KKE) was also involved.

On 28 July 1938, the radio station of Chania emitted a proclamation asking King George II of Greece to end Metaxas’ dictatorship in order for the Greeks to be free. Because of the limited timeframe and the low number of people initiated in the plans, but also due to the very poor planning, the coup was doomed to fail, and collapsed within a few hours. The government reacted fast and effectively, sending powerful military forces to Crete and seaplanes to Milos. After some minor clashes, Chania was clear of rebels.

About a month later, on 22 August 1938, martial law was declared across the county and a Provisional Military Court was established in the city of Chania. Its chairman was Lieutenant General Konstantinos Michalopoulos, later leader of the Greek Gendarmerie, and its royal prosecutor was Lieutenant Colonel Solon Gikas, later Chief of the Hellenic Army General Staff and Minister. It seems however that, with the “tolerance” of Ioannis Metaxas, A. Mitsotakis, M. Voloudakis, I. Mountakis, and others from the Venizelist camp fled to Cyprus, while others who participated in the coup, such as Konstantinos Rentis, Emmanouil Tsouderos et al. were arrested, convicted and deported. The next year though they were amnestied. General Emmanouil Mantakas was arrested after the failure of the coup and later freed by a group of armed fellow villagers, but was sentenced to life imprisonment. No death sentences were executed.

== Assessment and aftermath ==
The failure of the coup was because, while there had been preparations for a nationwide uprising, it broke out only in Chania and it was isolated from any other anti-dictatorship movements. According to records of the Gendarmerie, shortly before the outbreak of the coup, Markos Vafiadis had arrived in Crete for the organization of the local Communist Party. After the uprising, at the end of the same year, another coup began to be organized but was never materialized and remained known in history as the "conspiracy of the Germanophiles". Leader of the coup was Periklis Kavdas, a retired officer and cabinet minister of Ioannis Metaxas. Among the leaders of the 1938 uprising, Mantakas would later go on to serve in the Communist-dominated "Mountain Government" during the Axis occupation of Greece.
