= All People Front =

All People Front Παλλαϊκό Μέτωπο
- Leader: Nikos Zachariadis
- Founded: 1935
- Dissolved: 1936
- Ideology: Communism; Marxism–Leninism
- Political position: Far-left

The All People Front (Greek: Παλλαϊκό Μέτωπο, ΠΑΜΕ; PAME) was an electoral coalition formed between the Communist Party of Greece, the Common Front of Workers, Farmers and Professionals and the United Front of Workers and Peasants. It participated in the elections of 1935 as Communists and Allies and took 9,59% without electing any MPs.

Before the elections of 1936, the Agricultural Party of Greece and several independent left-wing personalities entered the coalition in order to contest the 1936 Greek legislative election. The All People Front took 5.76% of the vote and won 15 seats.

== Election results ==
=== Hellenic Parliament ===
Election	Hellenic Parliament					Rank	Government	Leader
Election	Votes	%	±pp	Seats won	+/−	Rank	Government	Leader
1935	98,699	9.6%	▲5.0	0 / 300	±0	#3	No seats	Collective leadership
1936	73,411	5.8%	▼3.8	15 / 300	▲15	#4	Opposition	Collective leadership

^{A} 1935 results compared to the KKE totals in the 1933 election.
