= General Popular Radical Union =

General Popular Radical Union Γενική Λαϊκή Ριζοσπαστική Ένωσις
- Leader: Georgios Kondylis
- Founded: 1932
- Dissolved: 1936
- Ideology: Monarchism; Anti-Venizelism; National conservatism
- Political position: Right-wing

The General Popular Radical Union (Greek: Γενική Λαϊκή Ριζοσπαστική Ένωσις) was a coalition of three Greek political parties for the elections of 1936.

Members to the coalition were:

- National Radical Party
- National People's Party
- Party of Independent Populars
