= Theodoros Koukoulakis =

Greek revolutionary

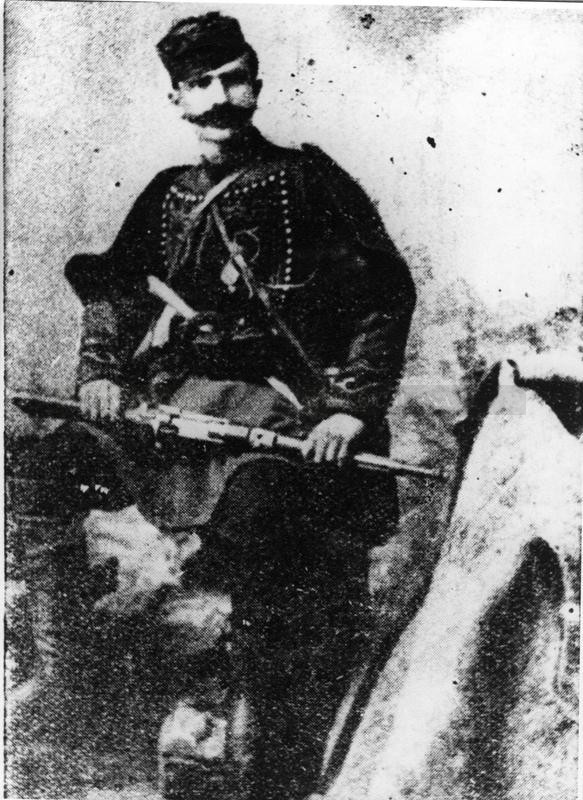
- Theodoros Koukoulakis during the Macedonian Struggle
- Native name: Θεόδωρος Κουκουλάκης
- Born: c. 1879; Lakkoi, Eyalet of Crete, Ottoman Empire (now Greece)
- Died: 14 September 1909 Athens, Kingdom of Greece
- Allegiance: Kingdom of Greece
- Branch: Hellenic Army
- Conflicts: Greco-Turkish War (1897); Cretan Revolt; Macedonian Struggle; Battle of Zagoritsanis

Theodoros Koukoulakis (Greek: Θεόδωρος Κουκουλάκης, c. 1879 – 1909 ) was a Greek revolutionary and a minor leader of the Macedonian Struggle.

== Biography ==
Koukoulakis was a member of a well-known Cretan family from Lakkoi, a village near Chania. Many members of his family took part in various revolutions of the 19th century as Greek War of Independence, Cretan revolt of 1866 etc. and others were officers of the Hellenic Army. Koukoulakis himself, was a volunteer during the Cretan Revolt of 1897.

In November 1904 he entered Macedonia as a member of his fellow Cretan officer Georgios Tsontos. Later, he became leader of a small band in Kastanochoria (el). His main activity is located in 1904/05 period. During early 1905, Koukoulakis and his men were between Drosopigi and Lechovo. The same period, according to Greek sources, his band made a successful ambush against komitadjis and after that Koukoulakis and his men avoid an operation that was held by the Ottoman Gendarmerie. In March 1905, Koukoulakis took part in the attack against the Bulgarian village of Zagoritsani ( today, Vasiliada). During the attack, he entered the village from the north side along with his fellow Cretan leader, Ioannis Poulakas.

Koukoulakis died on 14 September 1909 in Athens due to health problems that he suffered from his time in Macedonia.
