= Independent Socialist Party (Greece) =

The Independent Socialist Party (Greek: Ανεξάρτητο Σοσιαλιστικό Κόμμα) was a political party in Greece. The party was formed in 1931, through a split in the Socialist Party of Greece. The party was led by the trade union leader Dimitris Stratis. In 1932, the Independent Socialist Party was dissolved and Stratis returned to the Socialist Party.
