= Alexandros Svolos =

Greek legal expert and politician (1892–1956)

- Aλέξανδρος Σβώλος

Chairman of the Political Committee of National Liberation
- In office 18 April 1944 – 9 October 1944
- Preceded by: Evripidis Bakirtzis
- Succeeded by: Georgios Papandreou (as president of the government of national unity)

Personal details
- Born: 1892 Kruševo, Manastir Vilayet, Ottoman Empire
- Died: 22 February 1956 (aged 63–64) Athens, Greece
- Party: Socialist Party of Greece, Union of People's Democracy
- Spouse: Maria Svolou
- Education: National and Kapodistrian University of Athens
- Profession: Professor of law; Politician

Alexandros Svolos (Greek: Αλέξανδρος Σβώλος; 1892 – 22 February 1956) was a prominent Greek legal expert, who also served as president of the Political Committee of National Liberation, a Resistance-based government during the Axis occupation of Greece.

== Early life ==
Svolos was born in 1892 in Kruševo, now in North Macedonia, then part of the Ottoman Empire. He was an Aromanian. He studied law at Constantinople in 1911-1912, and from there went on to study at the University of Athens under Nikolaos Saripolos. In 1915 he was appointed to teach at the university.

Between 1917 and 1920, he was the head of the Labour and Social Policy Direction at the Ministry of National Economy, and helped to push through legislation ratifying the newly founded International Labour Organization's conventions. Subsequently, he was employed as head administrator at Bursa in Asia Minor, then occupied by the Greek Army, until 1922. He married feminist Maria Svolou in 1923.

In 1929 he succeeded his mentor, N. Saripolos, at the seat of Constitutional Law at Athens, a position he retained until 1946. Because of his left-leaning political views, he was dismissed in 1935 and again during the Metaxas Regime in 1936, when he was sent to internal exile in various Aegean Islands.

== Political activity during and after WWII ==
After the German invasion in April 1941, Greece was occupied by the Axis, and divided into German, Italian and Bulgarian zones. Svolos, at the head of a Committee of Macedonians and Thracians, sent repeated protests to the German authorities protesting the Bulgarians' open annexation of Greek territory and their maltreatment of the local Greek population.

In the meantime, the Resistance movement had been growing, and by early 1944, a large part of the Greek mainland was free, under the control of the Resistance. In March, the leftist EAM/ELAS movement set up a government of its own, the Political Committee of National Liberation (PEEA), rivaling both the collaborationist one in Athens and the King's government in exile in Cairo. In April 1944, Svolos agreed to become its president, while Evripidis Bakirtzis, his predecessor, became its vice-president.

In this role, Svolos participated in the Lebanon conference in May 1944, when the establishment of a government of national unity under Georgios Papandreou was decided. However, the PEEA continued to exercise its authority in Greece until liberation, in October 1944, with Svolos as its head. In the Papandreou government he held the portfolio of the Finance Ministry, where his measures to restore the Greek economy made him unpopular. He finally resigned from the Papandreou government along with the other EAMist ministers on December 2, in the lead-up to the Dekemvriana. After EAM's defeat in the Dekemvriana, he was again dismissed from his teaching post at the university.

Svolos then became president of the small Socialist ELD party until 1953, when it was merged with the Democratic Party, forming the Democratic Party of the Working People, which he also headed together with Georgios Kartalis until his death in 1956. He was elected to Parliament for Thessaloniki in 1950 and 1956, but died three days after the latter.

== Academic career ==
Alexandros Svolos was among the most prominent experts on constitutional law in Greece, and held strong democratic and socialist views, which put him often at odds with the Greek establishment of the time.

His very first academic treatise was his doctoral thesis in 1915, where he examined the constitutional right of workers to form unions. His expertise in labour matters was recognized by his appointment to the Labour Directorate in the Ministry of National Economy. In 1928, he published a study on the liberal Greek Constitution of 1927, called "The New Constitution and the foundations of the Government", applying special emphasis on its social role. In 1929, in his speech on his acceptance of the teaching chair at the university, he emphasized the necessity of protection of minorities from the powerful executive authority. This speech was given at a time when even formerly liberal politicians, like Eleftherios Venizelos, were increasingly adopting measures to control the people, and especially to curb the growing influence of the Communist Party of Greece. Svolos' last academic work was a study, done together with George Vlachos, of the Greek Constitution of 1952, and was published in two volumes in 1954-1955.

In his honour, a hall has been named after him in the Law School of the University of Athens.

Preceded by Evripidis Bakirtzis	Chairman of the PEEA; April 18 - October 9, 1944	Succeeded by Georgios Papandreou as head of government of national unity
