= Greek Socialist League =

The Greek Socialist League (Greek: Σοσιαλιστικός Σύνδεσμος, ΣΣ; SS) was a socialist organization in Greece. The Socialist Party of Greece had merged with the Democratic Party, forming the Democratic Party of Working People, in September 1953. The Socialist League was founded on December 6, 1953, as a platform for socialist politics inside the new party. It did not consider itself a political party as such, but rather an organized faction. It published the journal Sosialistika Fylla ("Socialist Papers").

The Socialist League observed the Socialist International at its 1955 congress in London.

As of 1957, the Executive Committee of the Socialist League consisted of Dimitris Stratis (Chairman), Stratis Someritis (Vice-Chairman), Agnes Roussopoulos (General Secretary), Takis Kyrkos (Joint Secretary), D. Goutas, I. Sakellariou, I. Papatheodorou, E. Paraskevas, E. Anastassiadis, Katerina Athanassiadou, I. Laoutaris, T. Tzaveas, M. Anagnostaras, S. Issaris and G. Katsoulis.

The Socialist League was dissolved in 1964.

== Bibliography ==
- Braunthal, Julius, ed. (1957). Yearbook of the International Socialist Labour Movement. Vol. I. London: Lincolns-Prager International Yearbook Publishing Company.
