= Old Democratic Union of Crete =

Defunct political party in Greece

The Old Democratic Union of Crete (Greek: Παλαιοδημοκρατική Ένωση Κρήτης) was a political party in Greece in the 1930s.

== History ==
The party first contested national elections in January 1936, winning three seats in the Hellenic Parliament with 1.1% of the vote.

The 1936 elections were the last before World War II as a dictatorial regime took power in August, and the party did not return to contest elections following the war.
