= Agricultural Democratic Party =

The Agricultural Democratic Party (Greek: Αγροτικό Δημοκρατικό Κόμμα) was a political party in Greece in the 1930s.

== History ==
The party first contested national elections in January 1936, winning a single seat in the Hellenic Parliament with 1% of the vote.

The 1936 elections were the last before World War II as a dictatorial regime took power in August, and the party did not return to contest national elections following the war.
