= Lakkoi =

Lakkoi Λάκκοι
- Community
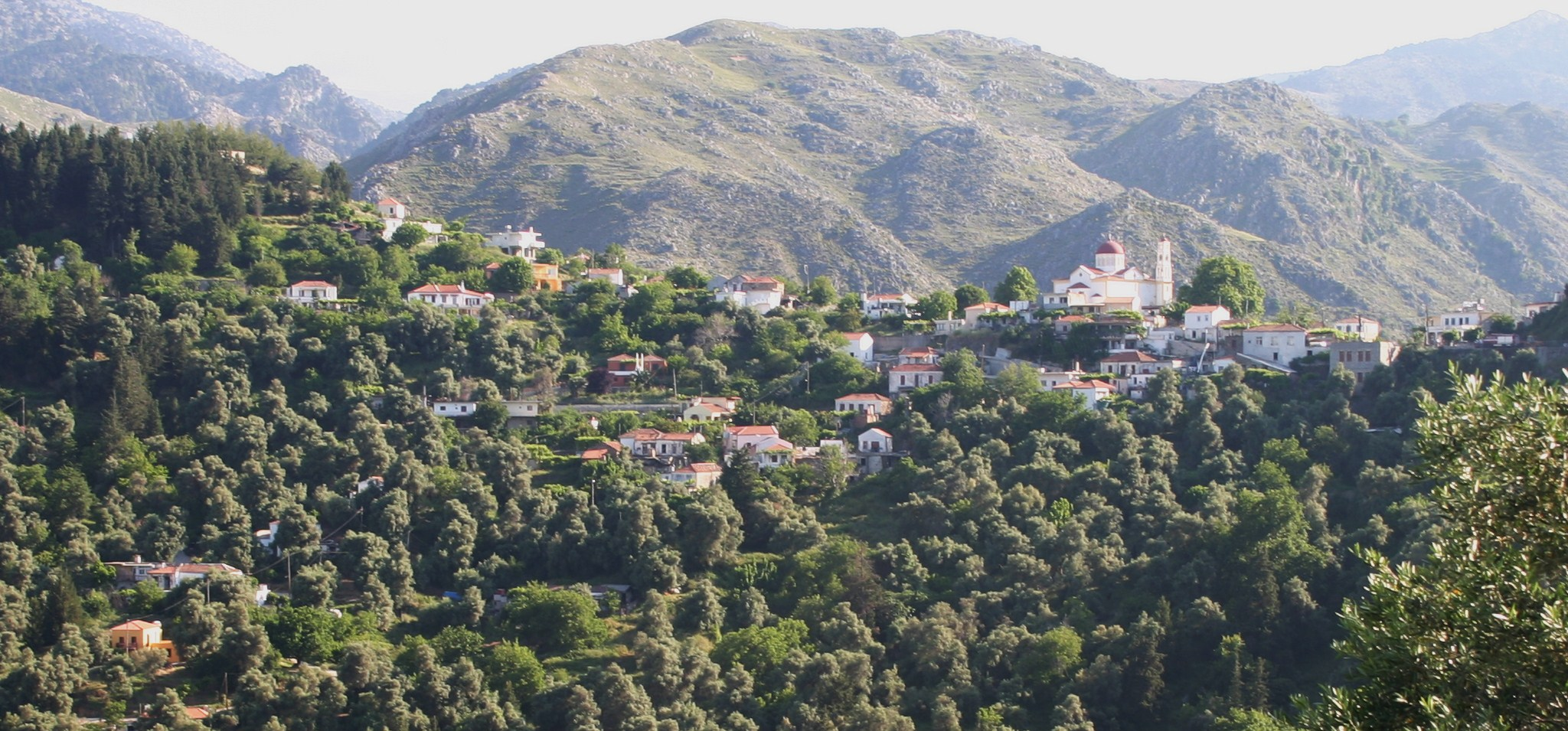

- Location within Greece
- Coordinates: 35°23.8′N 23°56.5′E
- Country: Greece
- Administrative region: Crete
- Regional unit: Chania
- Municipality: Platanias
- Municipal unit: Mousouroi
- Elevation: 450 m (1,480 ft)

Population (2021)
  - Community: 219
- Time zone: UTC+2 (EET)
  - Summer (DST): UTC+3 (EEST)
- Website: www.lakkoi.gr

Lakkoi (Greek: Λάκκοι), commonly spelled Lakki on road signs and maps, is a village on the Greek island of Crete in the foothills of the Lefka Ori (White Mountains). The village is situated on the road between Chania and the plateau of Omalos which leads to the Samaria Gorge.

== Geography ==
Lakkoi is 450 metres high, below the White Mountains which rise another 1,000 metres to the south. Most of the houses cling to steep slopes covered in olive and chestnut trees, reached through narrow roads or tracks that run down from the main square.

The climate is cool in winter, with occasional snow, wet in spring, hot and dry in the summer. In the unusually dry summer of 2007, major brush fires broke out twice, burning about 2,000 acres (8.1 km^{2}) and threatening the village itself.

== Economy ==
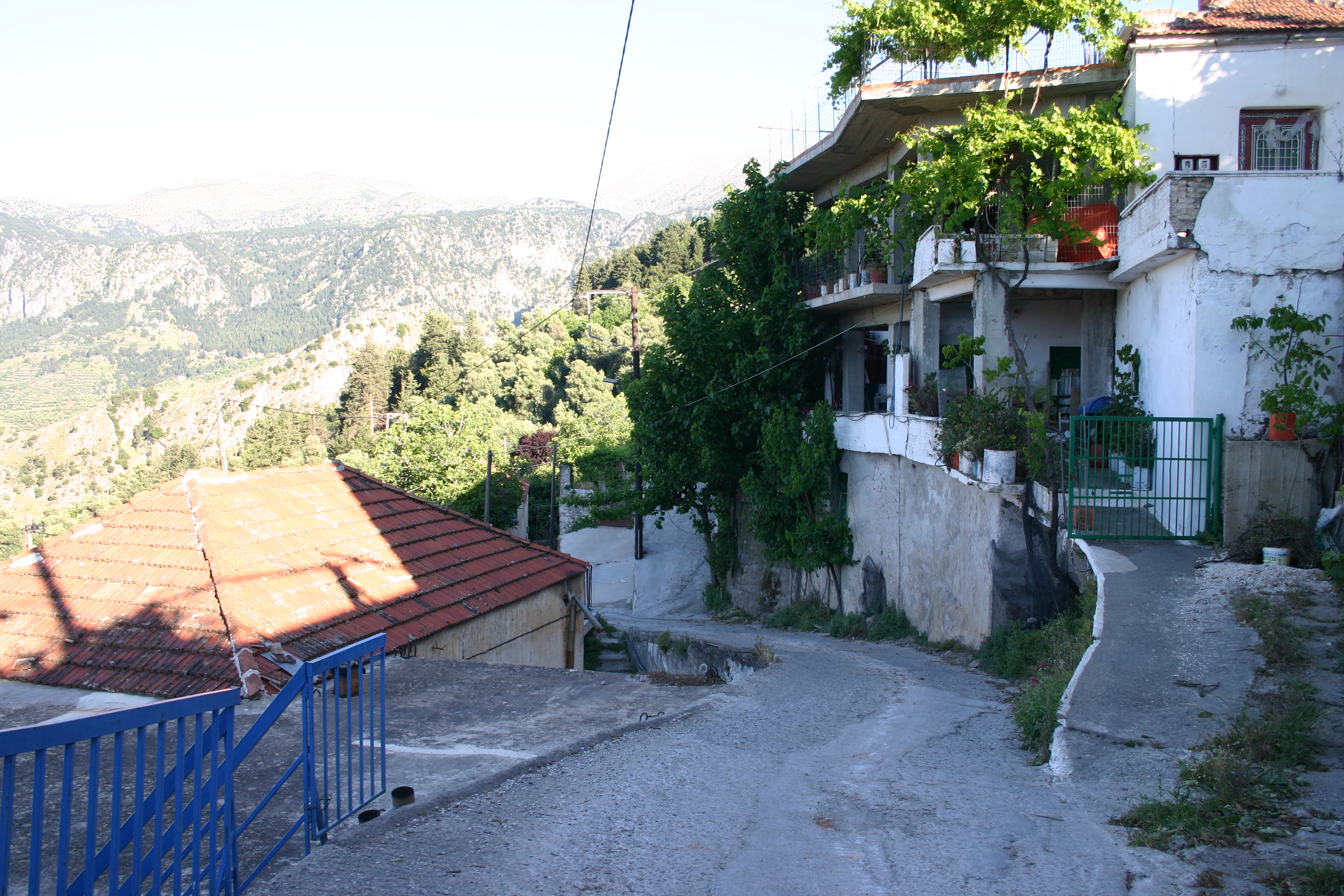
Street in Lakkoi

Traditionally the villagers have cultivated olives and raised goats, sheep and chickens. With limited work opportunities, the population has declined from a peak of around 2,000 to 219 (2021 census). There are signs of growth as houses are being purchased and renovated by citizens of other European Union countries seeking low-cost retirement or vacation homes.

== History ==
The first historical mention of the village dates from 1263, when the Lakkoi chieftain Pentachtenis took part in a revolt against the Venetians. In a later revolt in 1570 the chieftain George Mousouris became Secretary General of the rebel forces, based in the nearby village of Meskla.

After the Ottoman conquest of the island, the people of Lakkoi were involved in periodic revolts, notably the revolt of 1821-1828 during the Greek War of Independence, where an Ottoman army of 5,000 men led by Latif Pasha of Chania was routed in a pitched battle at Lakki. In the great rebellion of 1866-1869 Katerina Stamataki of Lakkoi was a distinguished woman revolutionary. During the Battle of Crete in May 1941 and the days that followed, four hundred and eighty five men and women resisted the German occupiers, and sixty eight Lakkoiotes lost their lives in the fight for the freedom of Greece.

== Notable people ==
- Theodoros Koukoulakis
- Manolis Mantakas
