= Democratic Coalition (Greece) =

Democratic Coalition Δημοκρατικός Συνασπισμός
- Leader: Georgios Kafantaris
- Founded: 1936
- Ideology: Liberalism; Social Liberalism; Democratic socialism Agrarianism
- Political position: Centre-left

The Democratic Coalition (Greek: Δημοκρατικός Συνασπισμός) was a coalition of three Greek political parties for the elections of 1936.

Members to the coalition were:

- Progressive Party
- Democratic Socialist Party of Greece
- Agricultural and Labour Party
