= Political Committee of National Liberation =

Communist government during the Axis occupation of Greece in World War II

Political Committee of National Liberation Πολιτική Επιτροπή Εθνικής Απελευθέρωσης
- 1944
- Flag Coat of arms
- Anthem: "Imnos is tin Eleftherian"; Ὕμνος εἰς τὴν Ἐλευθερίαν "Hymn to Freedom" "Hymn of Political Committee of National Liberation" (Ýmnos tis PEEA)
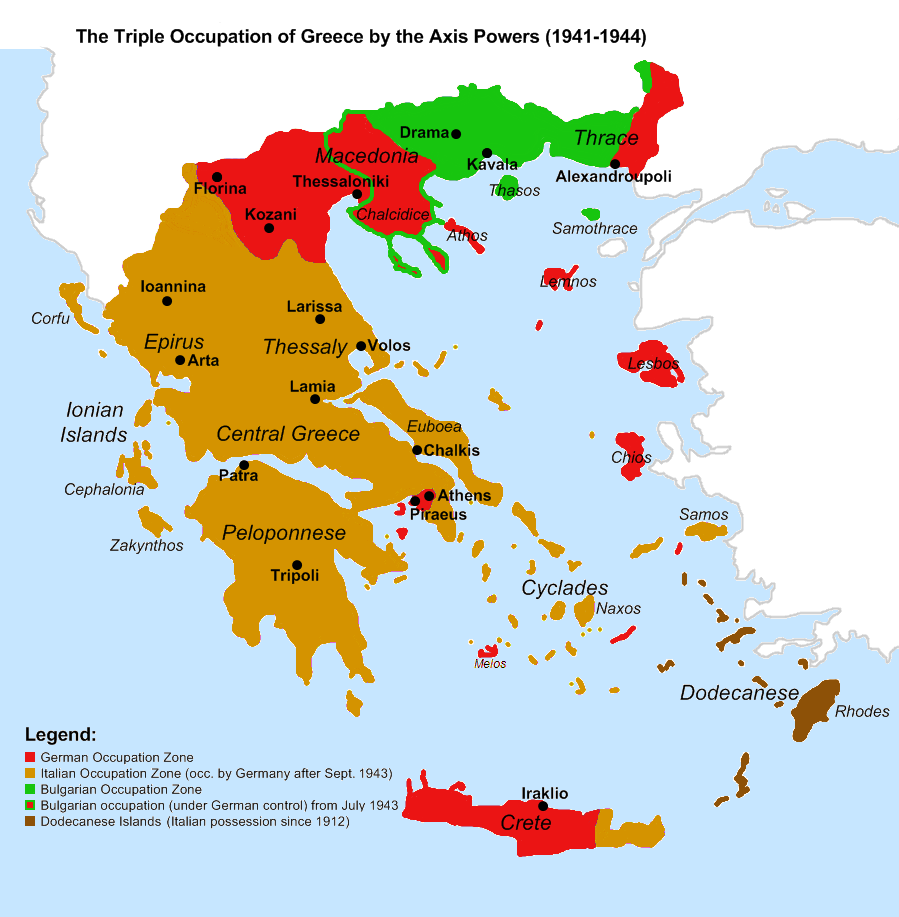
- Capital: Athens (official), Viniani (headquarters)
- Common languages: Greek (Demotic Greek)
- Demonyms: Greek, Hellene
- Government: Provisional Marxist–Leninist socialist republic
- Chairman of PEEA
  - 10 March 1944 – 18 April 1944: Evripidis Bakirtzis
  - 18 April 1944 – 2 September 1944: Alexandros Svolos
- Deputy Chairman of PEEA
  - 18 April 1944 – 2 September 1944: Evripidis Bakirtzis
- Legislature: National Council
- Historical era: World War II
  - Established: 10 March 1944
  - Disestablished: 5 November
- Currency: Greek drachma (₯)
Preceded by	Succeeded by
Hellenic State (1941–1944)	Provisional Democratic Government

The Political Committee of National Liberation (Greek: Πολιτική Επιτροπή Εθνικής Απελευθέρωσης, Politiki Epitropi Ethnikis Apeleftherosis, PEEA), commonly known as the "Mountain Government" (Greek: Κυβέρνηση του Βουνού, Kivernisi tou Vounou), was a Communist Party-dominated government established in Greece in 1944 in opposition to both the collaborationist German-controlled government in Athens and to the royal government-in-exile in Cairo.

It was integrated with the Greek government-in-exile in a national unity government at the Lebanon conference in May 1944.

== Establishment ==
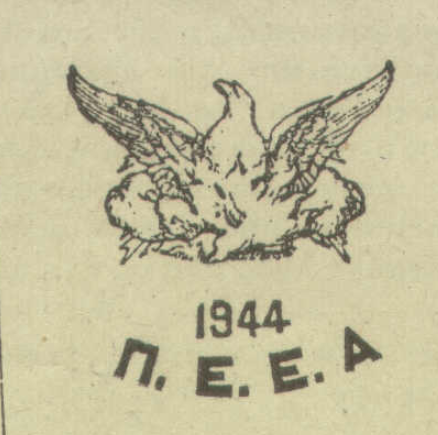
Emblem of the Political Committee of National Liberation (appearing in the newspaper of National Liberation Front

The PEEA was established on 10 March 1944 in the village of Viniani in Evrytania by the leftist National Liberation Front (EAM) - Greek People's Liberation Army (ELAS) movement, which was then in control of much of the country. Its aims, according to its founding charter, were, "to intensify the struggle against the conquerors ... for full national liberation, for the consolidation of the independence and integrity of our country (...) and for the annihilation of domestic fascism and armed traitor formations".

The PEEA's authority was significantly reinforced after the establishment of the National Council (Greek: Εθνικό Συμβούλιο) in 1944. The National Council was an assembly elected by secret elections organised by the PEEA in late April 1944 in both the liberated parts of Greece and the still-occupied cities, mainly Athens. Between 1.5 and 1.8 million Greeks voted in these elections, which are notable for the fact that for the first time in Greece, women were allowed to vote. The Council first converged in Koryschades, a mountain village of Evrytania, from 14 to 27 May 1944. Its main act was voting a resolution, an extract of which is quoted:

"General clauses

The National Council, composed of representatives of the whole of the Greek people, who converged to declare its inexpugnable will to fight to the bitter end for the liberation of the country, the destruction of fascism and the restoration of its national unity and popular sovereignty, willing to determine the way all authorities are exercised in free Greece, votes:

- Article 1: It ratifies the charter establishing Political Committee of National Liberation of March 10, 1944.
- Article 2: All powers derive from the people and are exercised by the people. Self-administration and popular judicature are fundamental institutions of the public life of the Greeks.
- Article 3: The National Council is the supreme instrument of popular sovereignty. The PEEA possesses all powers determined in this decree.
- Article 4: The People's liberties are sacred and inviolable. The struggling nation will protect them from any threats no matter where they are coming from.
- Article 5: All Greeks, men and women, have equal political and civil rights.
- Article 6: Employment is a fundamental social function and generates rights for the enjoyment of life’s goods.
- Article 7: The People's language is the formal language for all manifestations of public life and for all educational grades."

The PEEA's first president was Evripidis Bakirtzis, the former leader of National and Social Liberation (EKKA). On April 18 Alexandros Svolos, a prominent professor of constitutional law of the University of Athens, took his position and Bakirtzis became vice-president. Not only communist leaders but also many progressive bourgeois, who had nothing to do with communist ideas, participated in the PEEA.

ELAS not only resisted German and Italian occupation forces but also re-organised life in Free Greece, the mountainous areas (i.e. the biggest part of Greece) it controlled. EAM, with the co-ordination and organization of the PEEA, helped the local people organise schools, hospitalise refugees from the big cities and protect the crops from German looting. Amateur actors and musicians created travelling theatres and bands, something that most rural communities had never seen or heard before. Another achievement of ELAS (due partially to the progressive ideas and partially to the lack of men) was to promote women's rights. Young girls, who until then were working at home or the fields, had the opportunity to educate and express themselves. There were also improvised telecommunications either by telephone lines or by messengers and systems of re-distribution of food-resources, so that no village would starve.

== Mountain Government ==
=== Interim government ===
Minister	Portfolio	Party	Dates
Evripidis Bakirtzis	President; Secretary of Foreign Affairs	Communist Party of Greece	10 March 1944 – 18 April 1944
Georgios Siantos	Secretary of the Interior	Communist Party of Greece	10 March 1944 – 18 April 1944
Ilias Tsirimokos	Secretary of Justice	Union of People's Democracy	10 March 1944 – 18 April 1944
Kostas Gavriilidis	Secretary of Agriculture	Agrarian Party of Greece	10 March 1944 – 18 April 1944

Incumbent	Office	Party	Dates
Alexandros Svolos	President of the Cabinet	Union of People's Democracy	18 April 1944 – 2 September 1944
Evripidis Bakirtzis	Deputy President of the Cabinet and Secretary of the Food	Communist Party of Greece	18 April 1944 – 2 September 1944
Ilias Tsirimokos	Secretary of Justice	Union of People's Democracy	18 April 1944 – 2 September 1944
Georgios Siantos	Secretary of the Interior	Communist Party of Greece	18 April 1944 – 2 September 1944
Manolis Mantakas	Secretary of Military Affairs	Independent	18 April 1944 – 2 September 1944
Nikolaos Askoutsis[el]	Secretary of Transport	Communist Party of Greece	18 April 1944 – 2 September 1944
Angelos Angelopoulos[el]	Secretary of Finance	Independent	18 April 1944 – 2 September 1944
Petros Kokkalis	Secretary of Social Welfare	Independent	18 April 1944 – 2 September 1944
Kostas Gavriilidis	Secretary of Agriculture	Agrarian Party of Greece	18 April 1944 – 2 September 1944
Stamatis Hatzibeis[el]	Secretary of National Economy	Independent	18 April 1944 – 2 September 1944

== Sources ==
- Clogg, Richard (2013). A Concise History of Modern Greece (3rd ed.). Cambridge University Press. ISBN 978-1-10761203-7.
- Papastratis, Procopis (2006). "Local Government in Liberated Areas of Occupied Greece". In Bruno De Wever; Herman Van Goethem; Nico Wouters (eds.). Local Government in Occupied Europe (1939–1945). Gent: Academia Press. pp. 205–220. ISBN 9038208928.
- Skalidakis, Yannis (2015). "From Resistance to Counterstate: The Making of Revolutionary Power in the Liberated Zones of Occupied Greece, 1943–1944". Journal of Modern Greek Studies. 33 (1): 155–184. doi:10.1353/mgs.2015.0000. S2CID 141718083.
