= 1936 Greek parliamentary election =

- 26 January 1936

All 300 seats in the Hellenic Parliament 151 seats needed for a majority
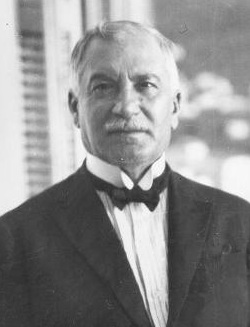

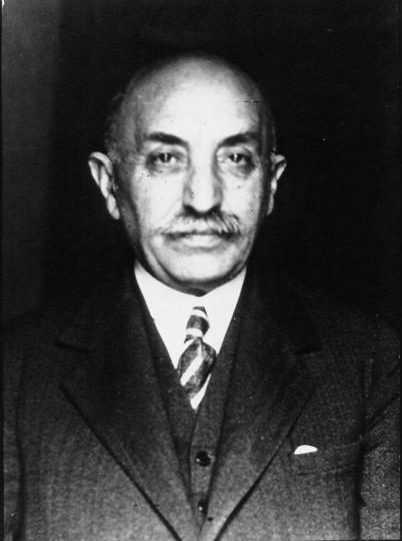

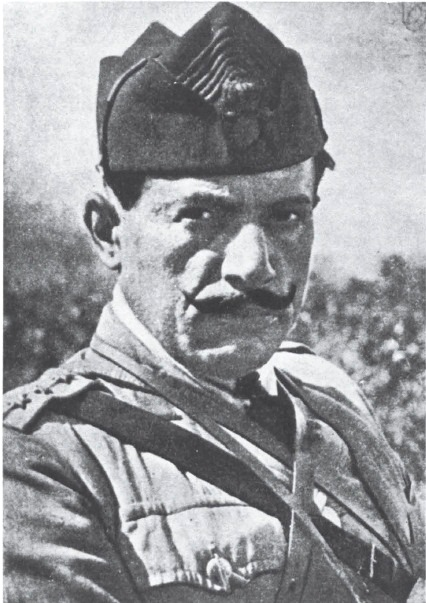

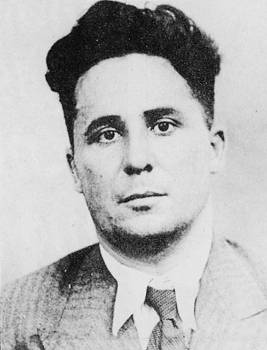

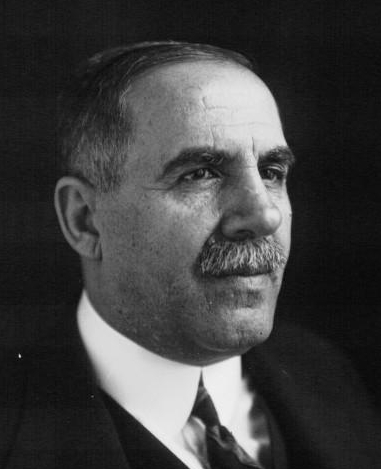

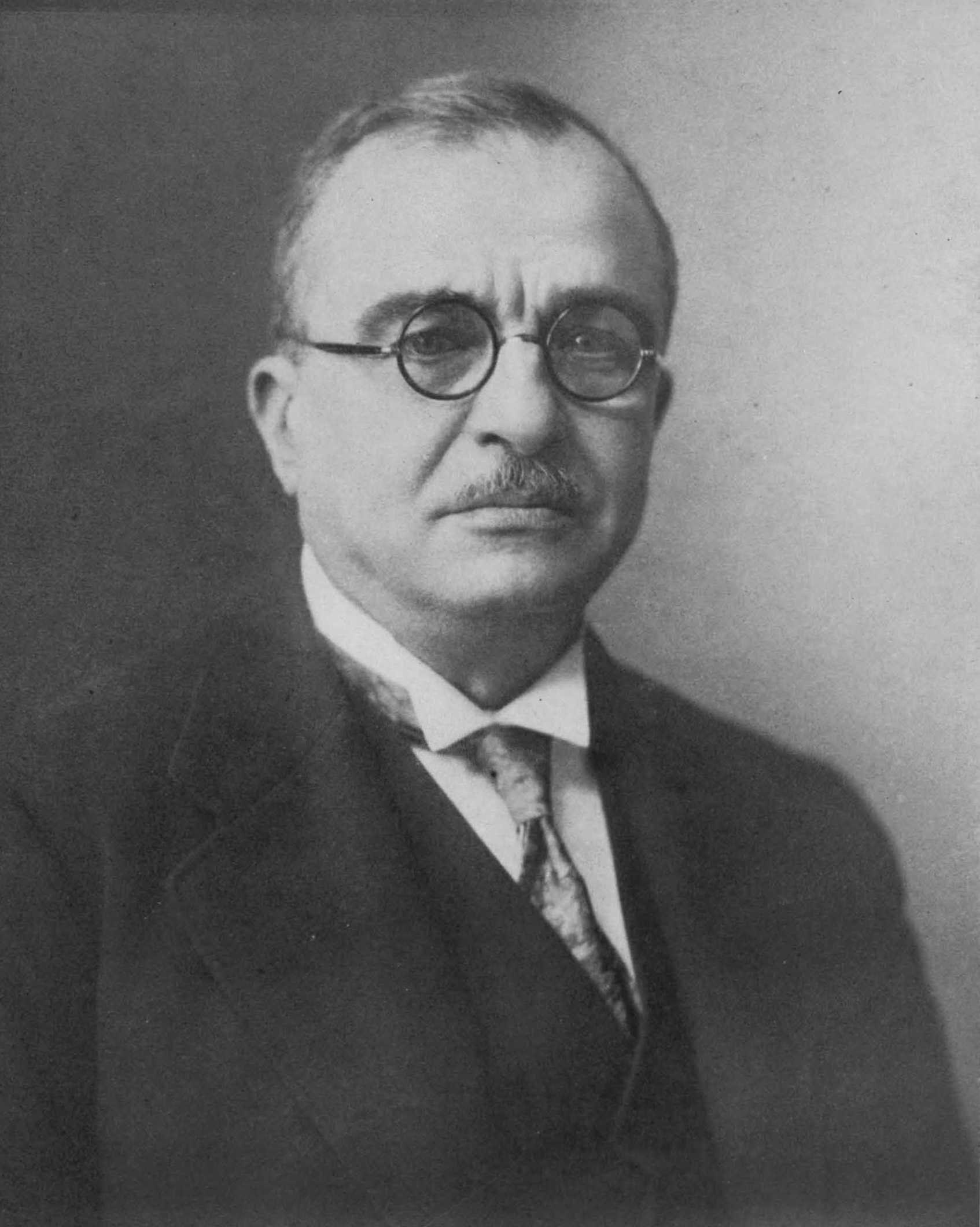
	First party	Second party	Third party
Leader	Themistoklis Sofoulis	Panagis Tsaldaris	Georgios Kondylis
Party	Liberal	People's Party	GLRE
Last election	Boycotted	255 seats	32 seats
Seats won	126	72	60
Seat change	New	▼183	▲28
Popular vote	474,651	281,597	253,384
Percentage	37.26%	22.10%	19.89%
	Fourth party	Fifth party	Sixth party
Leader	Nikos Zachariadis	Georgios Kafantaris	Ioannis Metaxas
Party	PM	DS	KE
Last election	0 seats	Boycotted	6 seats
Seats won	15	11	7
Seat change	▲15	New	▲1
Popular vote	73,411	53,693	50,137
Percentage	5.76%	4.21%	3.94%
Prime Minister before election
Konstantinos Demertzis
Independent
Prime Minister after election
Konstantinos Demertzis
Independent

Parliamentary elections were held in Greece on 26 January 1936. The Liberal Party emerged as the largest party in Parliament, winning 126 of the 300 seats.

== Results ==
Party	Votes	%	Seats	+/–
Liberal Party	474,651	37.26	126	New
People's Party	281,597	22.10	72	–183
General Popular Radical Union	253,384	19.89	60	+28
All People Front	73,411	5.76	15	+15
Democratic Coalition	53,693	4.21	11	New
Freethinkers' Party	50,137	3.94	7	+1
National Reform Party	17,822	1.40	4	New
Old Democratic Union of Crete	13,762	1.08	3	New
Hellenic Agricultural Party	13,006	1.02	1	New
Agricultural Democratic Party	12,333	0.97	1	New
Independents' Alliance	11,178	0.88	0	New
National Unionist Party	9,870	0.77	0	New
Communist Archio-Marxist Party	1,148	0.09	0	New
National Union of Greece	505	0.04	0	0
Communist International Front	296	0.02	0	New
Independents	7,203	0.57	0	–6
Total	1,273,996	100.00	300	0
Valid votes	1,273,996	99.68		
Invalid/blank votes	4,083	0.32		
Total votes	1,278,079	100.00		
Source: Nohlen & Stöver

== See also ==
- 4th of August Regime
