= National Solidarity (Greece) =

EAM resistance movement social welfare organization

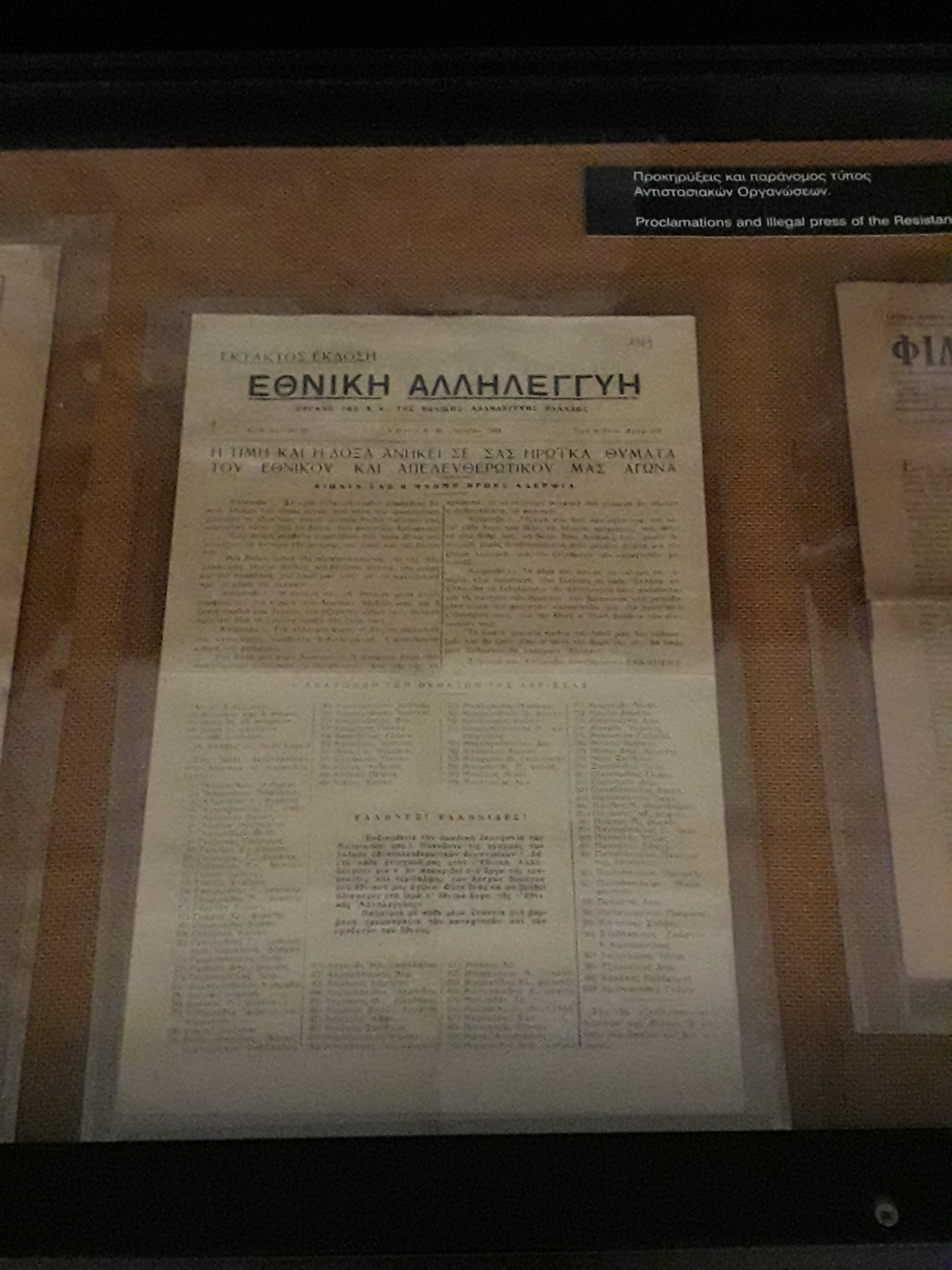
National Solidarity proclamation

National Solidarity (Greek: Εθνική Αλληλεγγύη, abbreviated E.A.) was the social welfare organization of the EAM resistance movement in occupied Greece during World War II.

The decision to establish a resistance organization was taken by Pantelis Karagitsis, Lefteris Apostolou and Aristotelis Bouras, who had just escaped from the internal exile imposed by the pre-war Metaxas Regime. National Solidarity was thus founded on 28 May 1941, barely a month into the Occupation, in a park behind the Soteria hospital. It was the first nationwide resistance group established in Greece. Its founding members were: Kleon Papaloizos, who was also elected its secretary, Vasileios Markezinis, Dionysia Papadomichelaki, Nikos Dresios, Georgios Vasilopoulos and Spyros Antypas.

The organization participated as a founding party in the creation of the National Liberation Front (EAM) in September 1941 and henceforth functioned as its welfare arm. For its role in feeding the people during the Occupation, it was nicknamed "the Mother of the Struggle".

== Sources ==
- Hagen Fleischer (1995). Crown and Swastika - Greece of the Occupation and the Resistance, Vol. 2 (in Greek). Athens: Papazissis Ed. ISBN 960-02-1079-9.
- "Οι αντιστασιακές οργανώσεις φύτρωναν σαν μανιτάρια" article in the Eleftherotypia newspaper, 8 April 2006 (in Greek)
