= Georgios Siantos =

20th-century Greek Communist Party leader and resistance fighter during WWII

Georgios Siantos (nicknames: Geros "Old man", Theios "Uncle"; Greek: Γεώργιος "Γιώργης" Σιάντος; 1890 – 20 May 1947) was a Greek politician and prominent figure of the Communist Party of Greece (KKE) who served as acting general secretary of the party, and as a leader of the National Liberation Front (EAM)/Greek People's Liberation Army (ELAS) Resistance movement during the German occupation of Greece in World War II.

== Early years ==
Georgios Siantos was an Aromanian. He was born in Karditsa, Thessaly in 1890; his parents were farmers. When he graduated from primary school, Siantos started working as a tobacco worker. He served in the Greek infantry as a sergeant during the Balkan Wars of 1912–1913 and World War I. By 1916 he had gone over to the liberals of Eleftherios Venizelos. Siantos also became involved in the labor movement, and, soon after his demobilization in 1920, he was elected president of the trade union of the tobacco workers in Karditsa.

== Political career until World War II ==
In 1922, Siantos was elected Secretary General of the Greek Confederacy of Tobacco Workers, while, during the same period, he became a member of the Socialist Labour Party of Greece (SEKE, Greek: Σοσιαλιστικό Εργατικό Κόμμα Ελλάδας, Sosialistiko Ergatiko Komma Elladas), the forerunner of KKE. In 1927 Siantos became a member of the central committee of the politburo of the party. During the internal ideological struggle of 1929–1931, Siantos as a leading member of the "left faction" was called to Moscow, where he accepted the admonitions of Comintern for unity in KKE. After his return to Greece, Siantos participated in the administration of General Confederation of Greek Workers, and in 1934 he was reelected in the central committee and the politburo of the party.

In 1936 Siantos was elected as a member of the Greek Parliament, but he was arrested for Communist-related activities after the declaration of the 4th of August Regime. He was displaced in Anafi, but he managed to escape. A year later, in 1939, he was re-arrested and served time in prison in Corfu, from where he escaped in 1941.

== Role during the Resistance and the Civil War ==
The same year Nikolaos Zachariadis, the General Secretary of KKE was transferred by the Germans to the Dachau concentration camp, and Siantos undertook the leadership of the party as acting Secretary General. During the German occupation of Greece from 1941–1944, Siantos led the Communist-dominated Greek National Liberation Army, and he also played an important role in the establishment of the Political Committee of National Liberation in 1944. The same year representatives from all political parties and resistance groups came together at a conference in Lebanon, seeking an agreement about a government of national unity. According to the September 1944 Caserta Agreement, all the resistance forces in Greece were placed under the command of a British officer, General Ronald Scobie. Siantos opposed the signing of both agreements, but he then was one of those who argued for their full implementation.

During the Dekevriana Siantos undertook the conduct of the military forces of EAM. After the intervention of the British forces in Greece led by Scobie in favor of the government, EAM was defeated, and Siantos faced a fierce criticism by his own comrades for his choices; even Zachariadis called him "agent of the British". In February 1945 Siantos led the delegation of KKE and EAM that negotiated the Treaty of Varkiza with the Greek government and the other political parties. He signed the Treaty but after only four months he turned the command of the party over to Zachariadis, who returned to Greece. He typically remained member of the politburo, but had no leverage on the party; the defeat of 1944 had cast a slur on his reputation within the party.

== Death and legacy ==
Siantos died of a heart attack on 20 May 1947 in Athens, at the private residence of the prominent Greek communist doctor Petros Kokkalis. In 1957, a special committee of KKE rehabilitated Siantos in the party's esteem.
