= National Council (Greece) =

Former legislative assembly in Greece

The National Council (Greek: Εθνικό Συμβούλιο) was a legislative assembly convened during the Axis occupation of Greece in May 1944, following elections organized by the National Liberation Front (EAM). Between 1.5 and 1.8 million Greeks voted in these elections, which were also the first elections Greek women were allowed to vote in. The ca. 208 members of the Council convened in the village of Koryschades, its first session lasting from 14 to 27 May. Following the Lebanon conference and the establishment of a national unity government comprising EAM and the Greek government in exile, its role was diminished, and shortly after the liberation of Greece, on 5 November, it was dissolved.

== Background ==
By the end of 1943, the National Liberation Front (EAM), sponsored by the Communist Party of Greece, and its armed wing, the Greek People's Liberation Army (ELAS), had emerged as by far the strongest faction in the Greek Resistance movement: ELAS alone numbered some 50,000 members, while EAM and its various subsidiary movements comprised over 500,000 people out of Greece's seven-million-strong population. In the liberated areas under its control in the mountainous interior of the country, as well as in the occupied areas and the major urban centres, EAM established its own administration, culminating in the 25-strong EAM Central Committee. As EAM's power grew and its competition with the British-backed Greek government in exile in Cairo became more pronounced, in early 1944 EAM decided to set up a fully-fledged parallel government, the Political Committee of National Liberation (PEEA), to administer the liberated areas—a "Free Greece" comprising about half of the country's area and 2.5 million people—and to apply pressure on the government in exile for its reformation into a national unity government with the participation of EAM ministers.

== Elections for the National Council ==
To legitimize this move, in late April EAM held elections across Greece. The PEEA decree on holding the elections foresaw two ways of voting, one with the direct election of the national councillors, and one indirectly via electors representing localities as well as professional or other groupings. It was left to the various areas to decide which method they would implement.

These were the first Greek elections in which women were allowed to vote, and where the voting age limit was lowered to 18. As the elections had to be carried out in conditions of secrecy in the occupied areas, no electoral registers were kept, but it is estimated that between 1.5 and 1.8 million people voted. By way of comparison, in the January 1936 elections, the last to be held in Greece before the war (and the imposition of the authoritarian Metaxas Regime), only 1,278,085 people (all men) voted. Eastern Macedonia and Western Thrace, which were under Bulgarian occupation, as well as most of the islands except Euboea and Lefkada, did not participate in the election, due to the much more repressive occupation regime in the former, and the delay of the PEEA order in reaching the latter. George Couvaras, a Greek-American OSS agent present in "Free Greece" at the time, reported that "the election was a pretty fair one", and that it demonstrated the ascendancy of EAM over the old pre-war political system as well as the widespread rejection of the monarchy among the populace. The exact number of councillors is uncertain, but the best estimate is at least 208. Among them were 24 (most sources erroneously mention 22) Members of Parliament from the last pre-war assembly of 1936, who were invited to participate in the National Council in a move designed to highlight the PEEA's self-portrayal as the legitimate successor of the pre-war (and pre-Metaxas Regime) democratic government. The elected councillors represented a broad cross-section of Greek society: 2 bishops and 2 priests, 5 university professors, 8 generals and 6 lower-ranking officers, 20 civil servants, 5 industrialists, 15 doctors of medicine, 25 lawyers, 22 labourers, 23 farmers, 10 newspapermen, 10 scientists, 9 high school teachers, etc. Among them, for the first time in Greek history, were five women.

== Work of the Council and dissolution ==
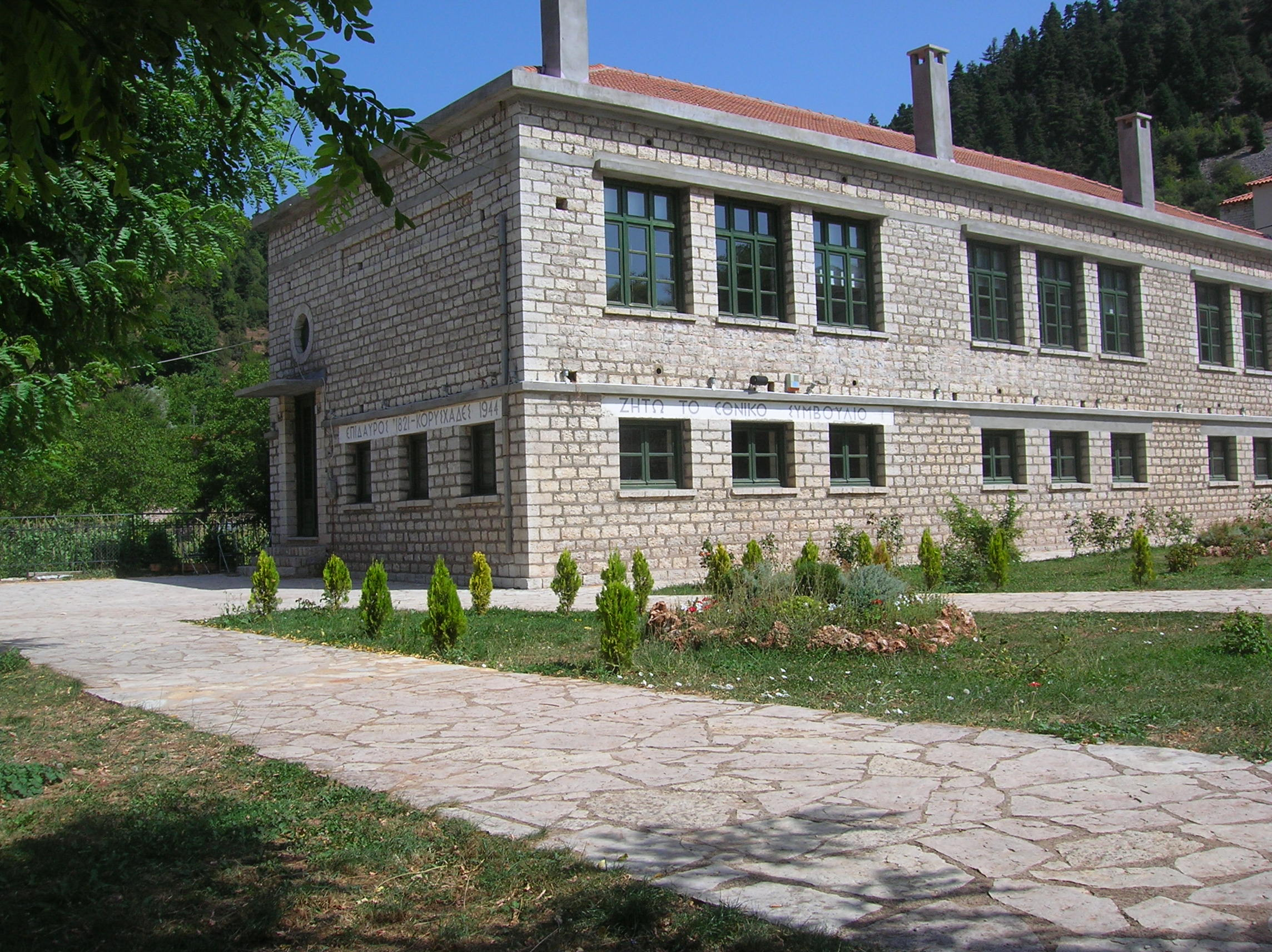
The primary school building of Koryschades, where the National Council sessions took place

The Council convened for the first time on 14 May 1944 in the village of Koryschades in the mountains of Evrytania. Following a blessing by the Metropolitan of Kozani, Joachim, the national councillors took their oath of office:

I swear that I will faithfully carry out my duties, as a member of the National Council, guided by the interest of the Fatherland and of the Greek people. That I will fight with self-denial for the liberation of the country from the conquerors' yoke, that I will defend everywhere and always the people's liberties and will be an assistant and guide of the people in its struggle for its liberty and its sovereign rights."

The Council sat in its first and only session from 14 to 27 May 1944. The old liberal general Neokosmos Grigoriadis was elected speaker, with the Metropolitan Joachim as deputy speaker. After sending official greetings to the Allied governments, including Yugoslavia and China, the assembly heard a number of reports by the PEEA ministers on the military situation, on "people's justice", on agricultural and educational reform, on finance and labour rights, etc. In its final session, the Council adopted a Charter for "Free Greece". The charter also defined the Council's role: while on the one hand it vowed to fight to the end for the liberation from the Germans and the "restoration of national unity and popular sovereignty", it also declared that the Council might be dissolved before liberation if proposed by its own members—a clear implication that EAM was prepared to dissolve its rival parliament if it were admitted into the royal Greek government in exile. The issue sparked a series of mutinies in the Greek armed forces in the Middle East, which were suppressed by the British and loyalist Greek officers. In the end, in the Lebanon conference, EAM was obliged to accept a reduced participation in a cabinet of national unity headed by Georgios Papandreou. With the withdrawal of the Germans and the establishment of the Papandreou government in Athens in October, the Council dissolved itself on 5 November 1944.

== Sources ==
- Clogg, Richard (2013). A Concise History of Modern Greece (Third ed.). Cambridge University Press. ISBN 978-1-10761203-7.
- Papastratis, Procopis (2006). "Local Government in Liberated Areas of Occupied Greece". In Bruno De Wever; Herman Van Goethem; Nico Wouters (eds.). Local Government in Occupied Europe (1939-1945). Gent: Academia Press. pp. 205–220. ISBN 9038208928.
- Skalidakis, Yannis (2015). "From Resistance to Counterstate: The Making of Revolutionary Power in the Liberated Zones of Occupied Greece, 1943–1944". Journal of Modern Greek Studies. 33 (1): 155–184. doi:10.1353/mgs.2015.0000. S2CID 141718083.
- Stavrianos, L.S. (2000). The Balkans since 1453. C. Hurst & Co. Publishers. ISBN 1-85065-551-0.
