= Periklis Rallis =

Greek politician

Periklis Rallis (Greek: Περικλής Ράλλης) (1891 – August 20, 1945) was a Greek People's Party politician. He was three times Minister of the Interior of Greece, twice under the Second Hellenic Republic and once after the restoration of the monarchy in 1935.

Preceded by Georgios Chloros	Minister of the Interior of Greece; 1935	Succeeded by Panagis Tsaldaris
Preceded by Panagis Tsaldaris	Minister of the Interior of Greece; 1935	Succeeded by Giorgios Schinas
Preceded by Filippos Manouilidis	Minister of the Interior of Greece; 1945	Succeeded by Georgios Athanasiadis-Novas
