= Union of People's Democracy =

Union of People's Democracy Ένωση Λαϊκής Δημοκρατίας
- President: Alexandros Svolos
- General Secretary: Ilias Tsirimokos
- Founded: 1941
- Dissolved: 1953
- Merged into: Democratic Party of Working people
- Ideology: Socialism; Anti-fascism
- Political position: Centre-left to left-wing
- National affiliation: EAM

The Union of People's Democracy (Greek: Ένωση Λαϊκής Δημοκρατίας, ΕΛΔ; Énosi Laikís Dimokratías, ELD) was a Greek political party, established in 1941, during the Nazi occupation. It took part in the group of political parties that formed the National Liberation Front (EAM). Leader of the party was Alexandros Svolos and general secretary was Ilias Tsirimokos.

After the occupation, changed its name into the Socialist Party – Union of People's Democracy (Σοσιαλιστικό Κόμμα – Ένωση Λαϊκής Δημοκρατίας) and then collaborated with the Democratic Party of Working People (DKEL). In January 1950, the party issued its programme, which was printed by the party newspaper Machi ("battle"). With the publication of its programme, the party declared its participation in the Democratic Block that took part in the elections of March 5, 1950, where it provided 8 of 18 Members of Parliament coming from the block.
