= Agrarian Party of Greece =

Defunct political party in Greece

Agrarian Party of Greece Αγροτικό Κόμμα Ελλάδος
- Leader: Kostas Gavriilidis
- Founded: 1923
- Dissolved: 1946
- Ideology: Agrarian socialism Left-wing nationalism Anti-fascism
- Political position: Left-wing

The Agrarian Party of Greece (Greek: Αγροτικό Κόμμα Ελλάδος) was a Greek left-wing political party from 1923 to 1946.

== History ==
The party was established in March 1923 at the second Panhellenic Agrarian Congress. In the December 1923 elections it won three seats. In the 1926 elections it won four seats.

The party did not contest the 1928 elections, but returned in 1936, winning a single seat in the elections that year. The party did not contest any further elections.

On 27 September 1941, the Agricultural Party of Greece participated in the National Liberation Front, the biggest resistance organization during the Greek Resistance.
