= Ioannis Sofianopoulos =

Greek politician (1887–1951)

Ioannis Sofianopoulos (Greek: Ιωάννης Σοφιανόπουλος; 10 August 1887 – 27 July 1951) was a Greek politician.

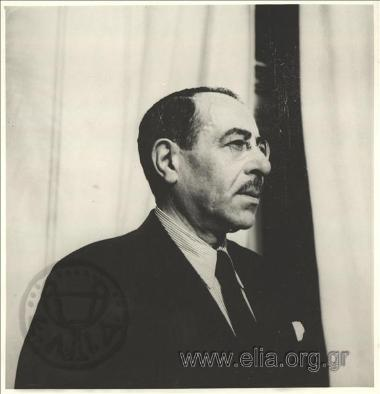
Ioannis Sofianopoulos in Cairo in 1944

Born in Sopoto, Kalavryta, to the lawyer Andreas Sofianopoulos and Athena Papageorgiou, he studied Law at the University of Athens. During the 1920s, he visited various parts of the Balkans describing his impressions in a series of articles and books. He was elected a member of parliament for the Serres constituency in the 1933 Greek election, representing the Farmers' Party. He served twice as Foreign Minister of Greece between 1945 and 1946. From 1950 to 1951 he served again as a member of parliament, representing the Democratic Alignment.

== Publications ==
- Economical and political study on the Balkan States and on Central and Eastern Europe, Athens 1927
- Geographical, political and geo-economical studies on the basin of the Danube, the Balkan peninsula and of East Mediterranean
