= List of Greek Resistance organizations =

During the period of the Axis Occupation of Greece in the Second World War, a multitude of Resistance organizations sprang up. A May 1943 report of the Intelligence Bureau of the Greek government in exile mentioned 33 active groups, a number that increased to 79 in a joint British report of 17 October 1943. According to some sources, the number was as high as 140. These numbers include groups of vastly different natures, which can be roughly divided in three categories: the major organizations, which displayed significant regional or nationwide action, including guerrilla operations against the Occupation authorities; the small political groupings, mainly active in Athens, with a limited following and engaged mainly in political propaganda and small-scale sabotage; and a small number of groups focused on intelligence and sabotage operations, in direct cooperation with the British secret services in the Middle East.

== Major organizations ==
These were organizations with a political agenda, usually progressive, republican and with more or less socialist tendencies. They all developed guerrilla forces, but with the exception of the National Liberation Front, none succeeded in becoming a true nationwide mass movement and were confined to the regions where they were first established.

=== National Liberation Front (EAM) ===
The National Liberation Front (Ethniko Apeleftherotiko Metopo, ΕΑΜ) was the largest organization, with a membership estimated between half and two million and maybe up to 150,000 fighters. It was formed on 27 September 1941 out of several leftist parties and organizations, such as the Socialist Party of Greece (ΣΚΕ), the Union of People's Democracy (ΕΛΔ), and the Agricultural Party of Greece (ΑΚΕ), but the central role was played by the Communist Party of Greece (ΚΚΕ). From 1943 onwards, EAM came into increasing conflict with the other Resistance groups. The parties and organizations that functioned within EAM included:

- the Greek People's Liberation Army (ELAS), the movement's armed guerrilla wing
- the Greek People's Liberation Navy (ELAN), the auxiliary naval force of ELAS
- the National Labour Liberation Front (EEAM), which functioned as EAM's trade union
- the National Solidarity (E.A.), EAM's welfare wing
- the United Panhellenic Organization of Youth (EPON), EAM's youth wing, formed from the amalgamation of ten leftist youth organizations in February 1943
- the Organization for the Protection of the People's Fighters (OPLA), the Communist Party's paramilitary security force
- the Slavic-Macedonian National Liberation Front (SNOF)

=== National Republican Greek League (EDES) ===
The National Republican Greek League (Ethnikos Dimokratikos Ellinikos Syndesmos, EDES) was the second-largest organization, founded on 9 September 1941. Its military wing, the National Groups of Greek Guerrillas (EOEA), were active mainly in the Epirus area, but part of its political wing in Athens engaged in collaboration with the Nazis. Included:

- the National Groups of Greek Guerrillas (EOEA), military wing
- the Northern Epirus Liberation Front (MAVI), a branch based in Albanian territory under the leadership of Vasilios Sahinis

=== National and Social Liberation (EKKA) ===
The National and Social Liberation (Ethniki kai Koinoniki Apeleftherosis, EKKA), founded by Dimitrios Psarros, was the smallest and last of the three main Resistance groups to be formed, in the autumn of 1942. Its military wing, the 5/42 Evzone Regiment was active mainly in eastern Central Greece before its bloody dissolution by ELAS troops in April 1944 and the murder of Psarros.

=== YVE/PAO ===
The Defenders of Northern Greece (Υπερασπισταί Βορείου Ελλάδος, YVE) was founded by a group of Greek army officers in July 1941. Its membership was drawn mostly from the pre-war military and the still functioning state administration, and politically belonged to the right, professing loyalty to the Greek government in exile and King George II. YBE initially focused on smuggling fighters into the Middle East, where they were to join the Free Greek Forces of the Greek government-in-exile, while its main goal was halting Bulgarian encroachment in Macedonia. In early 1943, YVE was transformed into Panhellenic Liberation Organization (PAO) and embraced armed struggle after being encouraged by agents of the British Special Operations Executive (SOE) to assist them in the execution of Operation Animals, an Allied diversionary operation. PAO participated in the Battle of Fardykambos, but shortly came into conflict with ELAS. ELAS emerged victorious and the remnants of PAO began operating under the umbrella of the Security Battalions organized by the collaborationist government in Athens, committing numerous atrocities.

=== National Organization of Crete (EOK)/ Supreme Committee of Cretan Struggle (AEAK) ===
The first armed resistance group in Crete, the Supreme Committee of Cretan Struggle (AEAK) was founded in June 1941 in Chania shortly after the end of the Battle of Crete. It was headed by Andreas Papadakis, Ioannis Paizis, Andreas Polentas, Titos Georgiadis and Ioannis Ioannidis. It closely collaborated with the SOE, supplying it with fake documents through the German appointed mayor of Chania and double agent Nikolaos Skoulas. AEAK was dissolved in February 1943 and transformed into the National Organization of Crete (Ethniki Organosi Kritis, EOK) in June of the same year. It was headed by Skoulas, Charidimos Polychronidis, Iosif Voloudakis, Emmanouil Basias and Markos Spanoudakis. Despite their ideological differences, EAM and EOK agreed to sign non-aggression pacts during the meetings of Theriso (7/11/1943) and Tromarissa (15 September 1944).

== Minor groups ==
These groups were confined to Athens and its suburbs, and engaged primarily in political propaganda, through the publication of various proclamations and newspapers. In terms of membership, they were small, centered around a leader, with members largely drawn from his family and friends, and often overlapping with other groups. Generally, their members were young, and the political programs they espoused were mostly republican and socialist. There were, however, exceptions, such as the groups formed by royalist army officers.

=== Panhellenic Union of Fighting Youths (PEAN) ===
The Panhellenic Union of Fighting Youths (PEAN) was perhaps the most active of the small urban resistance groups. It was founded in October 1941 by the Air Force Lieutenant Kostas Perrikos. Aside from its political activities, PEAN is most notable for carrying out two of the largest urban sabotage acts of the entire Occupation: the bombings of the pro-Nazi Organisation of the National Forces of Greece (OEDE) and National-Socialist Patriotic Organisation (ESPO) organizations in August and September 1942. Although the main core of the group was soon after betrayed to the Germans and executed, the organization continued to function, albeit largely limited to a purely political role, until Liberation.

=== Army of Enslaved Victors ===
The Army of Enslaved Victors (Stratia Sklavomenon Nikiton, SSN) was founded by Kostas Perrikos, Andreas Gyftakis and Nikolaos Mylonas in June 1941 and published its first proclamation in October of that year. At that point, Perrikos left the group to found PEAN. From December 1942, SSN published its own paper, "Greater Greece" (Megali Ellas).

=== Sacred Brigade ===
The Sacred Brigade (Iera Taxiarchia, IT) was founded also by Kostas Perrikos in June 1942, but appeared openly on its own only in August 1942. Closely cooperating with PEAN and the "Omiros" group, it printed its own newspaper, the monthly "Hellenic Youth" (Ellinika Neiata), with over 3,000 copies. In June 1943, it fused with PEAN.

=== Hellenic Army ===
The Hellenic Army resistance organization (Ellinikos Stratos, ES) was formed by ex-Army officer Colonel Giannakopoulos. Its area of operation was limited to the Peloponnese. ES came close to merging with EAM-ELAS in April 1943, however its leadership was spurred to turn against ELAS by British intelligence agents; leading to an official declaration of war in August 1943. The two resistance organizations fought a series of battles until October 1943, whereupon ES was dissolved and many of its officers enlisted into ELAS.

=== Military Hierarchy ===
Alexandros Papagos during 1943 established with other Army officers, a resistance organization, the Military Hierarchy. In July of the same year, however, he was arrested by the German occupation authorities and transported to Germany's concentration camps as a prisoner.

=== RAN ===
RAN (Rumelia-Avlona-Nisoi) was another small armed urban resistance group, based in Athens. It was under the command of the Venizelist general Konstantinos Ventiris. During the Dekemvriana it fought with the government forces against EAM-ELAS. Its acronym derived from its post-war territorial claims, i.e. (Eastern) Rumelia, Avlona (and Northern Epirus) and the Italian-occupied Dodecanese Islands.

=== Battalion 122 ===
Battalion 122 (Tagma 122) was a resistance group created by Greek American volunteers in 1944. The number 122 in the name of the Battalion was a symbolic number, symbolized the years from the beginning of the Greek revolution of 1821.

== Intelligence and sabotage groups ==
These were small organizations, which functioned mainly in the big cities. They were not politically active, but focused solely on obtaining intelligence on the Axis forces in Greece, as well as carrying out several sabotage missions and helping Allied military personnel to escape to Middle East or to the neutral Turkey. Most of these were led by former military officers, and functioned under the supervision of either the British Special Operations Executive (SOE) or the Inter-Services Liaison Department (ISLD) of the Secret Intelligence Service (MI6).

=== Bouboulina ===
The "Bouboulina" group was founded on 10 May 1941 by Lela Karagianni and her family and named after Laskarina Bouboulina, a heroine of the Greek War of Independence. Initially, the group focused on helping Allied soldiers to flee to the Middle East. Gradually, the group established an effective intelligence network, engaged in sabotage acts and was collaborating with EDES of Napoleon Zervas. It also smuggled 80 Jews to Turkey. However, on 11 July 1944 Karagianni was betrayed and arrested, being executed two months later.

=== Omiros ===
The "Omiros" ("Homer") group was founded in September 1941, and established contact with the ISLD in April 1942. Active in the wider Athens area, including the harbour of Piraeus, Corinth and Thessaloniki, it eventually spread over much of the Greek mainland. It was led by Colonel Stylianos Kitrilakis and Lt Colonel Konstantinos Dovas, both of whom would rise to significant positions in the post-war royalist establishment. Another notable member was Stylianos Pattakos, later member of the Greek junta of the Colonels.

=== Maleas and Aliki ===
The "Maleas" group (named after Cape Malea) was founded in late 1941 by Navy Captain Alexandros Levidis, and was initially focused on aiding the escape of British servicemen to the Middle East. Eventually, in October 1942, the group was split in two: "Maleas 1", under the control of ISLD, with Commander Evgenios Valasakis as its head, carried on with the intelligence-gathering operations, while "Maleas 2" under Levidis continued to aid the escape of Allied personnel, in cooperation with MI9. "Maleas 1" was later renamed to "Syrios" ("the Syrian") and finally to "Aliki" ("Alice"). From August 1943, it was under the direction of Commander Konstantinos Hasiotis.

=== Midas 614 ===
The "Midas 614" group was founded by Free Greek Forces Major Ioannis Tsigantes in June 1942. Tsigantes was tasked by the MO4 with sabotaging the Corinth Canal and establishing an intelligence gathering network in Greece. Midas 614 established its headquarters in Athens while also absorbing the "Delphoi" intelligence network. Tsigantes unsuccessfully attempted to unite the various resistance organizations operating in the city, the Corinth Canal operation was likewise not carried out. Midas 614 created an extensive intelligence gathering network operating across Greece, a secret submarine landing station at Kymi and a secret mail service between Athens and Smyrna. Tsigantes was betrayed and killed in a shoot out with Italian soldiers on 14 January 1943. On 31 March, Geheime Feldpolizei raided the remaining Midas 614 hideouts in Nea Smyrni, seizing their wireless sets and arresting the operators; leading to the collapse of the organization.

=== Kodros ===
The "Kodros" group (named after King Codrus) was founded in October 1942 by the retired Lt Commander Panagiotis Lykourezos. It was the third group under ISLD control, and was active mainly in the Athens area.

=== Odysseus and Prometheus II ===
The two agents "Odysseus" and "Prometheus II" had been enlisted by the Special Operations Executive already before the outbreak of the war, and were the service's main Greek operatives in occupied Greece. "Odysseus" was the codename of Gerasimos Alexatos, a professional smuggler, while "Prometheus II" was Navy officer Charalambos Koutsogiannopoulos. Alexatos made frequent trips to Turkey, acting as a courier and bringing back money, instructions and equipment. Later, his team would act as the liaison between SOE and EAM, while the "Prometheus II" team took on the liaison with EDES. "Prometheus II" continued to function until its radio team, together with Koutsogiannopoulos, was seized by the Germans on 3 February 1943.

=== Apollon ===
The "Apollo" (Apollon) group was founded by Ioannis Peltekis, a member of "Prometheus II" who had fled to Turkey upon that organization's destruction by the Germans in 1943. He soon returned to Athens, authorized by SOE to create a new group. Under his direction, Apollon became one of the largest intelligence organizations in wartime Europe, with over 500 agents. Peltekis quickly succeeded in freeing Prometheus leader Koutsogiannopoulos from jail, and his organization provided the British with accurate information on Axis shipping, air defenses, and aircraft deployments, smuggling downed Allied pilots (and after the Italian surrender, high-ranking Italian officers) out of the country, as well as engaging in extensive sabotage activity.

=== Vyrones ===
The "Vyrones" group was founded immediately after the German invasion of Greece by journalist Giannis Iordanidis and Loukas Linaras. In June 1941, Iordanidis came into contact with British intelligence agent Walter Charley, helping him evacuate over 200 stranded British soldiers to the Middle East. "Vyrones" also developed an intelligence gathering network and participated in numerous acts of sabotage including the destruction of two Axis planes at the Tatoi Airport in November 1941 and an unsuccessful attempt to block the Corinth Canal.

=== Organization X ===
Organization X (Greek: Οργάνωσις Χ), commonly referred to simply as X ("Chi" in Greek). X was founded in 1941 by General Georgios Lavdas with Colonel Georgios Grivas acting as his chief of staff. Lavdas soon came into conflict with other members of the group because of his radical monarchist ideology. Tis led him to depart X with a small group of officers and create another resistance organization known by the acronym E.E. The remaining members of X recognized Grivas as their new commander. X's efforts revolved around gathering intelligence for the Allied cause, minor anti-German actions, and transport of volunteers to the Middle East. However, with the EAM's meteoric rise to prominence within the Greek resistance movement, X shifted its attention towards combating EAM and other affiliated Communist groups. Following the Italian surrender to the Allies in September 1943, X began purchasing weapons from the Axis authorities, later welcoming hundreds of members of collaborationist organizations such as the EEE and Security Battalions who sought to avoid persecution as liberation seemed imminent.

== Sources ==
- Alexiades, Platon (2015). Target Corinth Canal 1940–1944. Barnsley: Pen and Sword Military. ISBN 9781473827561.
- Gerolymatos, André (1992). British Intelligence and Guerrilla Warfare Operations in the Second World War: Greece 1941-1944, A Case Study (PhD thesis). McGill University.
- Gyftopoulos, Dimitris (1990). Μυστικές Αποστολές στην Εχθροκρατούμενη Ελλάδα 1941-1944 [Secret Missions into Occupied Greece 1941-1944] (in Greek). Athens: Dodoni. ISBN 9602480378.
- Hatzianastasiou, Tasos (2001). "Ο πρώτος γύρος του εμφυλίου πολέμου στη γερμανοκρατούμενη δυτική πλευρά του Στρυμόνα, Σεπτέμβριος-Δεκέμβριος 1943" [The First Round of the Civil War in the German Governed Western Part of Strymonas, September–December 1943]. The Civil Wars: Local Aspects of the Greek Civil War. Kozani Tsotili: Conference: The Civil Wars Study Group: 173–188.
- Kamarinos, Aristos (2015). Ο εμφύλιος πόλεμος στη Πελοπόννησο 1946-1949 [The Civil War in the Peloponesse (1946-1949)] (in Greek). Athens: Syghroni Epoxi. ISBN 9789602248720.
- Koukounas, Demosthenes (2013). Η Ιστορία της Κατοχής [History of the Occupation] (in Greek). Vol. II. Athens: Livani. ISBN 978-960-14-2687-7.
- Kousouris, Dimitris (2015). Δίκες τών Δοσίλογων 1944-1949 [Trials of Collaborationists 1944-1949] (in Greek). Athens: Polis. ISBN 9789604354610.
- Stefanidis, Yiannis (1992). "Macedonia in the 1940s" (PDF). Modern and Contemporary Macedonia. 2: 64–103.
- Fleischer, Hagen (1990). Στέμμα και Σβάστικα: Η Ελλάδα της Κατοχής και της Αντίστασης, Τόμος Α' [Crown and Swastika: Greece of the Occupation and the Resistance, Vol. 1] (in Greek). Athens: Papazissis. ISBN 960-02-0764-X.
- Fleischer, Hagen (1995). Στέμμα και Σβάστικα: Η Ελλάδα της Κατοχής και της Αντίστασης, Τόμος Β' [Crown and Swastika: Greece of the Occupation and the Resistance, Vol. 2] (in Greek). Athens: Papazissis. ISBN 960-02-1079-9.
- Lymberatos, Michalis P. (2007). "Οι οργανώσεις της Αντίστασης" [The organizations of the Resistance]. In Hatziiosif, Christos; Papastratis, Prokopis (eds.). Ιστορία της Ελλάδας του 20ού αιώνα, Γ' Τόμος: Β' Παγκόσμιος Πόλεμος. Κατοχή - Αντίσταση 1940–1945, Μέρος 2ο. [History of Greece in the 20th Century, Volume III: World War II. Occupation and Resistance 1940–1945, Part 2] (in Greek). Athens: Bibliorama. pp. 9–67. ISBN 978-960-8087-06-4.
