= Vasileios Tellidis =

- Born: 29 September 1958 (age 68); Kokkinochoma, Kavala
- Military career
- Allegiance: Greece
- Branch: Hellenic Army
- Rank: General
- Commands: Chief of the Hellenic Army General Staff; Inspector-General of the Hellenic Army; Commander of the Supreme Military Command of the Interior and Islands

Vassilios or Vasileios Tellidis (Greek: Βασίλειος Τελλίδης; born 29 September 1958) is a Hellenic Army officer who in 2015–2017 served as Chief of the Hellenic Army General Staff.

== Biography ==
Vasileios Tellidis was born in Kokkinochoma, Kavala Prefecture, on 29 September 1958. He attended the Hellenic Army Academy, from which he graduated in 1980 as a Cavalry–Armour Second Lieutenant. As an armour officer, he attended the various schools of his arm of service, as well as the Armoured Cavalry Branch Training School in France. In addition, he received training as a paratrooper. As a senior officer, he graduated from the Supreme War School of Greece, the Collège interarmées de Défense, and the National Defence School of Greece.

He served in various armour units as a company officer, staff officer, and commander. In 2005–08 he was defence attaché in France, after which he served as head of the Directorate of Defence Planning and Programming at the Hellenic National Defence General Staff (HNDGS) until 2011. He then served briefly as Director of the HNDGS 3rd Branch, before being appointed First Deputy Chief of the Hellenic Army General Staff (2011–12). In 2012–13 he served as commander of the Supreme Military Command of the Interior and Islands, then in 2013–14 as Inspector-General of the Army, in 2014–15 as commander of the First Army, before being appointed on 25 February 2015 to the post of Chief of the Hellenic Army General Staff. Along with the chiefs of staff of the Navy and the Air Force, he was dismissed by decision of the KYSEA on 16 January 2017 and replaced by Lt. General Alkiviadis Stefanis, until then commander of the III Army Corps.

Lt. General Tellidis is married and has two sons. He speaks English and French.

Military offices
| Preceded by Lt General Christos Manolas | Chief of the Hellenic Army General Staff; 25 February 2015 – 16 January 2017 | Succeeded by Lt General Alkiviadis Stefanis |
