= Tselios =

Tselios (Greek: Τσέλιος) is a surname. Notable people with the surname include:

- Alexandra Tselios, Australian entrepreneur, social commentator and business columnist
- Athanasios Tselios (born 1956), Greek retired Hellenic Army officer
- Ilias Tselios (born 1997), Greek footballer
- Nikos Tselios (born 1979), American professional ice hockey player
- Paraskevas Tselios (born 1997), Greek male volleyball player
