= Alkiviadis Stefanis =

Greek army officer (born 1959)

Minister of National Defence
- In office 26 May 2023 – 27 June 2023
- Prime Minister: Ioannis Sarmas
- Preceded by: Nikos Panagiotopoulos
- Succeeded by: Nikos Dendias

Civil Administrator of Mount Athos
- Incumbent
- Assumed office 6 August 2024
- Prime Minister: Kyriakos Mitsotakis
- Preceded by: Anastasios Mitsialis

Personal details
- Born: 7 October 1959 (age 66) Athens, Greece

Military service
- Allegiance: Greece
- Branch/service: Hellenic Army
- Years of service: 1978–2019
- Rank: General (ret.)
- Commands: Adjutant to the President of the Hellenic Republic; Chief of the Hellenic Army General Staff; Commander of the III Army Corps/NRDC-GR

General Alkiviadis Stefanis (Greek: Αλκιβιάδης Στεφανής; born 7 October 1959) is a Greek politician, retired officer of the Greek Armed Forces. He served as Chief of the Hellenic Army General Staff from 2017 to 2019. He served as a non-parliamentary Deputy Minister for National Defence in the government of Kyriakos Mitsotakis from 9 July 2019 to 31 August 2021. From 26 May to 27 June 2023, he was Minister of National Defence in the Caretaker Government of Ioannis Sarmas.

== Military career ==
Stefanis was born on October 7, 1959, in Athens. He attended the Hellenic Army Academy, from which he graduated in 1982 as a cavalry–armour second lieutenant. As a junior armour officer, he served in various tank units as squad and company commander, completed the US Army's Armored Advanced Course at Fort Knox in 1994, and then served for two years in the Hellenic Army's Armour School at Avlonas. In 1997, he attended the Superior War School, going on to command the 98th National Guard Armour Battalion at Lesbos from 1998 to 2000.

In 2000–2002 he served as army adjutant for the president of the Hellenic Republic, Konstantinos Stephanopoulos. During that period he completed an MBA in Crisis Response Operations. From 2002–2005, he served as operations staff officer in the Greek military delegation to NATO headquarters. In 2005–2007 he served as director of the Armed Forces Transformation Bureau at the Hellenic National Defence General Staff. During this period he completed correspondence courses at the National Defence Academy.

Following promotion to colonel in 2007, he served as chief of staff to the 23rd Armoured Brigade, and in 2008 completed an MBA on Security Strategies at the US National Defense University with distinction. On his return to Greece he was appointed deputy commander of the 50th Infantry Brigade in 2009. Promoted to brigade general in 2010, he served as head of the Defence Planning Directorate of the Hellenic Army General Staff (HAGS), and commander of the 23rd armoured Brigade in 2011–2013.

In 2013 he was promoted to major general and director of the HAGS 4th Branch (Organization, Planning and Training). In July of the same year he served as operational commander of the EU international exercise MILEX 13. In 2014 he was appointed commander of the 95th National Guard Higher Command, before returning to command 4th Branch/HAGS. In March 2016 he was promoted to lieutenant general and commander of the III Corps/NRDC-GR, until he was chosen as Chief of the HAGS on 16 January 2017.

On 25 January 2019, the Government Council for Foreign Affairs and Defence, as part of a major reshuffle of the military leadership, announced his replacement by Lt. General Georgios Kambas. According to Greek press reports, Stefanis had been a leading contender for the vacant position of Chief of the Hellenic National Defence General Staff, but lost out to the air force chief, Christos Christodoulou, who enjoyed a closer working relationship with the previous Chief of the HNDGS, and now Minister for National Defence, Admiral Evangelos Apostolakis. Stefanis was promoted to the rank of full general and retired from service on 1 February 2019, handing over his office to Lt. General Kambas.

== Political career ==
From 9 July 2019 he is serving as Deputy Minister of National Defence as a non-political member in the Cabinet of Kyriakos Mitsotakis, under Minister Nikos Panagiotopoulos.

On 23 October 2019, he was given the role of special coordinator for all government agencies in the context of the European migrant crisis, and the refugees located in the eastern Aegean islands. Following the re-establishment of the Ministry of Immigration and Asylum, this extensive authority was revoked in February 2020.

== Decorations ==
- Grand Commander of the Order of Honour
- Grand Commander of the Order of the Phoenix
- Cross of Honour and Military Merit of Luxembourg
- Various meritorious service and command commemorations of the Hellenic Armed Forces

Military offices
| Preceded by Ioannis Baltzois | Adjutant to the President of the Hellenic Republic; 2000–2002 | Succeeded by Dimitrios Reskos |
| Preceded by Vasileios Tellidis | Chief of the Hellenic Army General Staff; 2017–2019 | Succeeded by Georgios Kambas |
Political offices
| Preceded by Nikos Panagiotopoulos | Minister of National Defense; 2023 | Succeeded by Nikos Dendias |
| Preceded by Anastasios Mitsialis | Civil Administrator of Mount Athos; 2024–present | Incumbent |
