= Giorgos Dalakouras =

Greek politician (1938–2021)

Giorgios Dalakouras
- Γιώργος Δαλακούρας

Civil Administrator of Mount Athos
- In office 17 September 2004 – 29 April 2010
- Preceded by: Aristos Kasmiroglou
- Succeeded by: Aristos Kasmiroglou

Member of the European Parliament
- In office January 1981 – 18 October 1981

Member of the Hellenic Parliament
- In office 17 November 1974 – January 1981

Personal details
- Born: 8 July 1938 Athens, Kingdom of Greece
- Died: 8 July 2021 (aged 83)
- Party: New Democracy

Giorgios Dalakouras (Greek: Γιώργος Δαλακούρας; 8 July 1938 – 8 July 2021) was a Greek politician, shipowner and businessman. He served in the national Hellenic Parliament from 1974 to 1981 as a member of the New Democracy party. In January 1981, he became one of the first Greek Member of the European Parliament following Greece's ascension into the European Union. Dalakouras served as the Civil Administrator of Mount Athos, the civil head of government for the monastic community of Mount Athos, from 2004 to 2010.

== Biography ==
Dalakouras was born in 1938 in Athens, Kingdom of Greece. He graduated from the former Supreme School of Economics and Business (ASOEE), which is now known as the Athens University of Economics and Business.

He entered the Greek shipping industry. Dalakouras gradually established his own shipping fleet and founded Dalex Shipping Co S.A., which became a major Greek shipping line. He is credited with establishing new Greek-Iranian and Greek-Turkish economic relations through the shipping industry.

Dalakouras also worked in real estate and the Greek tourism industry. He helped to restore the historic centre at Chora and the Monastery of Saint John the Theologian - both located on the Aegean island of Patmos. These Patmos locations were later declared to the UNESCO World Sites.

Dalakouras was elected to the Hellenic Parliament in 1974 as a member of the New Democracy party. He won re-election in 1977 and served as an MP until January 1981. In January 1981, he became one of the first Greek Member of the European Parliament following Greece's ascension into the European Union. He served as a Greek MEP from January 1981 until October of the same year. Dalakouras was a member of the European Parliament Committee on Transport and Tourism from February 1981 to October 1981 during his tenure in Brussels.

Dalakouras was appointed the Civil Administrator of Mount Athos, the civil head of government for the monastic community of Mount Athos, on 17 September 2004. He served until 2010, when he was succeeded by Aristos Kasmiroglou, who had also preceded him.

Dalakouras became head of the "Bicephalus 1924" company in 2013, which was responsible for the renovation of AEK Athens' Olympic Stadium in Athens.

Giorgios Dalakouras died on 8 July 2021, at the age of 83. He was survived by his wife, Eleni Dalakura, and their four children: Katerina, Dimitris, Vassilis and Michalis. Several of children also work in the shipping industry or became academics in London.
