= Dimitrios Giatzis =

- Δημήτριος Γιατζής
- Born: c. 1891; Lamia, Kingdom of Greece
- Died: 1 June 1964 (aged 72–73)
- Military career
- Allegiance: Kingdom of Greece
- Branch: Hellenic Army
- Service years: 1910–1941; 1945–1949
- Rank: Lieutenant General
- Commands: 3rd Infantry Division (Chief of Staff); II Army Corps (Staff); VI Border Sector; Chief of Staff of the Infantry Inspectorate; III Infantry Brigade; 9th Infantry Division; I Army Corps; Chief of the Hellenic Army General Staff
- Wars: Balkan Wars: First Balkan War; Second Balkan War; World War I: Macedonian front; Greco-Turkish War (1919-1922); World War II: Greco-Italian War; Battle of Greece; Greek Civil War
- Awards: Cross of Valour in Gold (twice)

Dimitrios Giatzis (Greek: Δημήτριος Γιατζής, 1891–1964) was a senior Hellenic Army officer who held senior commands during the Greek Civil War of 1946–49, serving as commander of First Army and Chief of the Hellenic Army General Staff in 1947–49.

== Life ==
Dimitrios Giatzis was born in Lamia in 1891, and enlisted in the Hellenic Army as a volunteer on 12 March 1910. Promoted to NCO, he took part in the Balkan Wars of 1912–13, and after studies at the NCO School was commissioned as an Infantry Second Lieutenant on 27 December 1914.

He subsequently fought on the Macedonian front during World War I and in the Asia Minor Campaign, first as a company commander and later as a staff officer, being promoted to Lieutenant in 1917 and to captain in 1920. In the interwar period he served successively as battalion commander, chief of staff of the 3rd Infantry Division, in the staff of II Army Corps, in the Administrative Directorate of the Ministry for Military Affairs, commander of VI Border Sector (1938–40) and briefly chief of staff of the Infantry Inspectorate, before assuming command of III Infantry Brigade in September 1940. During this period he advanced to Major (1923), Lt. Colonel (1931), and Colonel (1935).

He led III Brigade during the first months of the Greco-Italian War, and was appointed chief of infantry to 8th Infantry Division in January 1941, a post in which he remained until the Greek capitulation following the German invasion of Greece in April.

Following liberation he joined the re-forming Army, and was named briefly commander of the 2nd National Guard Division in January 1945, before assuming command of the 9th Infantry Division in the next month. On 15 May 1946, he was appointed commander of the newly re-established I Army Corps at Athens, and in February 1947 he became the first commander of the newly formed First Army at Volos. He was moved to the post of Chief of the Hellenic Army General Staff on 1 November, a post he held concurrently with the ad hoc function of Commander-in–chief of the Army following the disbandment of First Army in March 1948, until 20 January 1949, when he retired from service at his own request.

Dimitrios Giatzis died in 1964.

Military offices
Preceded by Lt General Konstantinos Ventiris	Chief of the Hellenic Army General Staff; 1 November 1947 – 20 January 1949	Succeeded by Lt General Georgios Kosmas
