= Christos Manolas =

Greek hellenic army officer (born 1959)

- Χρίστος Μανωλάς
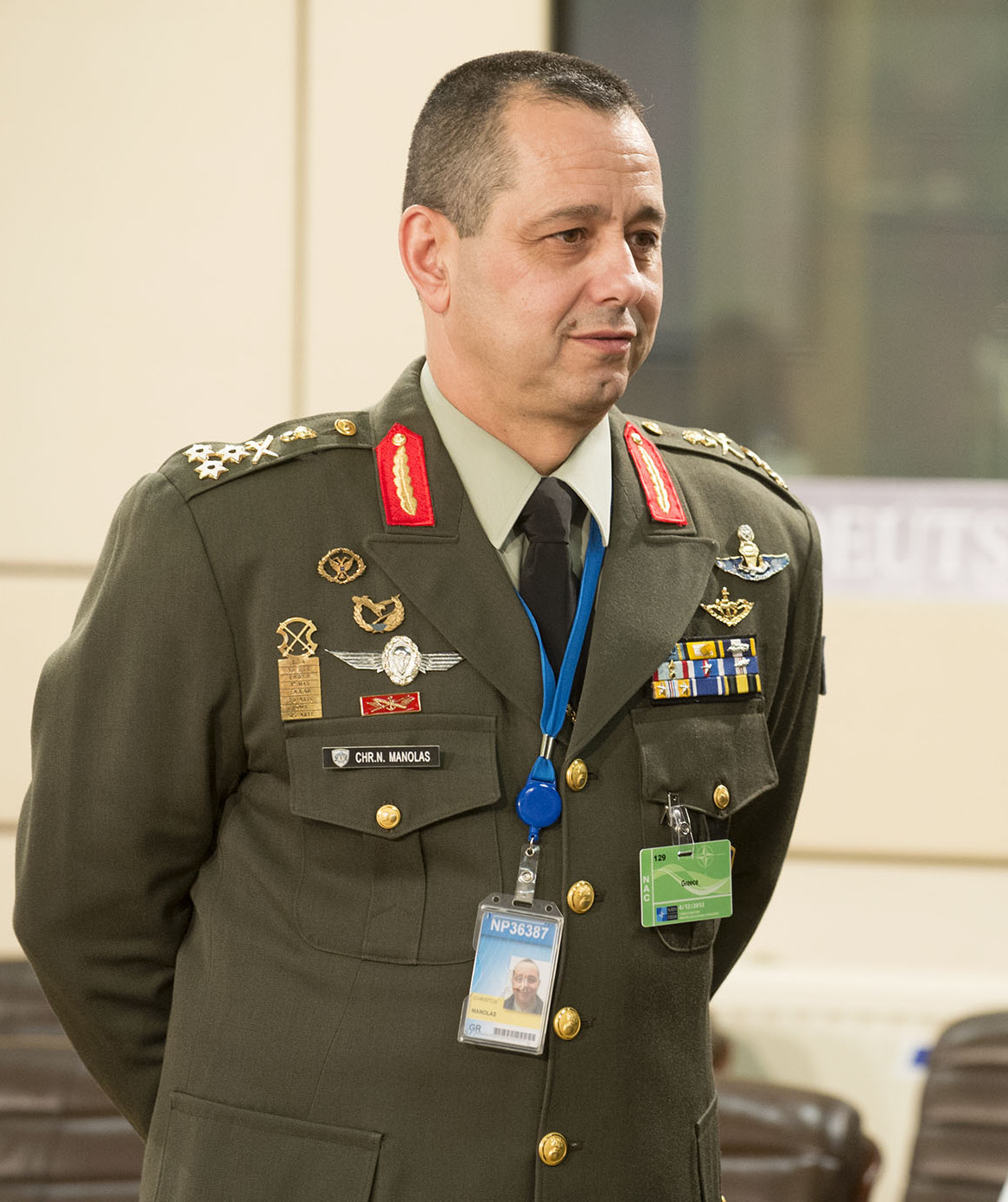
- General Manolas in a meeting at NATO headquarters in Brussels (2012).
- Born: 19 February 1959 (age 67); Athens, Kingdom of Greece
- Education: Hellenic Military Academy
- Military career
- Allegiance: Greece
- Branch: Hellenic Army
- Service years: 1976–2015
- Rank: General
- Commands: Chief of the Hellenic Army General Staff; Commander of the First Army; National Military Representative of Greece in the EU and NATO; Assistant Chief of Staff of NATO's Supreme Headquarters Allied Powers Europe; Commander of the BELUGA group in SFOR in Bosnia-Herzegovina
- Deployments: SFOR
- Awards: Grand Commander of the Order of Honour; Gold Cross of the Order of the Phoenix; Medal of Military Merit 1st Class

General Christos Manolas (Greek: Χρίστος Μανωλάς; born February 19, 1959) is a Greek retired Hellenic Army officer and the former Chief of the Hellenic Army General Staff (24 February 2014 – 25 February 2015).

== Career ==
Born in Athens, he entered the Hellenic Army Academy in 1976 and graduated in 1980 as an Infantry 2nd Lieutenant. He followed a career in the Hellenic Army's special forces, including as a company commander in the Special Forces Training Centre (1981–82) and in the 2nd Paratrooper Squadron (1982–86), followed by a stint as an instructor in the NATO International Long Range Reconnaissance Patrol School in Germany (1986–88). On his return he served as instructor in Greece's Unconventional Warfare Training Centre (1988–91), as commander of the elite Special Paratrooper Unit (ΕΤΑ) (1991–93) and of the 5th Special National Guard Battalion (1993–95). He also graduated from the Hellenic Navy's elite special warfare Underwater Demolition Unit (MYK).

In 1995–96 he was deputy commander in the Hellenic Army's Unorthodox Warfare Training Centre, before going on to command the Greek force (ΕΛΔΥΒ) participating in SFOR in Bosnia-Herzegovina, as well as the wider BELUGA (Belgium-Luxemburg-Greece-Austria) group of which the Greek force formed part.

On his return from Bosnia he studied in Greece's Supreme War School (1998–99), commanded the 1st Paratrooper Squadron (1999–2000), served as instructor on special operations in the Supreme War School (2000–01), head operations officer in NATO Joint Command Southcentre in Larissa (2001–04) interrupted by a brief term as commander of the Greek battalion in ISAF (Dec. 2002 until May 2003), and chief of staff of the 1st Raider/Paratrooper Brigade (2004–05). In 2005–08 he served as Assistant Chief of Staff (ACOS) J9 of NATO's Supreme Headquarters Allied Powers Europe, and as head of the National and International Planning Directorate in the Hellenic National Defence General Staff in 2008–09. He subsequently served as commander of the 79th National Guard Higher Command (2009–10), of the Army's NCO Academy (2010–11), and of the 95th National Guard Higher Command (2011–12), as Greece's national military representative in the EU and NATO (2012–13), and as commander of First Army (2013–14).

On 19 February 2014, the Government Council for Foreign Affairs and Defence (KYSEA) decided his appointment as Chief of the Hellenic Army General Staff, succeeding Athanasios Tselios, with the transfer ceremony to take place on 24 February. On 25 February 2015, the KYSEA decided his retirement, promoting him to the rank of full General in retirement and the title of Honorary Chief of the Army General Staff, and his replacement with Lt. General Vasileios Tellidis.

== Personal life ==
General Christos Manolas is married and has two daughters. He speaks fluently English, German, Bulgarian and Serbo-Croatian, and has a working knowledge of Italian and Spanish.

== Notable quotes ==
As Lt Colonel, Christos Manolas, upon arriving in Afghanistan on 19 February 2002, he uttered the following quote: "For us really it is a great pleasure and great pride to be here. Because as you are aware, Alexander the Great has been here some 2300 years ago. And therefore it's the first time after that that we have Greek troops in the region."

Military offices
| Preceded by Lt General Athanasios Tselios | Chief of the Hellenic Army General Staff; 24 February 2014 – 25 February 2015 | Succeeded by Lt General Vasileios Tellidis |
