= Athanasios Tselios =

- Native name: Αθανάσιος Τσέλιος
- Born: 17 July 1956 (age 70); Petroporos, Trikala, Kingdom of Greece
- Allegiance: (Greece) Third Hellenic Republic
- Branch: Hellenic Army
- Rank: General
- Commands: Commander of the Hellenic Military Academy; 7th Mechanized Infantry Brigade; Army NCO School; 16th Mechanized Infantry Division; IV Army Corps; Chief of the Hellenic Army General Staff
- Awards: Grand Commander of the Order of Honour; Grand Cross of the Order of the Phoenix; Medal of Military Merit 1st Class
- Education: Hellenic Military Academy

Athanasios Tselios (Greek: Αθανάσιος Τσέλιος; born July 17, 1956) is a retired Hellenic Army officer and former Chief of the Hellenic Army General Staff (9 March 2013 – 24 February 2014).

Born in Petroporos, Trikala Prefecture, he graduated from the Hellenic Military Academy in 1979 as an Infantry 2nd Lieutenant. He followed a career in the Hellenic Army's special forces, commanding the Special Forces Training Centre in 2004–06. He went on to command the Hellenic Military Academy in 2006–07, the 7th Mechanized Infantry Brigade in 2007–08, the Army NCO Academy in 2008–10, the 16th Mechanized Infantry Division in 2010–11 and the IV Army Corps in 2011–13. He was appointed Chief of the Hellenic Army General Staff on 9 March 2013.

On 19 February 2014, the Government Council for Foreign Affairs and Defence decided his retirement, with the rank of full General, and his replacement by the commander of First Army, Lt. Gen. Christos Manolas, with the transfer ceremony to take place on 24 February.

Gen. Athanasios Tselios is married and has a daughter.

Military offices
Preceded by Lt General Konstantinos Ginis	Chief of the Hellenic Army General Staff; 9 March 2013 – 24 February 2014	Succeeded by Lt General Christos Manolas
