= EPSO =

EPSO may refer to:

- European Personnel Selection Office, agency to hire staff for the European Union
- Hellenic Socialist Patriotic Organisation, a collaborationist organization in Greece during World War II
- Evolutionary particle swarm optimization and enhanced particle swarm optimization, types of particle swarm optimization
