= Big Smoke =

The Big Smoke may refer to:

- Dublin, Ireland
- London, England
- Toronto, Canada
  - Big Smoke Burger, an international restaurant chain based in Toronto, Ontario, Canada
- Jack Johnson, referred to as "Big Smoke"
  - The Big Smoke, a book about Johnson by Adrian Matejka
- Big Smoke (Grand Theft Auto), a character in Grand Theft Auto: San Andreas
- The Big Smoke (publication), an Australian opinion site, also with an American version
- The Big Smoke (novel), a 1959 novel by Australian writer D'Arcy Niland
