= Panagiotis Spiliotopoulos =

Greek Army officer (c. 1891–c.1962)

- Παναγιώτης Σπηλιωτόπουλος
- Born: c. 1891; Mazeika, Kalavryta, Kingdom of Greece
- Died: c. 1962; Kingdom of Greece
- Military career
- Allegiance: Kingdom of Greece; (Greece) Second Hellenic Republic
- Branch: Hellenic Army
- Service years: 1910–1948
- Rank: Lieutenant General
- Commands: Infantry Commander of the 1st Infantry Division; 15th Infantry Division; Chief of the Hellenic Army General Staff; Inspector-General of the Hellenic Army
- Wars: Balkan Wars: First Balkan War; Second Balkan War; World War I: Macedonian front; Greco-Turkish War (1919–22); World War II: Greco-Italian War; Battle of Greece; Greek Civil War: Dekemvriana
- Other work: Minister for National Defence; Minister for Northern Greece; General Secretary of the Hellenic Red Cross

Panagiotis Spiliotopoulos (Greek: Παναγιώτης Σπηλιωτόπουλος; 1891–1962) was a Hellenic Army officer who rose to the rank of Lieutenant General and held the post of Chief of the Hellenic Army General Staff in 1946–1947, during the first stages of the Greek Civil War. He also served briefly as Minister of National Defence, Minister for Northern Greece and Secretary General of the Hellenic Red Cross.

== Life ==
He was born in the village of Mazeika near Kalavryta in 1891. He joined the Hellenic Army as a volunteer in 1910 and fought in the Balkan Wars of 1912–1913. He subsequently entered the NCO Academy and graduated as an Infantry Second Lieutenant in April 1914. He also fought in the Macedonian front of World War I and participated in the Greco-Turkish War of 1919–1922, being promoted to Lieutenant (1916) and Captain (1918) in the process.

He occupied a series of staff and command posts in the interwar years, rising to Major (1923), Lt Colonel (1930) and Colonel (1934). At the same time, he pursued Law studies in the University of Athens. In 1937–1940, he commanded the Reserve Officers School. During the Greco-Italian War, he served as Infantry Commander of the 1st Infantry Division and later CO of the newly raised 15th Infantry Division.

In 1944, at the eve of the Germans' departure from Greece, Spiliotopoulos was appointed the representative in Athens and its suburbs of the Allies' Middle East High Command. Following liberation in October 1944, Spiliotopoulos became head of the Athens Military Command, and soon after commander of the new Officers' Training Centre before being appointed Chief of the Hellenic Army General Staff on 16 May 1946, a post he held until 19 February 1947. From then until his retirement on 30 March 1948 he served as Inspector-General of the Army.

Following his retirement, he became General Secretary of the Hellenic Red Cross, and served as Minister of National Defence under Sofoklis Venizelos between 30 July and 27 October 1951, and as Minister for Northern Greece from 5 March to 17 May 1958 in the interim government of Konstantinos Georgakopoulos.

He died in 1962.

Political offices
Preceded by Sofoklis Venizelos	Minister of National Defence of Greece; 30 July – 27 October 1951	Succeeded by Alexandros Sakellariou
Preceded by Vasileios Paparrigopoulos	Minister for Northern Greece (interim minister); 5 March – 17 May 1958	Succeeded by Avgoustos Theologitis
Military offices
Preceded by Lt General Georgios Dromazos	Chief of the Hellenic Army General Staff; 16 May 1946 – 19 February 1947	Succeeded by Lt General Konstantinos Ventiris
