= Psycharis =

Psycharis (Greek: Ψυχάρης) is a surname. Notable people with the surname include:

- Ioannis Psycharis (1854–1929), Russian philologist
- Stavros Psycharis (1945–2022), Greek politician
