= Stavros Psycharis =

Greek publisher and politician (1945–2022)

Civil Administrator of Mount Athos
- In office 1996–2001
- Preceded by: Georgios Martzelos
- Succeeded by: Aristos Kasmiroglou (acting)

Personal details
- Born: 1945; Athens, Greece
- Died: 2 August 2022 (aged 77); Porto Rafti, Greece
- Occupation: Publisher, politician

Stavros Psycharis (Greek: Σταύρος Ψυχάρης; 1945 – 2 August 2022) was a Greek publisher and politician. He served as Civil Administrator of Mount Athos from 1996 to 2001.

Psycharis died in Porto Rafti, Greece on 2 August 2022.
