= Caserta Agreement =

1944 agreement between the Greek exiled government, British Command, EAM/ELAS, and EDES

- Location: Caserta, Italy
- Signatories: Greek government-in-exile, EAM, EDES

The Caserta Agreement was signed on 26 September 1944, between the Greek exiled government (under Georgios Papandreou), the British Command in the Middle East, EAM/ELAS and EDES in Caserta, Italy. The agreement provided that all the resistance forces that were operating until then in Greece would be under the leadership of the Greek government, which would then be under the control of General Ronald Scobie.

The Caserta Agreement was achieved despite intense concerns on the part of the Communist Party of Greece (KKE) and extreme right-wing circles. The concern in the ELAS classes during the Caserta Agreement was intense. As soon as Aris Velouchiotis, the head of ELAS, was informed of it, he convened a concentration of ELAS commanders in Lamia where he proposed the violent seizure of power. However, the majority of the rebels were reluctant to risk this, as they would find themselves against the Allies, and the attempt to create another unclear regime would be rather inappropriate.

What was exactly discussed in the Caserta Agreement is not known. However, the EAM leadership had decided to change policy and with Soviet pressure became more conciliatory. In total contradiction to the previous conditions which EAM had demanded under the control of the new Greek government, and participate in the government of National Unity abandoning its previous demands for specific ministries. The government was formed on 15 August 1944 with the participation of six members from EAM. In the following weeks, with the gradual withdrawal of the German occupying forces from Greece, there was a widespread alarm, both in the Papandreou government and on the British side, at the dominant role of ELAS in the liberated areas.

Despite the attempts to avoid civil war, the Battle of Athens broke out in December 1944, pitting ELAS against the troops of the government, the police, the former Security Battalions, and British forces in the country.
