= Civil Administrator of Mount Athos =

- Incumbent; Alkiviadis Stefanis since August 6, 2024
- Residence: Karyes, Mount Athos
- Inaugural holder: Nikolaos P. Batestatos
- Formation: 15 December 1926

The civil administrator of Mount Athos (Greek: Πολιτικός διοικητής του Αγίου Όρους) is the civil head of government of the territory of the monastic community of Mount Athos, an autonomous region in northern Greece. His seat is Karyes, Mount Athos. There are several other offices established in Thessaloniki and Ouranoupoli. Since 3 September 2019, the incumbent civil administrator is businessman and Archon Offikialios of the Ecumenical Patriarchate of Constantinople, Athanasios Martinos.

Per Greek law, the civil government of Mount Athos falls under the jurisdiction of the Ministry of Foreign Affairs of Greece, with the Civil Administration of Mount Athos being responsible for exercising it locally. According to article 29 of the charter of the Ministry of Foreign Affairs, the Civil Administration of Mount Athos consists of the civil administrator of Mount Athos (similar to a regional governor in the rest of Greece), the deputy civil administrator and the rest of their staff, permanent or not.

== List of civil administrators of Mount Athos ==
No.	Civil Administrator	Term of office			Profession
No.	Civil Administrator	Took office	Left office	Length of office	Profession
1	Nikolaos P. Batestatos †	15 Dec. 1926	10 June 1927	178 days	
2	Nikolaos Lelis (Acting)	15 June 1927	26 Febr. 1929	1 year, 252 days	
3	Zisis Hatzivasiliou	8 Jan. 1930	8 Νov. 1931	1 year, 301 days	
4	Ioannis Kokotakis	8 Nov. 1931	1 Dec. 1931	24 days	
5	Ioannis Petridis	1 Dec. 1931	2 Apr. 1932	124 days	
6	Nikolaos Damtsas	24 May 1932	20 Apr. 1933	332 days	
7	Alexandros Tsorbatzis	9 May 1933	24 Aug. 1933	108 days	
8	Periklis Noulis	24 Aug. 1933	15 May 1937	3 years, 262 days	
9	Konstantinos Valtis	20 May 1937	26 June 1937	38 days	
10	G. Paraskevopoulos (Acting)	1 July 1937	9 July 1937	9 days	
11	Andreas Panourgias	11 July 1937	8 Dec. 1938	1 year, 148 days	
12	Aristidis Fokas	8 Dec. 1938	6 March 1941	2 years, 87 days	
13	Vasilios Karfiotakis	9 July 1941	26 Jan. 1944	2 years, 198 days	
14	Dimitrios Papadimitriou	17 March 1945	Nov. 1947	~ 2 years, 5 months	
15	Renos Pyrgos	Jan. 1948	Αug. 1948	~ 6 months	
16	Panagiotis Panagiotakos	16 Sept. 1948	15 June 1950	1 year, 9 months	
17	Konstantinos Papakyriakou	June 1950	June 1950	—	
18	Nikolaos Kourasis	Aug. 1950	Dec. 1951	~ 1 year, 4 months	
19	Konstantinos S. Konstantopoulos	1951	1964	~12 years	
20	Emmanouil Rounis	July 1964	1967	~ 2 years, 6 months	
21	Stavros Papadatos	14 Aug. 1967	Aug. 1971	~ 4 years	
22	Konstantinos Karadimitropoulos	Aug. 1971	15 Sept. 1973	~ 2 years, 2 months	
23	Dimitrios Krekoukias	28 Sept. 1973	May 1975	~ 1 year, 7 months	
24	Dimitrios Tsamis	June 1975	September 1981	~ 6 years, 3 months	
25	Vasilios Pseftogas	September 1981	November 1982	~ 1 year, 2 months	
26	Vasilis Stogianos †	May 1983	18 July 1985	~ 2 years, 2 months	Theologian
27	Apostolos Glavinas	July 1985	1989	~ 4 years	Theologian and writer
28	Konstantinos Loulis	1989	1991	~ 2 years	Businessman and politician
29	Nikolaos–Ioannis Papadimitriou Doukas	1991	1993	~ 2 years	Prefect of Chalkidiki Prefecture (1978–79) and Pieria (1979-81)
30	Georgios Martzelos	May 1994	October 1996	~ 2 years, 5 months	Theologian and writer
31	Stavros Psycharis	1996	2001	~ 5 years	Publisher
32	Aristos Kasmiroglou (Acting)	2001	2004	~ 3 years	Lawyer
33	Giorgos Dalakouras	2004	2010	~ 6 years	Shipowner, MP and MEP
(32)	Aristos Kasmiroglou	2010	2018	~ 8 years	Lawyer
34	Konstantinos Dimtsas	August 2018	August 2019	~ 1 year	Journalist
35	Thanasis Martinos	October 2019	July 2023	~ 4 years	Businessman and shipowner
36	Anastasios Mitsialis	December 2023	August 2024	8 months	Honorary ambassador
37	Alkiviadis Stefanis	August 6, 2024	incumbent	In Office	f.Minister of National Defence; General (ret.)
