= Konstantinos Ventiris =

Greek lieutenant general (c. 1892–c. 1960)

- Κωνσταντίνος Βεντήρης
- Konstantinos Ventiris c. late 1940s
- Born: c. 1892; Kalamata, Kingdom of Greece
- Died: c. 1960 (aged 67–68); Athens, Kingdom of Greece
- Military career
- Allegiance: Kingdom of Greece; (Greece) Second Hellenic Republic
- Branch: Hellenic Army
- Service years: 1910–1935; 1943–1951
- Rank: Lieutenant General
- Commands: 7th Infantry Division (Chief of Staff); III Army Corps; First Army; Epirus-West Macedonia Headquarters; Chief of the Hellenic Army General Staff
- Wars: Balkan Wars: First Balkan War; Second Balkan War; World War I: Macedonian front; Greco-Turkish War (1919–1922); World War II: Greek Resistance; Greek Civil War: Dekemvriana
- Awards: Commander's Cross of the Cross of Valour
- Other work: General Adjutant to King Paul

Konstantinos Ventiris (Greek: Κωνσταντίνος Βεντήρης, 1892–1960) was a Hellenic Army officer who rose to the rank of lieutenant general. He served twice as Chief of the Hellenic Army General Staff and was one of the senior government commanders during the Greek Civil War. He is also one of the few recipients the country's highest wartime decoration, the Commander's Cross of the Cross of Valour.

== Life ==
He was born in Kalamata in 1892, the second of seven children. His brothers became journalists, and the eldest, Georgios, was an associate of the Liberal leader Eleftherios Venizelos. After completing his school studies, he joined the Hellenic Army as a volunteer on 1 April 1910, and fought in the Balkan Wars of 1912–1913. He entered the NCO Academy and graduated in March 1914 as an Infantry Second Lieutenant. During World War I, he served in the Macedonian front, being promoted to lieutenant in 1917 and acting as a company commander during the 1918 Allied offensive. In 1919 he was promoted to major, and fought as battalion commander and CO of the 23rd Regiment in the Asia Minor Campaign of 1919–1922.

In late 1922 he was appointed as chief of staff of the 7th Infantry Division, and was promoted to lieutenant colonel in 1923. He then served as CO of the 1st and 41st Infantry Regiments. In 1930 he was promoted to full colonel, serving as military attaché to Yugoslavia and Czechoslovakia, Director of the General Staff's Second Bureau (Intelligence) and as Deputy Commandant of the War College. As a confirmed Venizelist and Republican, he was dismissed from the army in the aftermath of the failed Republican March 1935 coup attempt.

During the Axis Occupation of Greece, he founded the RAN resistance group, but in 1943 he fled to the Middle East and rejoined the Armed Forces of the Greek government in exile. He also participated in the spring 1944 Lebanon conference of all Greek resistance and political factions. With the rise of the Communist-controlled National Liberation Front to a dominant position in the Greek Resistance, Ventiris, like many other Venizelist officers, increasingly moved to right-wing and pro-monarchical views. In the Middle East and later in Greece, he became the leader of the anti-communist "Officers' League", one of the three major political groupings within the Army. Despite his ardent anti-communism, as an ex-Liberal he was a rare figure among the monarchist army leadership, and was often the target of right-wing newspapers for his former Republican views.

In June 1944 he was appointed as Chief of the Army General Staff for the Greek Armed Forces in the Middle East, being promoted to Major General (backdated to 1943) at the same time. He organized the repatriation of the Army, returning to Athens on 12 November. Thereafter he served as Deputy Chief of the General Staff, and with the outbreak of the Greek Civil War he was appointed CO of III Army Corps. Promoted to lieutenant general in 1946, he became again Chief of the Army General Staff in 1947, then served as CO of the First Army, as Inspector-General of the Army and as CO of the Epirus-West Macedonia Headquarters until his retirement on 24 March 1951. His role in the final victory of the National Army in the Greek Civil War was considerable; according to US general James Van Fleet, who commanded the Joint U.S. Military Advisory Group to Greece, he was "often rated the best military commander in Greece".

In the same year, he was awarded with the Commander's Cross of the Cross of Valour, one of only three career Army officers to receive it alongside Anastasios Papoulas and Alexandros Papagos. In August 1951, he was also named General Adjutant to King Paul.

Ventiris was unmarried, and died in 1960 in Athens.

== Sources ==
- Συνοπτική Ιστορία του Γενικού Επιτελείου Στρατού 1901–2001 [A Concise History of the Hellenic Army General Staff 1901–2001] (in Greek). Athens: Hellenic Army History Directorate. 2001. ISBN 960-7897-44-7.
- Close, David H.; Veremis, Thanos (1993). "The Military Struggle, 1945–9". In Close, David H. (ed.). The Greek Civil War, 1943-1950: Studies of Polarization. London: Routledge. pp. 97–128. ISBN 9780415021128.

Military offices
Preceded by Major General Efstathios Liosis as Deputy and Interim Chief of the General Staff	Chief of the Hellenic Army General Staff; 1 June – 27 November 1944	Succeeded by Major General Efstathios Liosis as Interim Chief of the General Staff
Preceded by Lt General Panagiotis Spiliotopoulos	Chief of the Hellenic Army General Staff; 19 February – 1 November 1947	Succeeded by Lt General Dimitrios Giatzis
