= Kostas Perrikos =

Greek soldier (1905–1943)

Kostas Perrikos (Greek: Κώστας Περρίκος; 23 April 1905 – 4 February 1943) was a Greek Air Force officer and leader of the PEAN resistance movement in World War II. He is the father of the UN arms control Commissioner Dimitris Perrikos (Δημήτρης Περρίκος).

== Early years ==
Perrikos was born in Kallimasia on the island of Chios, then part of the Ottoman Empire (it became part of Greece in 1912), where he received his elementary education. His family later moved to Alexandria, where he completed high school. He returned to Greece in 1925 and in 1926 he entered the Air Force Academy, which he left with a commission as a lieutenant. Perrikos was a fervent Republican who had been dismissed from the Air Force after the failed Venizelist coup attempt in March 1935. He was married to Maria Deligiorgi, with whom he had three children.

== During World War II ==
After the outbreak of the Greco-Italian War in October 1940, Perrikos requested to return to duty. His request was granted on 23 November 1940 and he was forwarded to the front.

In June 1941, Perrikos was a founding member of the "Army of Enslaved Victors" (Στρατιά Σκλαβωμένων Νικητών, SSN), one of the first resistance groups to spring up after Greece was overrun by the Germans in April 1941. Dissatisfied by the SSN's neutrality on the crucial issue of the post-war regime in Greece (monarchy or republic), Perrikos and a number of others split off to form the "Panhellenic Union of Fighting Youths" (Πανελλήνιος Ένωσις Αγωνιζόμενων Νέων, PEAN). PEAN had a leftist political orientation, strongly opposed any return of the monarchy and insisted on active struggle against the occupying forces.

=== ESPO bombing ===
PEAN's most spectacular act of sabotage was the bombing of the collaborationist ESPO headquarters on 20 September 1942. ESPO (Ελληνική Σοσιαλιστική Πατριωτική Οργάνωσις, Hellenic Socialist Patriotic Organization) was the largest Nazi organization in Greece. ESPO was trying to recruit volunteers for a "Greek Legion" to fight in the Eastern Front alongside the Germans.

ESPO was housed in a four-storey building located on the corner of Gladstonos and Patission streets in central Athens. Sabotaging it was a challenging feat as the building also accommodated the headquarters of the German Secret Field Police in Athens and the surrounding area was frequented by locals. The bombing operation was planned and executed by Perrikos and three others, namely Antonis Mytilinaios, Spyros Galatis and Ioulia Bimba. They prepared a 12 kgr dynamite bomb, which they smuggled and planted underneath ESPO's offices. Approximately 40 ESPO members and 6 Germans were wounded, many of which lethally. The attack was widely publicized and praised by Allied radio stations, and marked the end of the ESPO and of German attempts to recruit Greeks into the Wehrmacht. Other Greek resistance organizations like EAM reacted with skepticism, attributing the bombing to a provocation by the Gestapo.

== Execution and aftermath ==
On 11 November 1942 Perrikos and 12 of his partners were arrested after being betrayed. One month later, he was court marshaled and sentenced three times to death and to 15 years of imprisonment. He was executed by firing squad on 4 February 1943 at Kaisariani.

Perrikos was posthumously promoted to the rank of Wing Commander. On 2 September 1987, a bronze bust of Perrikos was unveiled near the ESPO building in Gladstonos street.
