= Panhellenic Union of Fighting Youths =

Resistance organization during the Axis occupation of Greece in WWII

- Leaders: Kostas Perrikos; Panagiotis Kanellopoulos
- Dates active: 1941–1944
- Active regions: Athens
- Ideology: Greek nationalism Republicanism; Venizelism; Liberalism; Social democracy Anti-communism; Anti-fascism
- Wars: the Greek Resistance

The Panhellenic Union of Fighting Youths (Greek: Πανελλήνιος Ένωσις Αγωνιζόμενων Νέων, Panellínios Énosis Agonizómenon Néon, ΠΕΑΝ, PEAN) was an anti-Nazi and anti-fascist movement that took part in the Greek resistance during the Axis Occupation of Greece in the Second World War. The organization was concentrated in the areas of Athens and Piraeus, and although it never expanded to become a wider movement, it was one of the most active of the multitude of urban resistance groups that sprung up during the Occupation, and one of the first to carry out active resistance, in the form of bombings.

== History ==
=== Foundation and political aims ===
Kostas Perrikos in Air Force uniform, before the Occupation.

The organization was founded in October 1941 by a Chiot Air Force Lieutenant, Kostas Perrikos. Perrikos was a fervent Republican who had been dismissed from the Air Force after the failed Venizelist coup attempt in March 1935. In June 1941, he was a founding member of the "Army of Enslaved Victors" (Στρατιά Σκλαβωμένων Νικητών, SSN), one of the first resistance groups to spring up after Greece was overrun by the Germans in April 1941. However, Perrikos was dissatisfied by the SSN's neutrality on the crucial issue of the post-war regime (monarchy or republic), and together with a number of others, split off to form the PEAN. The founding members of PEAN were, aside from Perrikos, lawyer Athanasios Dimitrios Skouras, who was chosen as president of the Governing Commission, the lawyers Ioannis Katevatis and Georgios Alexiadis, the merchant Dionysios Papavasilopoulos, the doctor Nikolaos Ailianos and Konstantinos Eleftheriadis. Some of them were members of Panagiotis Kanellopoulos' National Unionist Party, and Kanellopoulos himself would become the group's political mentor. Through Kanellopoulos, PEAN would develop close cooperation with another organization, the "Sacred Brigade" (Ιερά Ταξιαρχία, ΙΤ).

Politically, PEAN, like most other similar groups formed in that period, was leftist-socialist, advocating "social justice" and state takeover of crucial sectors of the industry, while being vehemently opposed to any return of the monarchy in the person of King George II. What set it apart from the majority of them, however, was its insistence on active struggle against the occupying forces. Nevertheless, from the outset, PEAN was engaged in a war of words with both the royalist right and the Communist Party-controlled National Liberation Front (EAM), which at the time rejected PEAN's calls for sabotage acts and condemned them as "urban terrorism", a bitter feud that would continue throughout the Occupation.

=== The ESPO bombing and aftermath ===
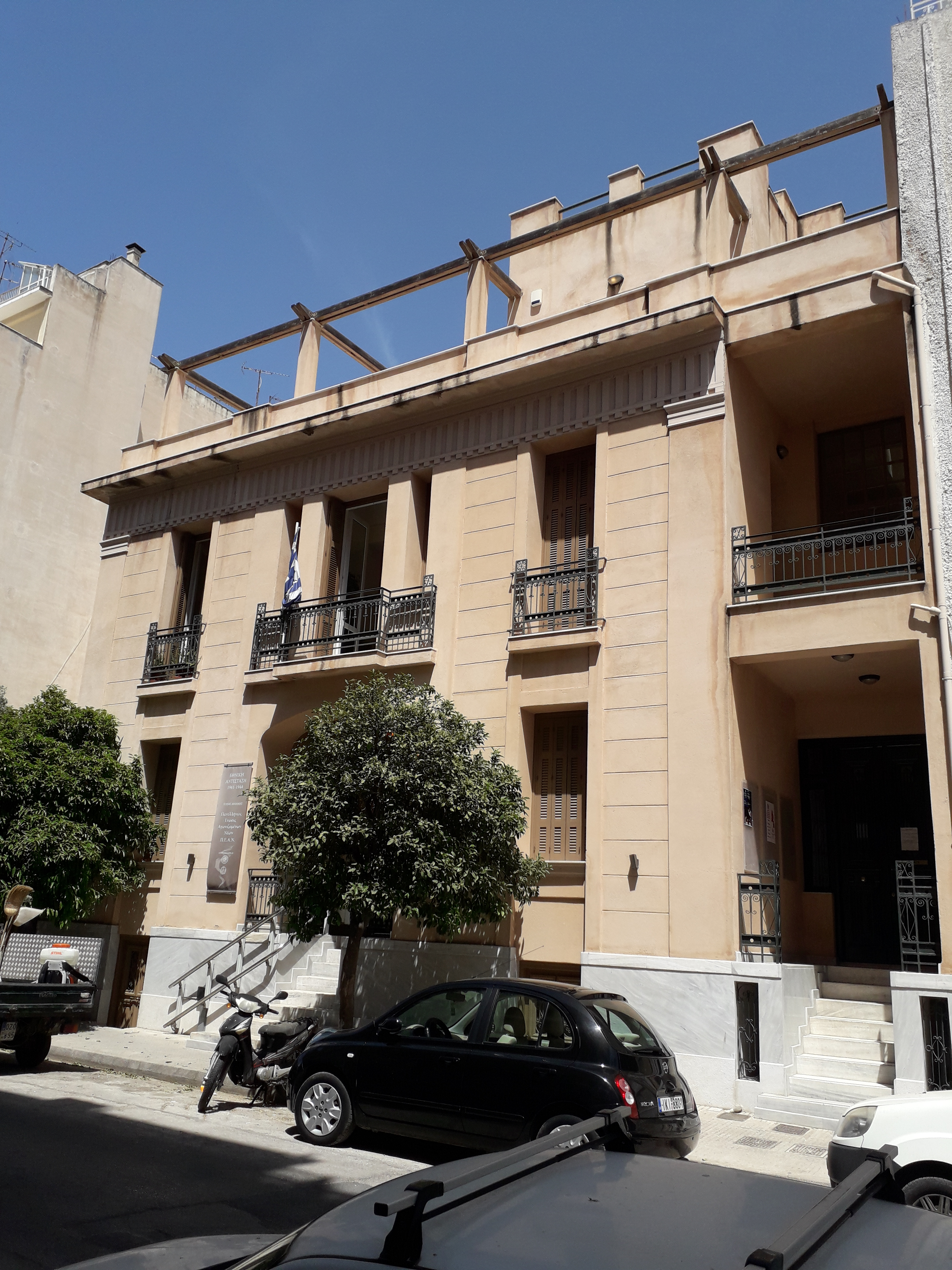
The PEAN Museum building in Kallithea, formerly used a hideout for the organisation

PEAN published a number of newspapers, most important of which was Doxa (Δόξα, "Glory"), first published in April 1942, and gained some popularity among the educated urban youth of Athens. Its most notable achievements, however, are the two bombings carried out by its "destruction squad" (members: Dionysios Papadopoulos, Thanasis Skouras, Antonis Mytilinaios, Spyros Galatis, Dimitrios Lois, Ioulia Bimba). In August 1942, they blew up the headquarters of the Greek pro-Nazi organization OEDE, without causing any casualties. On September 20, the group achieved a more spectacular and ultimately fatal success, when it blew up the headquarters of the National-Socialist Patriotic Organisation (ESPO), the largest Greek National-Socialist organization, in central Athens. ESPO was trying to recruit volunteers for a "Greek Legion" to fight in the Eastern Front alongside the Germans. A team of four (K. Perrikos, A. Mytilinaios, Sp. Galatis and I. Bimba), carried out the bombing, in which ca. 40 ESPO members and 6 Germans were wounded, most of them severely, including ESPO's founder, Dr. Spyros Sterodimas, who died shortly after of his wounds. The attack was widely publicized and praised by Allied radio stations, and marked the end of the ESPO and of German attempts to recruit Greeks into the Wehrmacht.

The Germans initially blamed EAM for the act, but after the betrayal of the group by gendarmerie officer Polykarpos Dalianis, on 11 November they managed to arrest PEAN's core group, including Perrikos, and on 31 December, a court martial condemned the arrested to death. Perrikos was executed at Kaisariani on February 4, Ioulia Bimba was executed by beheading on 26 February 1943 in Vienna, Galatis' sentence was commuted to a life sentence, while Mytilinaios managed to escape and flee to the Middle East. Four others, Th. Skouras, Ioannis Katevatis, D. Lois and D. Papadopoulos, although found not guilty, had been executed as a reprisal act on 7 January. Dalianis would soon be executed by fighters of the right-wing "Omiros" organisation, which members included later Junta officer Stylianos Pattakos.

=== Later history ===
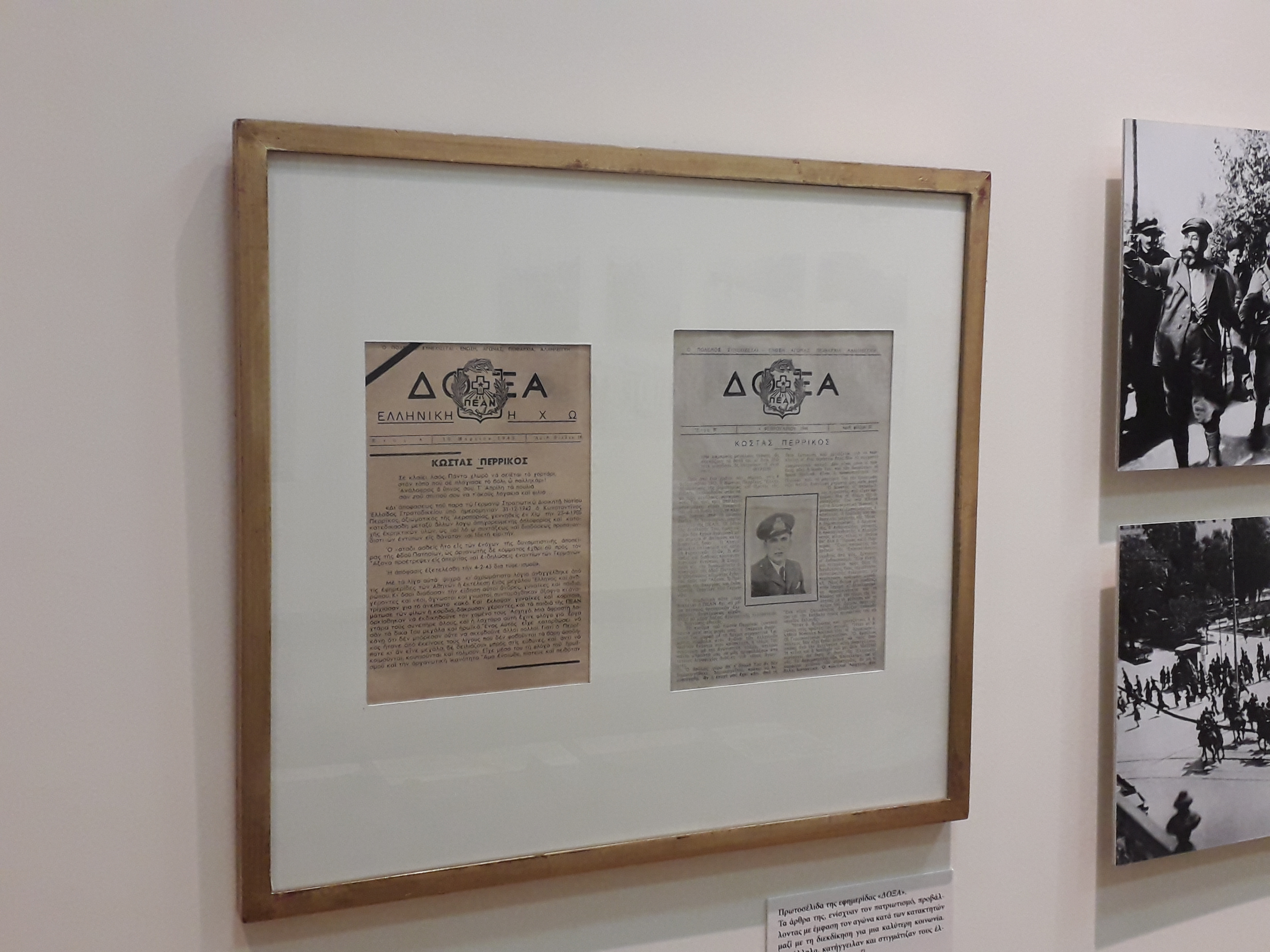
Two front pages of the Doxa newspaper

In September 1943, PEAN, the Athenian wing of EDES and the Sacred Brigade formed the People's Liberation Union (LAE) an alliance of Venizelist resistance organizations. The arrest of its leadership was a critical blow to the PEAN, which had never been very large, and severely limited its abilities. It did however carry on, in a purely political role, continuing to publish Doxa, and gradually moving to a more conservative stance, particularly through its rivalry with EAM. Its armed wing was reactivated only from March 1944 onwards, when it carried out a number of sabotage attacks on the Germans. During the December events of 1944, PEAN sided with the right-wing groups, the British and the government of George Papandreou against the forces of EAM-ELAS.

== Sources ==
- Hagen Fleischer (1995). Crown and Swastika - Greece of the Occupation and the Resistance, Vol. 2 (in Greek). Athens: Papazissis Ed. ISBN 960-02-1079-9.
- Kousouris, Dimitris (2015). Δίκες τών Δοσίλογων 1944-1949 [Trials of Collaborationists 1944-1949] (in Greek). Athens: Polis. ISBN 9789604354610.
- (in Greek) "Οι αντιστασιακές οργανώσεις φύτρωναν σαν μανιτάρια" article in the Eleftherotypia newspaper, 8.4.2006
- (in Greek) The bombing of the ESPO building from sansimera.gr
- (in Greek) The ESPO bombing from e-grammes.gr
