= Dekemvriana =

Greek Civil War clashes

- Part of World War II and the prelude to the Greek Civil War
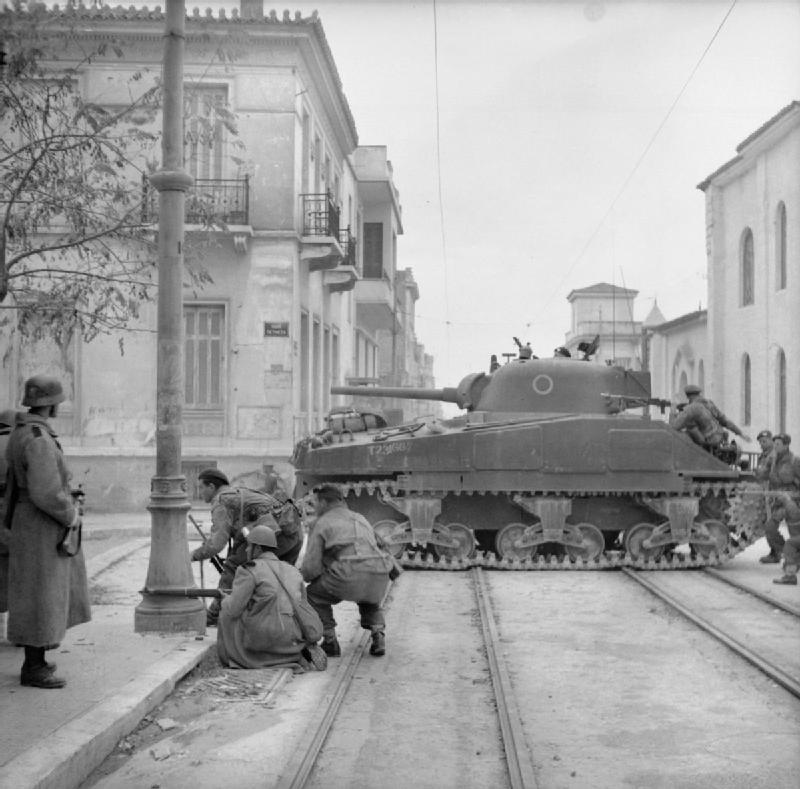
- A Sherman tank and troops from the 5th (Scottish) Parachute Battalion, British 2nd Parachute Brigade together with their Greek allies, fighting against members of ELAS in Athens, 18 December 1944.
Date	3 December 1944 – 11 January 1945 (1 month, 1 week and 1 day)
Location	Athens, Greece
Result	Kingdom of Greece victory: Treaty of Varkiza; Start of the Greek Civil War

Belligerents
Kingdom of Greece: Georgios Papandreou Government (1944); Nikolaos Plastiras Government (1945); 3rd Mountain Brigade; Sacred Band; Hellenic Gendarmerie; Cities Police; National Guard; (Kingdom of Greece) ΡΕΑΝ (Kingdom of Greece) RAN; Organization X Ex-members of the Security Battalions (Kingdom of Greece) EDES (in Epirus); United Kingdom: British Army	EAM: ELAS; National Civil Guard; OPLA; Students Band "Lord Byron"; other EAM's organizations

Commanders and leaders
(Kingdom of Greece) Archbishop Damaskinos (Kingdom of Greece) Georgios Papandreou (Kingdom of Greece) Nikolaos Plastiras (Kingdom of Greece) Thrasyvoulos Tsakalotos (Kingdom of Greece) Christodoulos Tsigantes (Kingdom of Greece) Angelos Evert; Georgios Grivas (Kingdom of Greece) Dionysios Papadongonas † (United Kingdom) Winston Churchill (United Kingdom) Ronald Scobie (United Kingdom) John Hawkesworth	Georgios Siantos; Manolis Mantakas; Giannis Zevgos; Grigoris Farakos; Stavros Mavrothalassitis; Konstantinos Laggouranis

Strength
(Kingdom of Greece) 11,600 (United Kingdom) 4,000–4,500 (since 12–16 December 1944) (United Kingdom) 80,000–90,000 (since 18 December 1944)	17,800

Casualties and losses
(Kingdom of Greece) 1,200 killed (United Kingdom) c. 210 killed 1,000 wounded 733 missing	c. 2,000 killed

The Dekemvriana (Greek: Δεκεμβριανά, lit. 'December events') was a series of clashes fought during World War II in Athens, Greece, from 3 December 1944 to 11 January 1945. The conflict was the culmination of months of tension between the left-wing EAM, some parts of its military arm, the ELAS, stationed in Athens, the KKE and the OPLA from one side and from the other side, the Greek Government, some parts of the Hellenic Royal Army, the Hellenic Gendarmerie, the Cities Police, the Organization X, among others and also the British Army.

Regardless of the tensions between the left and the right, in May 1944 it had been roughly agreed in the Lebanon Conference that all non-collaborationist factions would participate in a Government of National Unity; eventually, six out of 24 ministers were appointed by EAM. Additionally, a few weeks before the withdrawal of the German troops in October 1944, it had been reaffirmed in the Caserta Agreement that all collaborationist forces would be tried and punished accordingly; and that all resistance forces would participate in the formation of the new Hellenic Army under British command.

However, on 1 December, Lieutenant-General Ronald Scobie unilaterally ordered EAM-ELAS to disarm. The EAM ministers resigned on the following day, and EAM called for a rally in central Athens on 3 December, requesting the immediate punishment of the collaborationist Security Battalions and the withdrawal of the "Scobie Order". The rally of some 200,000 people was shot at by Cities Police and Hellenic Gendarmerie, leaving 28 protesters dead and 148 wounded. These killings precipitated a full-blown armed confrontation – at first between EAM and Greek security forces (which included the Security Battalions); then, during the second half of December, between EAM and British forces.

The clashes were limited to Athens, while elsewhere in Greece the situation remained tense but peaceful, with the exception of Epirus where Aris Velouchiotis attacked the forces of Napoleon Zervas. The Dekemvriana ended with the defeat of EAM-ELAS, leading to its disarmament in the Varkiza Agreement which marked the end of ELAS. This first defeat broke the power of EAM. This was followed by a period of "White Terror" against the Greek Left, which contributed to the outbreak of the Greek Civil War in 1946. The clashes of the Dekemvriana were among the bloodiest battles in modern Greek history, with a high rate of civilian deaths.

== Background ==
By 1944, the two major resistance movements in occupied Greece, EDES and EAM-ELAS, each saw the other as the main adversary. They both recognized the fact that it was only a matter of time before the Germans evacuated the country. For the communists, the British represented their major opponent.

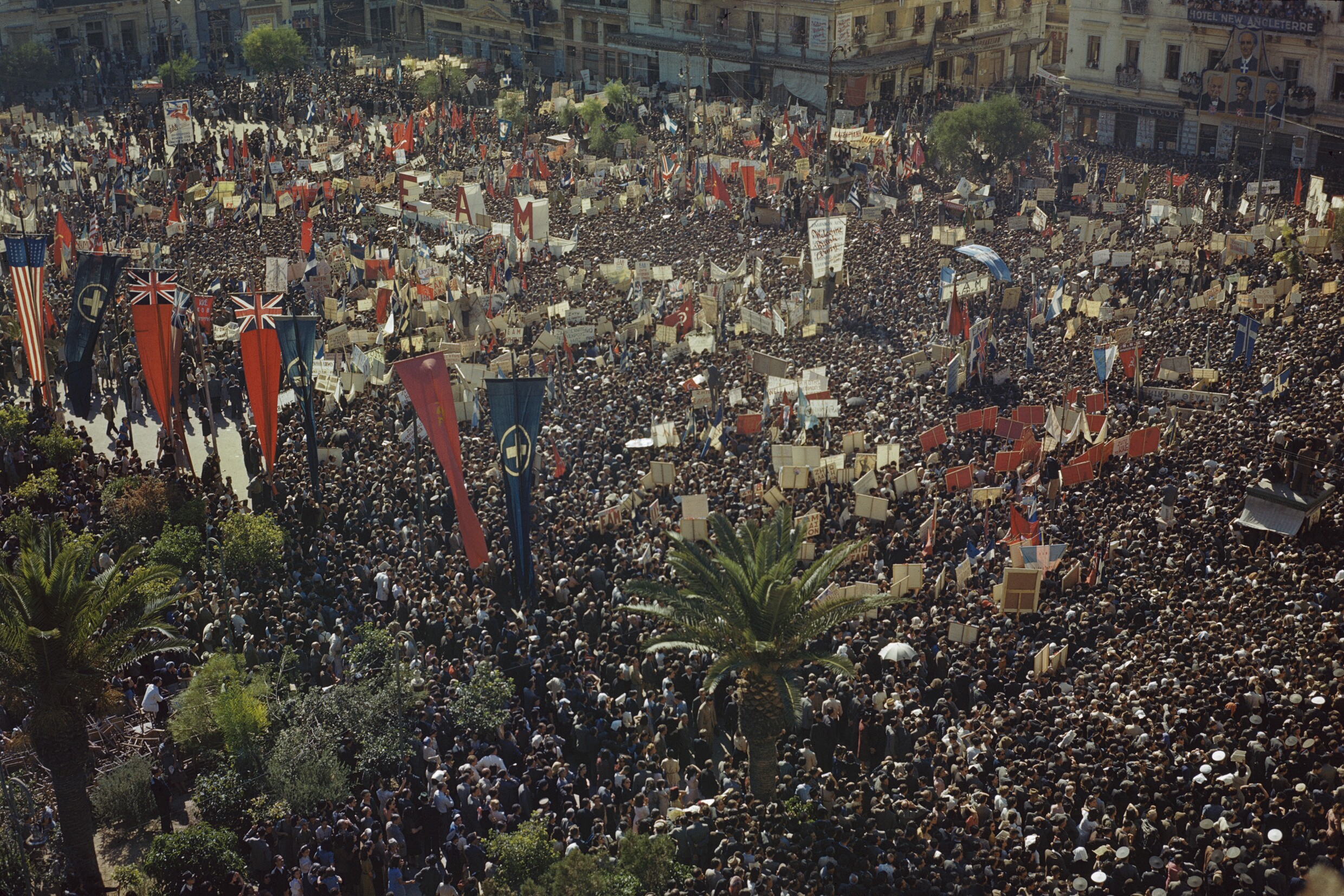
A crowd in Syntagma Square celebrate their liberation from Axis powers and the coming of the Papandreou Government (18 October 1944).

By the summer of 1944, the Soviet forces advancing into Romania and towards Yugoslavia meant that the Germans still in the Balkans were at risk of being cut off. In September, Marshal Fyodor Tolbukhin's armies advanced into Bulgaria, forcing the resignation of the country's pro-Nazi government and the establishment of a pro-Communist regime, and the withdrawal of Bulgarian troops from Greek Macedonia. The Axis withdrawal, before the exiled government could return to the country, created a power vacuum. The government-in-exile, now led by the prominent liberal George Papandreou, moved to Italy, in preparation for its return to Greece. Under the Caserta Agreement of September 1944, all resistance forces in Greece were to be placed under the command of British Lieutenant-General Ronald Scobie.

According to historian Donny Gluckstein, Scobie sought to delay the German withdrawal in order to prevent ELAS from establishing control of the country. He cites German plenipotentiary Hermann Neubacher for this claim.

The British arrived in Greece in October (Operation Manna) with the exiled Greek government and some units of the Greek army, led by Lieutenant General Thrasyvoulos Tsakalotos. By then, the Germans were in full retreat, and most of Greece's territory had already been liberated by Greek partisans. On 13 October, British troops entered Athens and Papandreou and his ministers followed six days later. King George II stayed in Cairo because Papandreou had promised that the future of the monarchy would be decided by referendum.

There was little to prevent ELAS from taking full control of the country. With the German withdrawal, ELAS units had taken control of the countryside and most of the cities. However, they did not take full control because the KKE leadership was instructed by the Soviet Union not to precipitate a crisis that could jeopardize Allied unity and put Stalin's larger postwar objectives at risk. Unlike their leaders, ELAS's fighters and rank-and-file were not aware of these instructions, and it became a source of conflict within both EAM and ELAS.

Following Stalin's instructions, the KKE leadership tried to avoid a confrontation with the Papandreou government. Most ELAS members saw the British as liberators with the exception of some KKE leaders, such as Andreas Tzimas and Aris Velouchiotis. Tzimas was in touch with Yugoslav Communist leader Josip Broz Tito, and he disagreed with ELAS's cooperation with the British forces.

The issue of disarming the resistance organizations was a cause of friction between the Papandreou government and its EAM members. Advised by British ambassador Reginald Leeper, Papandreou demanded the disarmament of all armed forces apart from the Sacred Band and the III Mountain Brigade, which were formed following the suppression of the 1944 Greek naval mutiny, and two equal numbered corps of ELAS and EDES that would take part in operations against the Germans (still occupying Crete), such as the constitution of a National Guard under government control.

EAM, believing that it would leave the guerrillas of ELAS defenseless against anticommunist militias, submitted an alternative plan of total and simultaneous disarmament. Papandreou rejected this plan, causing EAM's ministers to resign from the government on 2 December. On 1 December, Scobie had unilaterally issued a proclamation calling for the disarmament and dissolution of ELAS. Command of ELAS was the KKE's greatest source of strength, and the KKE leader Siantos decided that the demand for ELAS's dissolution must be resisted.

Tito's influence may have played some role in ELAS's resistance to disarmament. His influence, however, had not prevented the EAM leadership from putting its forces under Scobie's command a couple of months earlier, in accordance with the Caserta Agreement. Meanwhile, following Georgios Grivas's instructions, Organization X members had set up outposts in central Athens and resisted EAM for several days until British troops arrived, as their leader had been promised.

== The events ==
Unarmed EAM protesters lying dead or wounded on 3 December 1944 in front of the Greek Parliament, while others are running for their lives; moments after the first shootings that left at least 28 dead and signalled the beginning of the Dekemvriana events.

According to the Caserta Agreement, all Greek forces were under the Allied command of Scobie. On 1 December 1944, the Greek government of "National Unity" under Georgios Papandreou and Scobie (who was head of the Allied forces in Greece at that time) announced an ultimatum for the general disarmament of all guerrilla forces by 10 December, excluding those allied to the government (the 3rd Greek Mountain Brigade and the Sacred Band) and also a part of EDES and ELAS that would be used in Allied operations in Crete and the Dodecanese (still under German occupation), if it was necessary. As a result, on 2 December, six ministers of the EAM, most of whom were KKE members, resigned from their positions in the "National Unity" government. The EAM called for a general strike and a demonstration in front of the Greek parliament for the next day, 3 December.

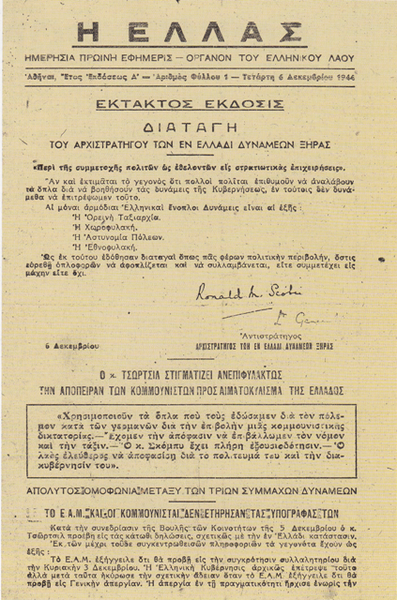
An order of Lt. General Scobie signed and printed in the government's newspaper "Η ΕΛΛΑΣ" (6 December), enforcing the government's ultimatum (1 December) for the immediate disarmament of all guerrilla forces not allied to the government.

The demonstration involved at least 200,000 people marching on Panepistimiou Street towards the Syntagma Square. British tanks along with Greek police units had been scattered around the area, blocking the way of the demonstrators. The shootings began when the marchers had arrived at the Tomb of the Unknown Soldier, in front of the Royal palace, above Syntagma Square. They originated from the streets, from the building of the General Police Headquarters, from the Parliament (Vouli), from the Hotel Grande Bretagne (where international observers had settled), from other governmental buildings and from policemen on the street. Among many testimonies, N. Farmakis, then a fifteen-year-old member of the anti-EAM Organization X participating in the shootings, described that he saw the head of the police Angelos Evert giving the order to open fire on the crowd, by means of a handkerchief waved from the window. The sharpshooters had been given a standing order, according to Farmakis, "Don't fire as they are marching, at least up to the Tomb of the Unknown Soldier. When they march to the Tomb of the Unknown Soldier, open fire!" Although there are no accounts hinting that the crowd indeed possessed guns, the British commander Woodhouse insisted that it was uncertain whether the first shots were fired by the police or the demonstrators. LIFE photographer Dmitri Kessel, who witnessed the shooting, reported that the "police fired without provocation". More than 28 demonstrators were killed, and 148 were injured. This signalled the beginning of the Dekemvriana (Greek: Δεκεμβριανά, "December events"), a 37-day period of full-scale fighting in Athens between EAM fighters and smaller parts of ELAS, and the forces of the British army and the government.

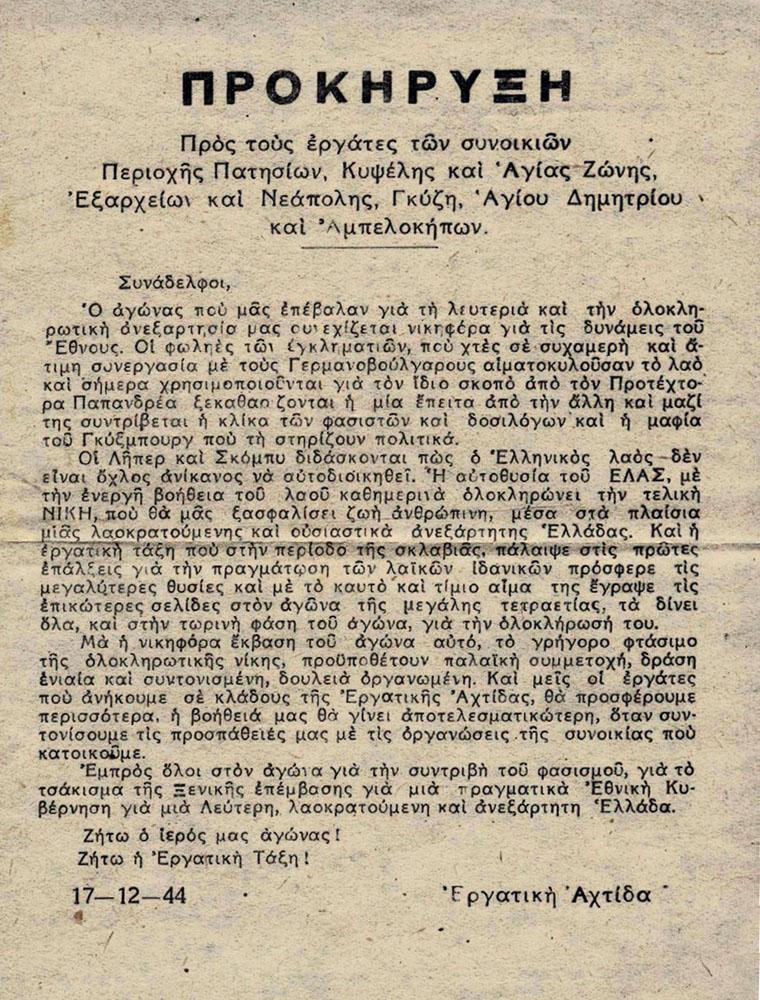
ELAS issued pamphlet calling workers from different neighbours of Athens to fight against the Greek Government and their British allies (17 December)

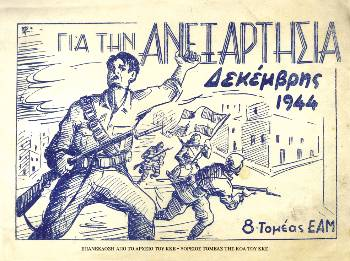
EAM-ELAS drawing about the battle

At the beginning the government had only a few policemen and gendarmes, some militia units, the 3rd Greek Mountain Brigade—distinguished at the Gothic Line offensive in Italy, which, however, lacked heavy weapons — and the royalist group Organization X, also known as "Chítes", which was accused by EAM of collaborating with the Nazis. Consequently, the British intervened in support of the Greek government, deploying artillery and aircraft to reinforce their position as the battle approached its last stages.

In the early morning hours of 4 December, ELAS reservists began operations in the Athens–Piraeus area, attacking Grivas' Organization X forces and many police stations with success. In the evening, a peaceful demonstration and funeral procession took place by EAM members. Government forces took no action but the procession was attacked by Chites led by Colonel Grivas, with over 100 dead. Also on 4 December, Papandreou gave his resignation to Scobie, who rejected it.

By 12 December, ΕΑΜ was in control of most of Athens, Piraeus and the suburbs. The government and British forces were confined only in the centre of Athens, in an area that was ironically called Scobia (Scobie's country) by the guerrillas. The British, alarmed by the initial successes of EAM-ELAS and outnumbered, flew in the 4th Indian Infantry Division from Italy as emergency reinforcements. They also transferred Lieutenant-general John Hawkesworth from Italy to Athens, as assistant to Scobie, who soon took the general command.

Although the British were openly fighting against EAM in Athens, there were no such battles in the rest of the big cities. In certain cases, such as Volos, some RAF units even surrendered equipment to ELAS fighters. It seems that ELAS preferred to avoid an armed confrontation with the British forces initially and later tried to reduce the conflict as much as possible, although poor communication between its many independent units around the country might also have played a role. This might explain the simultaneous skirmishes with the British, the large-scale ELAS operations against Trotskyists, anarchists and other political dissidents in Athens, and the many contradictory decisions of EAM leaders. Videlicet, the KKE leadership, was supporting a doctrine of "national unity" while eminent members, such as Leonidas Stringos, Theodoros Makridis, and even Georgios Siantos, were creating revolutionary plans. Even more curiously, Tito was both the KKE's key sponsor and a key British ally, owing his physical and political survival in 1944 to British assistance.

== Churchill in Athens ==
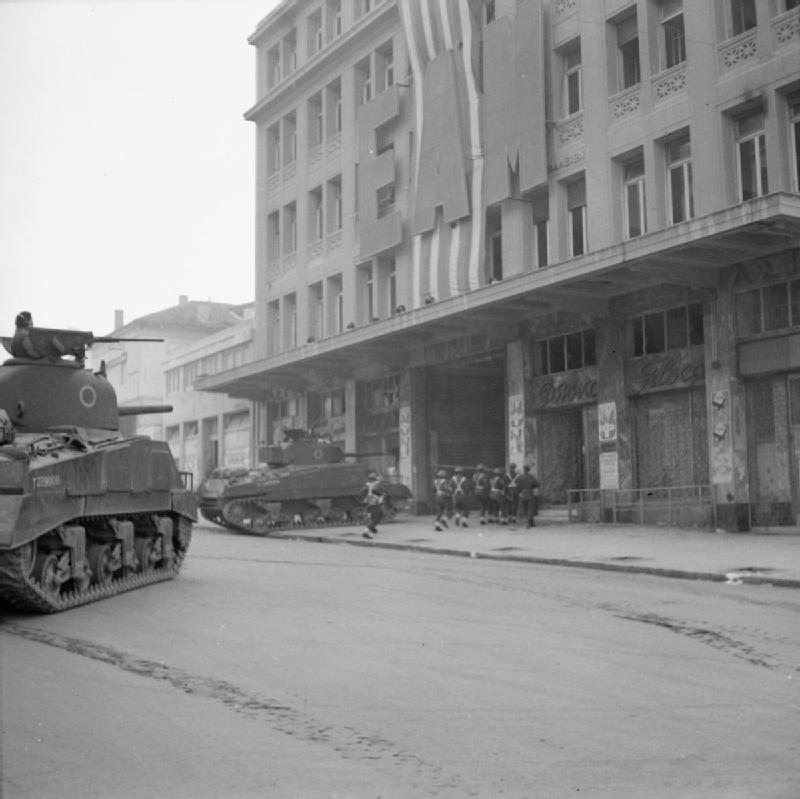
British tanks and soldiers outside a building of EAM

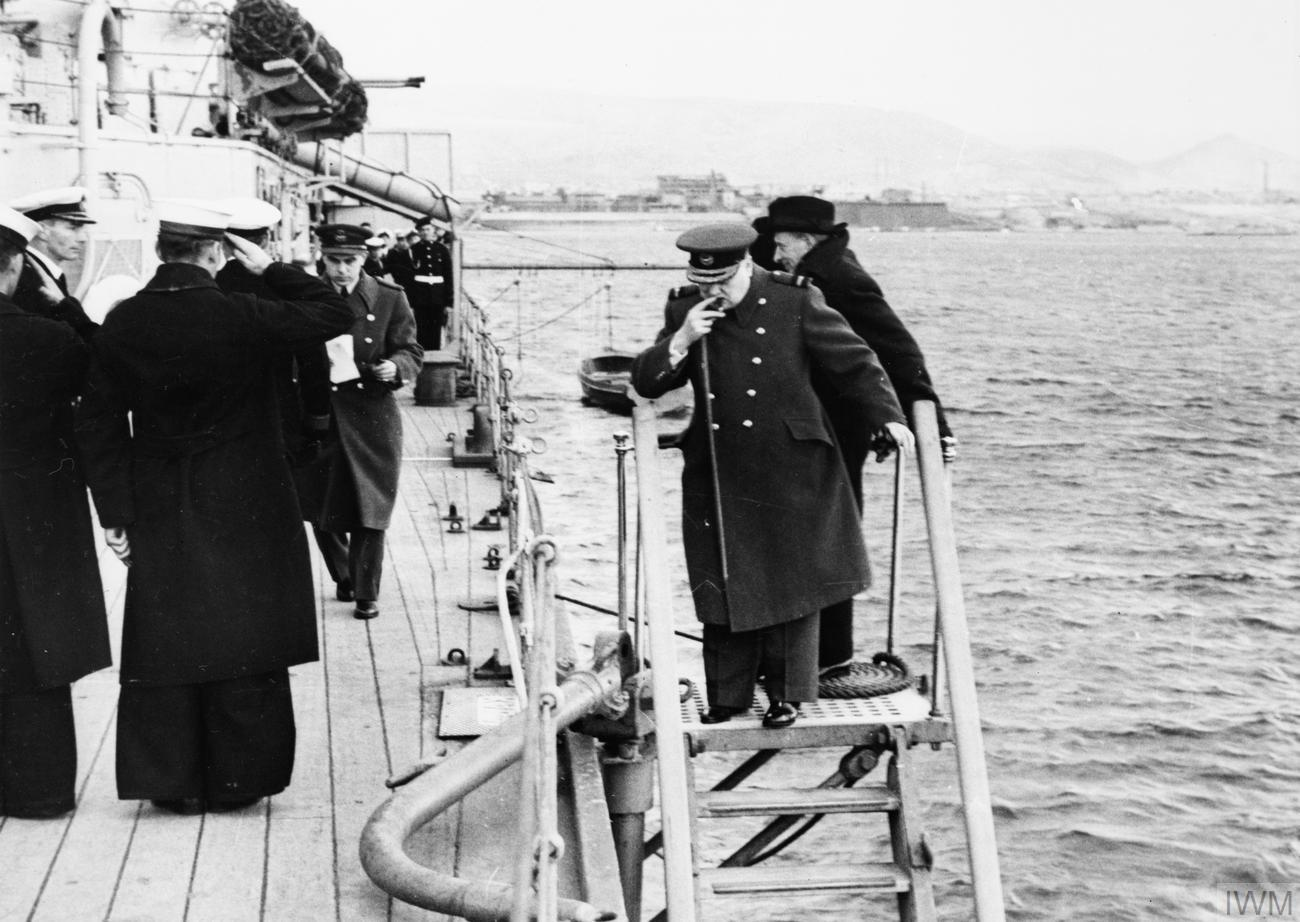
Churchill in Athens, December 1944

This outbreak of fighting between Allied forces and an anti-German European resistance movement while the war in Europe was still being fought was a serious political problem for Churchill's coalition government in Britain and caused much protest in the British press and the House of Commons. To prove his peacemaking intentions to the public, Churchill went to Athens with Field Marshal Harold Alexander, Anthony Eden and Harold Macmillan on Christmas Day (25 December), to preside over a conference to bring about a settlement, in which Soviet representatives (Popov) also participated.

The conference was to take place in the Hotel Grande Bretagne. Later, it became known that there was a plan by the EAM to blow up the building, aiming to kill the participants, which was finally cancelled. Instead the conference took place in Phaliro, on the cruiser Ajax. From the Greek side Siantos, Partsalidis, Mantakas and Sofianopoulos took part for EAM and Regent Damaskinos, Papandreou, Panagiotis Kanellopoulos, Sofoulis, Kafantaris, Dimitris Maximos, Stefanos Stefanopoulos, Gonatas, Tsaldaris and as a special personality Nikolaos Plastiras for the government. It failed because the EAM-ELAS demands were considered excessive.

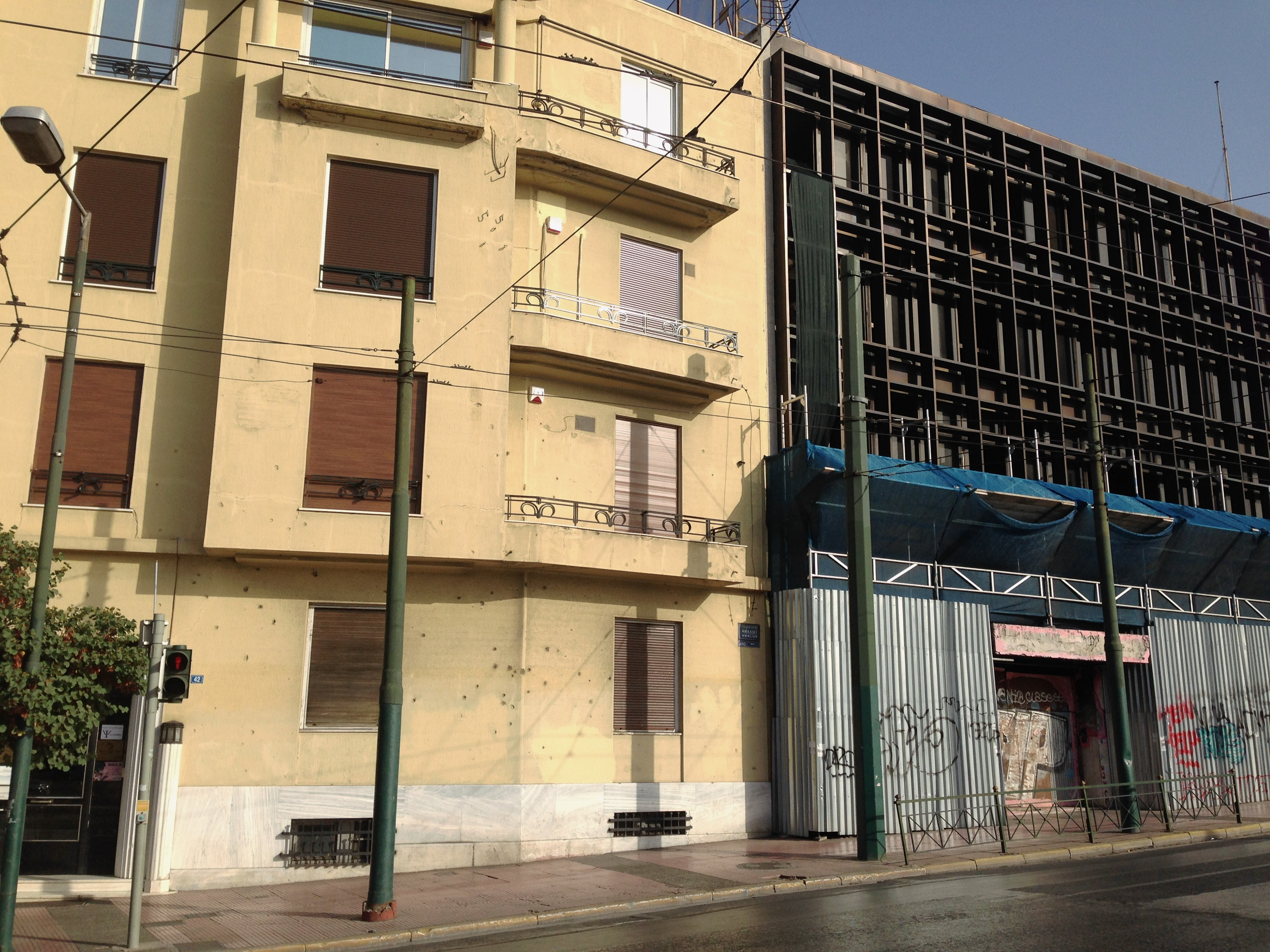
Building with bullet holes from Dekemvriana in Athens (2014)

Meanwhile, the Soviet Union remained passive about developments in Greece. True to the informal Percentages agreement struck between Stalin and Churchill that placed Greece in the British sphere of influence, the Soviet delegation in Greece did not encourage or discourage the EAM's ambitions. The delegation's chief gained the nickname "sphinx" among local Communist officers for not giving any clues about Soviet intentions. Pravda did not mention the clashes at all. By early January, EAM forces had lost the battle. Despite Churchill's intervention, Papandreou resigned and was replaced by Lieutenant General Nikolaos Plastiras. On 15 January 1945, Scobie agreed to a ceasefire in exchange for the ELAS's withdrawal from its positions at Patras and Thessaloniki and its demobilization in the Peloponnese.

== Aftermath ==
During the Dekemvriana fighting in Athens, Franklin D. Roosevelt issued a statement disapproving of fighting between the British and EAM, and in private was reportedly appalled by what was happening in Greece. According to his son Elliott, Roosevelt privately stated "How the British can dare such a thing!... Killing Greek guerrillas! Using British soldiers for such a job! Likewise, American media coverage of the Dekemvriana was overwhelmingly hostile towards the British with American journalists criticizing Churchill for recruiting the Security Battalions to fight for the unpopular King George against the EAM. In response to American claims that Britain was exercising "power politics" in Greece, Churchill snapped back in a speech: "What are power politics?...Is having a Navy twice as big as any other Navy in the world power politics? Is having the largest Air Force in the world, with bases in every part of the world power politics? Is having all the gold in the world power politics? If so, we are certainly not guilty of these offences, I am sorry to say. They are luxuries that have passed away from us."

The communist guerrillas, led by Siantos, evacuated the capital taking thousands of hostages. During their retreat to central Greece, many of them died from the cold or hardships. ELAS took hostages in order to dissuade the RAF from attacking it during its retreat. About 13,000 members of EAM-ELAS were also arrested by British forces and handed over to the Greek authorities. The new government of Plastiras and the Communist Party signed in February 1945 the Treaty of Varkiza in an effort of accord.

On 25 January 1945, a mass grave of about 200 people was found in Athens. Examiners estimated the bodies to be a month to six weeks old, which aligns with the period of the ELAS occupation of the area. None of the 200 were executed via gunshot, instead having been executed with hatchets, blunt instruments, or by stoning.

== People ==
Participants with the EAM-ELAS side included among others Kostas Axelos, Iannis Xenakis, Manolis Glezos, Apostolos Santas, Mikis Theodorakis, Memos Makris, Aimilios Veakis, Dimitris Partsalidis, Helene Ahrweiler and Nikos Koundouros. Participants with the government/British side included Anastasios Peponis, Stylianos Pattakos, Konstantinos Ventiris and Panagiotis Spiliotopoulos.
