= The Big Smoke (publication) =

Australian opinion site, also with an American version

- Owner: Sentral Media Group
- Website: thebigsmoke.com
- Launched: November 2013

The Big Smoke (TBS) is an online publication and opinion site published and run by The Sentral Media Group. It featured both established and emerging writers. It published original opinion articles on news, politics, the arts, lifestyle, law, social issues, satire and business. It was founded in 2013 in Australia, with a United States version launched in 2015.

Its founder and CEO is entrepreneur, social commentator and business columnist Alexandra Senter.

The Big Smoke Media Group entered into liquidation on 10 June 2026.

== Notable contributors ==
TBS features both established and emerging writers.

- Anthony Albanese, Australian politician, elected Prime Minister of Australia in 2022
- Franca Arena, Australian politician and activist
- Maggie Beer, Australian cook
- Bob Brown, former politician and environmental activist
- Julian Burnside, barrister and activist
- Paul Capsis, actor and musician
- Jane Caro, social commentator, writer and lecturer
- Nicholas Cowdery, barrister
- Alex Greenwich, Australian politician and LGBT activist
- Derryn Hinch, media personality
- Gretel Killeen, comedian and television personality
- John Mangos, news presenter
- Clover Moore, Lord Mayor of the City of Sydney
- Lee Rhiannon, Australian politician
- Henry Rollins, American musician
