= Alexandra Senter =

Alexandra Senter is an Australian entrepreneur, social commentator and business columnist. She is the founder and CEO of opinion site The Big Smoke and the Sentral Media Group. Senter was noted in Business Insider for her entrepreneurship in Australia.

== Career ==
In June 2026, The Big Smoke Media Pty Ltd (ACN 162 451 621) owned by Alexandra Senter, the company associated with The Big Smoke, entered liquidation. Initial records estimated liabilities of approximately A$4.15 million and listed employees and the Australian Taxation Office among its creditors. Senter attributed the closure largely to artificial-intelligence disruption in the marketing industry and said that Sentral Media Group, a separate company, had rehired some former staff while providing different services. A September statutory report subsequently estimated liabilities of A$5,110,851. The liquidator’s preliminary assessment indicated that the company may have been insolvent as early as June 2022 and may have incurred approximately A$1.48 million in additional liabilities afterward. Further investigation was needed to establish an insolvency date or quantify any resulting claim.

The September report recorded A$170,577.56 in estimated priority claims comprising A$45,879.87 in wages, A$3,076 in leave and A$121,621.69 in superannuation guarantee charge. Separately, eight former employees had lodged proofs of debt totalling A$148,185.72; not every former employee had lodged a claim. Senter told Mumbrella that outstanding employee entitlements had been paid and later told The Courier-Mail that she had personally covered them. The liquidator’s report did not verify that all entitlements had been settled: it said payments Senter reported making personally were still being checked against payroll records, bank statements and employee claims.

The Australian Taxation Office had issued Senter a Director Penalty Notice concerning the company’s unpaid superannuation guarantee charge. The liquidator reported that she paid A$193,447.47 under that notice on 14 August 2026. As of 10 September, A$71,825.78 had been applied to the company’s superannuation guarantee charge account, while A$121,621.69 remained recorded as residual superannuation guarantee charge during the reconciliation. The ATO had also advised that additional superannuation periods might remain unassessed. Payment under the notice was distinct from verification that every employee’s wages, superannuation and leave had been settled.

The liquidator also identified A$559,368 in payments to the director and related parties during the four years before liquidation, and A$219,234 in transactions described as loan repayments, reimbursements or similar payments for which no commercial rationale was apparent from the information then available. Investigations were ongoing; the report did not establish whether the two categories overlapped, so they should not be added together. Senter’s statement of company affairs recorded asserted debts of A$1,357,916 to her and A$750,000 to her spouse, Marc Senter. The liquidator said neither loan claim had been verified. At the time of the September report, the liquidator had not identified creditor-defeating dispositions or indicators of illegal phoenix activity.

Senter appears regularly on ABC TV including ABC's The Drum.

She is also the cofounder and Director of Jewish think tank The Jewish Independent (formerly Plus61J).

Senter writes a business column in CEO magazine and appears regularly as a commentator on nationwide radio in Australia, including 2GB, 2UE and ABC. She has been published in The Huffington Post, The Australian, The Age, The Sydney Morning Herald, News.com.au, The Daily Mail UK, Australian Financial Review, Business Insider, BRW, and Management Today.

== Personal life and education ==
In 2016, Alexandra Senter hired 82-year old Advertising executive Roger Pugh to lead a team of millennial staff.

Senter also has a Masters of Business Management.
