= First Army (Greece) =

1st Army
- 1η Στρατιά "ΑΧΙΛΛΕΑΣ"
- Camp flag of the 1st Army
- Active: 1947–2026
- Country: Greece
- Branch: Hellenic Army
- Type: Mechanised Infantry
- Size: Field Army
- Part of: Hellenic Army General Staff
- Garrison/HQ: Larissa
- Mottos: As long as [the sun] follows his course ΕΣΤ' ΑΝ ΤΗΝ ΑΥΤΗΝ ΟΔΟΝ ΙΗ; Est' an tin aftin odon ii
- Engagements: Greek Civil War

Commanders
- Notable commanders: Dimitrios Giatzis; Konstantinos Ventiris; Phaedon Gizikis; Agamemnon Gratzios; Christos Manolas; Konstantinos Floros

The Greek First Army (Greek: 1η Στρατιά, Proti Stratia), was the highest formation of the Hellenic Army and its only extant field army.

Various English and German-language sources erroneously mention the existence of a First Army during the Greco-Italian War and the Battle of Greece (1940–41). The Greek Army did not employ an army-level command in this period. Leo Niehorster's website shows the higher organisation of the Greek Army on 15 August 1940, with the General Staff of the Army directly supervising five corps, three divisions, and the Thessaloniki Fortress.

The First Army was created in March 1947, during the Greek Civil War. It controlled the II and III Corps, with Volos as its headquarters. It was abolished on 10 February 1948, and re-established in 1951 with its HQ at Larissa, where it remained till its disestablishment. Its CO was always a lieutenant general.

== Structure ==
- First Army (1η Στρατιά), based at Larissa, Thessaly which includes
  - IV Army Corps (Δ' Σώμα Στρατού - Δ' ΣΣ), based in Xanthi, Thrace
  - I Infantry Division (I ΜΠ), based in Veroia, Macedonia
  - II Mechanised Infantry Division (II Μ/Κ ΜΠ), based in Edessa, Macedonia

== Emblem and Motto ==
The emblem of the 1st Army was an Ancient Macedonian shield, emblazoned with the sun of Vergina. It symbolizes determination, strength and the will of the First Army.

The motto is "As long as (the sun) follows his course" (Greek: εστ' αν (ο ήλιος) την αυτήν οδόν ίη, est' an (o ilios) tin aftin odon ii). Before the Battle of Plataea, Mardonius offered the Athenians peace terms, with the hope of dividing the Greek forces. The Athenians responded with "As long as the sun follows his course, as he does now, we shall not come to a compromise with Xerxes".

== Sources ==
- Η ιστορία της οργάνωσης του Ελληνικού Στρατού, 1821–1954 [The history of the organization of the Hellenic Army, 1821–1954] (in Greek). Hellenic Army Historical Directorate. 2005. p. 419. ISBN 960-7897-45-5.
