= Omiros (resistance group) =

Greek WW2 resistance organization

Omiros (Greek: Όμηρος, "Homer") was a resistance organization in German-occupied Greece during World War II. It was established in September 1941 on the initiative of Panagiotis Kanellopoulos. It worked closely with the British military and intelligence. The majority of its members were Greek Army officers, but many civilians were also involved.

Omiros was involved in intelligence-gathering, sabotage, publication of an illegal resistance newspaper (Μαχόμενη Ελλάς, Machomeni Hellas, "Fighting Hellas") and organizing the escape of Greek and British officers to the Middle East; it also created a youth section, the Sacred Brigade (Ιερά Ταξιαρχία). The organization's sabotage group, Unit 309 successfully destroyed Luftwaffe aircraft stationed in Hasani airfield and caused damage to Axis ships anchored in the port of Piraeus, among other actions.

Although Omiros was relatively small in size, it had in its ranks many people who went on to play a leading role in Greek politics in the post-war decades. Among its members were Konstantinos Dovas (future general and Chief of the Defence Staff), Menios Koutsogiorgas (Deputy Prime Minister of Greece) and Stylianos Pattakos (a leading member of the Regime of the Colonels).

== Sources ==
- Eleftherotypia newspaper: Istorika insert, "National Resistance", 22 November 2001
- Grigoriadis, Solon (1982). Συνοπτική Ιστορία της Εθνικής Αντίστασης, 1941-1944 [Concise History of the National Resistance, 1941-1944] (in Greek). Athens: Kapopoulos. OCLC 165816421.
