= Aristos Kasmiroglou =

Greek jurist

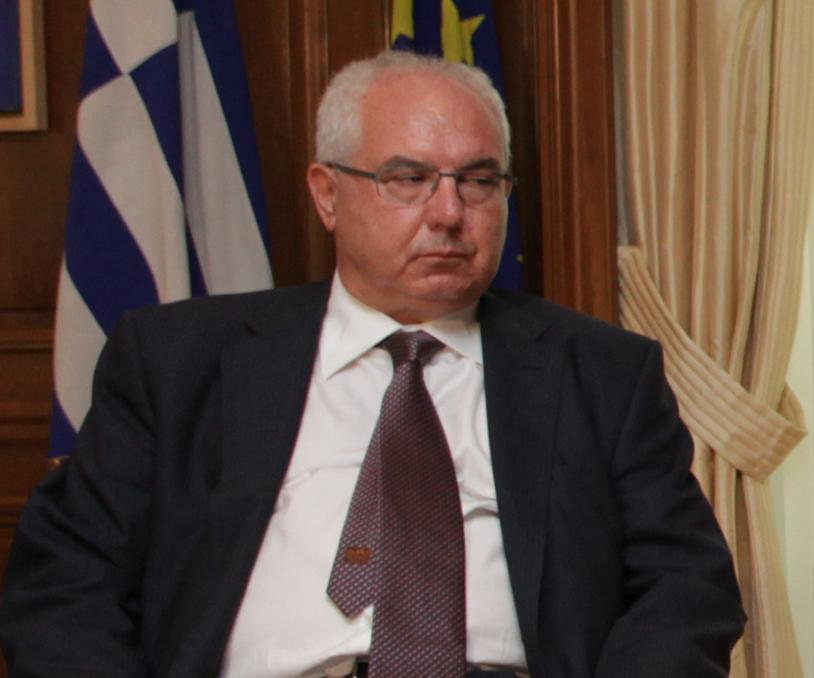
Aristos Kasmiroglou, former civil administrator of the monastic community of Mount Athos.

Aristos Kasmiroglou (Greek: Αρίστος Κασμίρογλου) is a Greek jurist and the former Civil Administrator of Mount Athos, the appointed civil head of government of the monastic community of Mount Athos, from 2001 to 2004 and again from 2010 until 2018.

== Biography ==
Aristos Kasmiroglou was born in Athens, from parents who migrated from Asia Minor to Greece. He is a graduate of the National and Kapodistrian University of Athens. He is a retired Director of the Water Supply and Sewerage Company (EYDAP) and member of the Friends of Mount Athos association.

In 1996, he assumed the duties of deputy civil governor of the autonomous Monastic State of Mount Athos.

From 1999 to 2004, he served as director of the radio station of the Church of Greece. At the same time participated in the Synodal Commission of Press, Public Relations and Enlightenment of the Church of Greece.

On 29 April 2010, Aristos Kasmiroglou was promoted to civil governor of the autonomous Monastic State of Mount Athos.
