= National Socialist Patriotic Organisation =

National Socialist Patriotic Organisation Εθνική Σοσιαλιστική Πατριωτική Οργάνωσις
- Founder: Georgios Vlavianos, Spyros Sterodimas
- Founded: 1941
- Dissolved: 1942
- Ideology: Nazism; Antisemitism; Anti-capitalism; Anti-communism
- Political position: Far-right

The ESPO (Greek: Εθνική Σοσιαλιστική Πατριωτική Οργάνωσις, lit. 'National Socialist Patriotic Organization', ΕΣΠΟ), also mentioned as Greek Socialist Patriotic Organisation, was a collaborationist, pro-Nazi organization created in the summer of 1941 in German-occupied Greece, under the leadership of Georgios Vlavianos and later Spyros Sterodimas. Its leading members belonged to the middle bourgeoisie and the military ranks, while its ordinary members belonged to the working class and some to the underworld.

== The bombing ==
Sterodimas, meanwhile, was trying to recruit Greek youth to create a Greek division of the Waffen SS, but was killed together with other 28 members of ESPO (and 48 German soldiers) when the PEAN resistance group blew up the organization's headquarters in central Athens. His death meant the abandonment of these plans and the effective end of ESPO. After the death of Sterodimas, the leadership passed to Aristeides Andronikos, who left for Austria in September 1944 with other collaborators.
