= Hellenic Army General Staff =

- Γενικό Επιτελείο Στρατού
- Flag of the Hellenic Army General Staff
- Founded: 1904
- Country: Greece
- Branch: Hellenic Army
- Type: Staff
- Part of: Hellenic National Defence General Staff
- Garrison/HQ: Athens
- Motto(s): Ἐλεύθερον τὸ Εὔψυχον "Freedom Stems from Valour"
- Website: http://www.army.gr/

Commanders
- Chief: Lt. Gen. George Kostidis
- Inspector-General of the Army: Lt. Gen. Spyridon Alfantakis

The Hellenic Army General Staff (Greek: Γενικό Επιτελείο Στρατού, abbrev. ΓΕΣ) is the general staff of the Hellenic Army, the terrestrial component of the Greek Armed Forces. It was established in 1904. Since 1950, the HAGS is subordinated to the Hellenic National Defence General Staff. The Chief of the HAGS (Αρχηγός ΓΕΣ, Α/ΓΕΣ) is the head of the Hellenic Army.

== History ==
Although the first regular army units were raised as early as 1821–1822, on the outbreak of the Greek War of Independence, the first rudimentary general staff organization, in the form of the General Staff Officers Corps (Σώμα Γενικών Επιτελών), was created only in 1833, after the establishment of the independent Kingdom of Greece. The first attempt to create a permanent staff service was made in 1877, when the Army General Staff was first instituted. The experiment was short-lived, however, as it and the General Staff Officers Corps were abolished in 1880, and replaced by a simple Staff Service Bureau within the Ministry of Military Affairs.

The modern Army General Staff traces its origin to 1900, when the Staff of the Army General Command was established as a staff for the Army General Commander, Crown Prince Constantine. In 1904, it was reconstituted as the General Staff of the Army General Command (Γενικό Επιτελείο της Γενικής Διοίκησης Στρατού), with greatly expanded authority over the organization, training and equipment of the Army. The General Staff Officers Corps was also reconstituted, while the Ministry's role was reduced. In 1909, following the Goudi coup, these changes were reversed again as the privileged position of the staff officers around Constantine was resented. Instead, the Army Staff Service was established, which retained its name until 1923, when it was finally renamed as the Army General Staff. In the period November 1917 to November 1920, the service was headed by French officers with a Greek deputy.

In 1936, the Army General Staff was reorganized. In 1940–1941, during the Greco-Italian War and the subsequent German invasion of Greece, the Army General Staff served as the nucleus over the General Headquarters under the former Chief of the Army General Staff, Lt. General Alexander Papagos. Following the occupation of Greece by the Axis powers, the Greek armed forces were reconstituted in the Middle East by the Greek government in exile, along with a rudimentary Army General Staff.

In December 1945, after Liberation, and again in 1948 and 1950, when the unified Ministry of National Defence was founded, the Army General Staff was reorganized. On 18 December 1968 the then-ruling military junta reorganized the Greek armed forces' command into a unified Armed Forces Headquarters. The Army General Staff was renamed as the Army Headquarters (Αρχηγείο Στρατού). This structure remained in force until 1 August 1977, when the previous structure was restored.

== Structure ==
The Hellenic Army General Staff comprises its Commanding Officer (the Chief), the Staff proper, the Special Staff (comprising the directorates of the arms and corps) and the Army General Staff Battalion which comprises the conscript soldiers serving within it. The Staff proper comprises a number of directorates, grouped into four main branches (κλάδοι):

- 1st Branch (Α' Κλάδος), comprising the Operations, Intelligence-Security, Exercises, and Mobilization Directorates, and the NATO secretariat
- 2nd Branch (Β' Κλάδος), comprising various personnel-related directorates, plus the religious affairs and music departments
- 3rd Branch (Γ' Κλάδος), dealing with logistical support
- 4th Branch (Δ' Κλάδος):, comprising organization, training and doctrine directorates

Along with the various combat arms and auxiliary corps directorates, these are further grouped under the two Deputy Chiefs of Staff. The First Deputy Chief heads the 1st and 4th branches along with the main combat arms (infantry, armour, artillery, special forces, etc.), while the Second Deputy Chief heads the 2nd and 3rd branches and the support corps (transport, medical services, supply, etc.). In addition, the Inspectorate General of the Army (Γενική Επιθεώρηση Στρατού, ΓΕΠΣ) is a separate department with overarching authority.

The current leadership of the Hellenic Army General Staff is:

- Chief of the Hellenic Army General Staff (Αρχηγός ΓΕΣ): Lieutenant General George Kostidis
- Army Inspector General, Doctrine and Training Commander (Γενικός Επιθεωρητής Στρατού): Lieutenant General Spyridon Alfantakis
- Commanding General, Higher Army Support Military Command: Dimitrios Bolomitis

== Emblem ==
The emblem of the Hellenic Army General Staff was adopted in 1947, and features a black double-headed eagle, a traditional Byzantine symbol, on a yellow background. On its breast lies a simplified version of the coat of arms of Greece, and above it the shield carries the legend ΕΛΕΥΘΕΡΟΝ ΤΟ ΕΥΨΥΧΟΝ ("freedom stems from valour"), a quote from Pericles' Funeral Oration: "These take as your model and, judging happiness to be the fruit of freedom and freedom of valour, never decline the dangers of war." (Thucydides, History of the Peloponnesian War, II.43).
