= List of World War II battles =

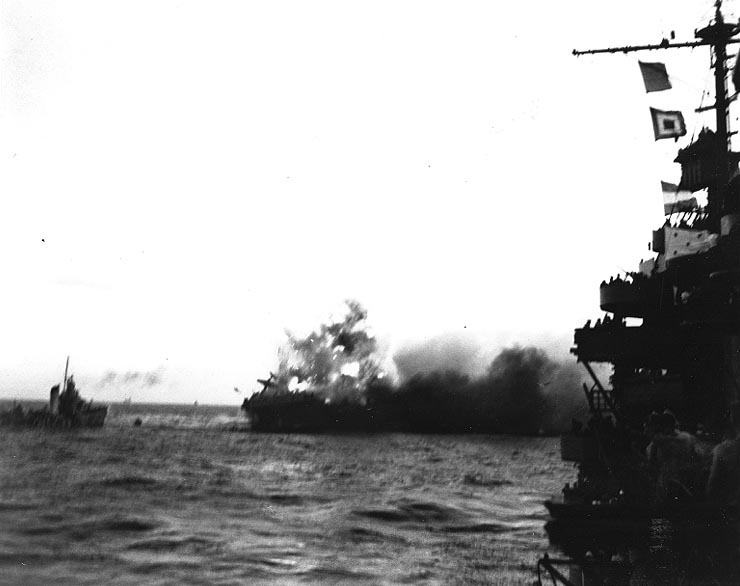
USS Lexington explodes during the Battle of the Coral Sea.

This is a list of World War II battles encompassing land, naval, and air engagements as well as campaigns, military operations, and sieges. Campaigns generally refer to broader strategic operations conducted over a large area of territory and over a long period. Battles generally refer to short periods of intense combat localised to a specific area and over a specific period. However, use of the terms in naming such events is not consistent. For example, the Battle of the Atlantic was more or less an entire theatre of war, and the so-called battle lasted for the duration of the entire war.

== Battles in 1939 ==
Allied or Finnish (Note: The Finnish are grouped in with the Allies in 1939 and 1940 despite not being a member of the Allied powers due to limited backing of Finland by the Allies.) victory
Axis/Soviet (Note: The Soviet Union is grouped in with the Axis powers in 1939 and 1940 despite not being a member of the Axis powers as they fought against Poland, which was a member of the Allies, and Finland, which received backing from the Allies.) Victory
Another result (e.g. stalemate, inconclusive, disputed)

Battle	Campaign	Theatre	Start	End	Allies	Axis	Victory
Westerplatte	Invasion of Poland		1939-09-01	1939-09-07	Poland	Germany; Danzig	Axis
Chojnice	Invasion of Poland		1939-09-01		Poland	Germany	Axis
Danzig	Invasion of Poland		1939-09-01		Poland	Danzig	Axis
Danzig Bay	Invasion of Poland		1939-09-01		Poland	Germany	Axis
Krojanty	Invasion of Poland		1939-09-01		Poland	Germany	Axis
Lasy Królewskie	Invasion of Poland		1939-09-01		Poland	Germany	Allies
Mokra	Invasion of Poland		1939-09-01		Poland	Germany	Allies
Mikołów	Invasion of Poland		1939-09-01	1939-09-02	Poland	Germany	Axis
Pszczyna	Invasion of Poland		1939-09-01	1939-09-02	Poland	Germany	Axis
Częstochowa	Invasion of Poland		1939-09-01	1939-09-03	Poland	Germany	Axis
Mława	Invasion of Poland		1939-09-01	1939-09-03	Poland	Germany	Axis
Jordanów	Invasion of Poland		1939-09-01	1939-09-03	Poland	Germany	Axis
Węgierska Górka	Invasion of Poland		1939-09-01	1939-09-03	Poland	Germany	Axis
Grudziądz	Invasion of Poland		1939-09-01	1939-09-04	Poland	Germany	Axis
Tuchola Forest	Invasion of Poland		1939-09-01	1939-09-05	Poland	Germany	Axis
Slovak invasion of Poland	Invasion of Poland		1939-09-01	1939-09-16	Poland	Slovakia	Axis
Hel	Invasion of Poland		1939-09-01	1939-10-02	Poland	Germany	Axis
Fraustadt	Invasion of Poland		1939-09-02		Poland	Germany	Allies
Borowa Góra	Invasion of Poland		1939-09-02	1939-09-06	Poland	Germany	Axis
Bukowiec	Invasion of Poland		1939-09-03		Poland	Germany	Axis
Katowice	Invasion of Poland		1939-09-03	1939-09-04	Poland	Germany	Axis
Piotrków Trybunalski	Invasion of Poland		1939-09-04	1939-09-06	Poland	Germany	Axis
Różan	Invasion of Poland		1939-09-04	1939-09-06	Poland	Germany	Axis
Tomaszów Mazowiecki	Invasion of Poland		1939-09-06		Poland	Germany	Axis
Pułtusk	Invasion of Poland		1939-09-06	1939-09-07	Poland	Germany	Axis
Łódź	Invasion of Poland		1939-09-06	1939-09-08	Poland	Germany	Axis
Barak	Invasion of Poland		1939-09-07	1939-09-08	Poland	Germany	Allies
Łomża	Invasion of Poland		1939-09-07	1939-09-10	Poland	Germany	Axis
Wizna	Invasion of Poland		1939-09-07	1939-09-10	Poland	Germany	Axis
Saar Offensive	Phoney War	Western Front	1939-09-07	1939-10-16	France	Germany	Axis
Wola Cyrusowa	Invasion of Poland		1939-09-08		Poland	Germany	Allies
Radom	Invasion of Poland		1939-09-08	1939-09-09	Poland	Germany	Axis
Gdynia	Invasion of Poland		1939-09-08	1939-09-14	Poland	Germany	Axis
Warsaw	Invasion of Poland		1939-09-08	1939-09-28	Poland	Germany	Axis
Bzura	Invasion of Poland		1939-09-09	1939-09-19	Poland	Germany	Axis
Kampinos Forest	Invasion of Poland		1939-09-09	1939-09-20	Poland	Germany	Axis
Jarosław	Invasion of Poland		1939-09-10	1939-09-11	Poland	Germany	Axis
Kępa Oksywska	Invasion of Poland		1939-09-10	1939-09-19	Poland	Germany	Axis
Kałuszyn	Invasion of Poland		1939-09-11	1939-09-12	Poland	Germany	Allies
Przemyśl	Invasion of Poland		1939-09-11	1939-09-14	Poland	Germany	Axis
Lwów	Invasion of Poland		1939-09-12	1939-09-22	Poland	Germany; Soviet Union	Axis/Soviet
Modlin	Invasion of Poland		1939-09-13	1939-09-29	Poland	Germany	Axis
Jaworów	Invasion of Poland		1939-09-14	1939-09-16	Poland	Germany	Allies
Brześć Litewski	Invasion of Poland		1939-09-14	1939-09-17	Poland	Germany	Axis
Kobryń	Invasion of Poland		1939-09-14	1939-09-18	Poland	Germany	Inconclusive
Tomaszów Lubelski	Invasion of Poland		1939-09-17	1939-09-26	Poland	Germany	Axis
Wilno	Soviet invasion of Poland	Invasion of Poland	1939-09-18	1939-09-19	Poland	Soviet Union	Soviet
Wólka Węglowa	Invasion of Poland		1939-09-19		Poland	Germany	Allies
Krasnystaw	Invasion of Poland		1939-09-19	1939-09-20	Poland	Germany	Axis
Grodno	Soviet invasion of Poland	Invasion of Poland	1939-09-20	1939-09-22	Poland	Soviet Union	Soviet
Cześniki	Invasion of Poland		1939-09-21	1939-09-22	Poland	Germany	Allies
Łomianki	Soviet invasion of Poland	Invasion of Poland	1939-09-22		Poland	Soviet Union	Soviet
Krasnobród	Invasion of Poland		1939-09-23		Poland	Germany	Allies
Husynne	Soviet invasion of Poland	Invasion of Poland	1939-09-24		Poland	Soviet Union	Soviet
Władypol	Soviet invasion of Poland	Invasion of Poland	1939-09-27		Poland	Soviet Union	Soviet
Szack	Soviet invasion of Poland	Invasion of Poland	1939-09-28		Poland	Soviet Union	Allies
Wytyczno	Soviet invasion of Poland	Invasion of Poland	1939-10-01		Poland	Soviet Union	Soviet
Kock	Invasion of Poland		1939-10-02	1939-10-05	Poland	Germany	Axis
Suomussalmi	Winter War		1939-11-30	1940-01-08	Finland	Soviet Union	Finnish
Petsamo	Winter War		1939-11-30	1940-03-13	Finland	Soviet Union	Soviet
Salla	Winter War		1939-11-30	1940-03-13	Finland	Soviet Union	Finnish
Ilomantsi (1939)	Winter War		1939-12-10	1939-12-16	Finland	Soviet Union	Stalemate
River Plate	Battle of the Atlantic		1939-12-13		United Kingdom; New Zealand	Germany	Allies
Taipale	Winter War		1939-12-06	1939-12-27	Finland	Soviet Union	Finnish
Kollaa	Winter War		1939-12-07	1940-03-13	Finland	Soviet Union	Finnish
Varolampi Pond	Winter War		1939-12-10	1939-12-11	Finland	Soviet Union	Finnish
Tolvajärvi	Winter War		1939-12-12		Finland	Soviet Union	Finnish
Summa (first)	Winter War		1939-12-16	1939-12-22	Finland	Soviet Union	Finnish
Kelja	Winter War		1939-12-25	1939-12-27	Finland	Soviet Union	Finnish

== Battles in 1940 ==
Allied or Finnish (Note: The Finnish are grouped in with the Allies in 1939 and 1940 despite not being a member of the Allied powers due to limited backing of Finland by the Allies.) victory
Axis/Soviet (Note: The Soviet Union is grouped in with the Axis powers in 1939 and 1940 despite not being a member of the Axis powers as they fought against Poland, which was a member of the Allies, and Finland, which received backing from the Allies.)/Japanese/Vichy (Note: In battles against the Allies.) Victory
Another result (e.g., stalemate, inconclusive, disputed) or battles that cannot be divided between the Allies and the Axis.

Battle	Campaign	Theatre	Start	End	Allies	Axis	Victory
Raate Road	Winter War		1940-01-01	1940-01-07	Finland	Soviet Union	Finnish
Kuhmo	Winter War		1940-01-28	1940-03-13	Finland	Soviet Union	Stalemate
Summa (second)	Winter War		1940-02-01	1940-02-15	Finland	Soviet Union	Soviet
Altmark	Phoney War	Western Front	1940-02-16		United Kingdom	Germany	Allies
Honkaniemi	Winter War		1940-02-25	1940-02-27	Finland	Soviet Union	Soviet
Vyborg Bay (1940)	Winter War		1940-03-02	1940-03-13	Finland	Soviet Union	Ceasefire
Oslofjord	Norwegian campaign	Western Front	1940-04-08		Norway	Germany	Axis
German invasion of Denmark	Operation Weserübung	Western Front	1940-04-09		Denmark	Germany	Axis
Drøbak Sound	Norwegian campaign	Western Front	1940-04-09		Norway	Germany	Allies
Fornebu	Norwegian campaign	Western Front	1940-04-09		Norway	Germany	Axis
Horten Harbour	Norwegian campaign	Western Front	1940-04-09		Norway	Germany	Axis
Kristiansand	Norwegian campaign	Western Front	1940-04-09		Norway	Germany	Axis
Lofoten	Norwegian campaign	Western Front	1940-04-09		United Kingdom	Germany	Allies
Narvik	Norwegian campaign	Western Front	1940-04-09	1940-06-08	Norway; France; United Kingdom; Poland	Germany	Allies
Narvik (naval Norwegian)	Norwegian campaign	Western Front	1940-04-09		Norway	Germany	Axis
Midtskogen	Norwegian campaign	Western Front	1940-04-10		Norway	Germany	Allies
Narvik (first naval)	Norwegian campaign	Western Front	1940-04-10		United Kingdom	Germany	Allies
Narvik (second naval)	Norwegian campaign	Western Front	1940-04-13		United Kingdom	Germany	Allies
Dombås	Norwegian campaign	Western Front	1940-04-14	1940-04-19	Norway	Germany	Allies
Hegra Fortress	Norwegian campaign	Western Front	1940-04-15	1940-05-05	Norway	Germany	Axis
Namsos	Norwegian campaign	Western Front	1940-04	1940-05	United Kingdom; France; Norway	Germany	Axis
Åndalsnes	Norwegian campaign	Western Front	1940-04-19	1940-05	United Kingdom; Norway	Germany	Axis
Gratangen	Norwegian campaign	Western Front	1940-04-23	1940-04-25	Norway	Germany	Axis
Høljarast Bridge	Norwegian campaign	Western Front	1940-04-24		Norway	Germany	Axis
Kvam	Norwegian campaign	Western Front	1940-04-25	1940-04-26	United Kingdom; Norway	Germany	Axis
Vinjesvingen	Norwegian campaign	Western Front	1940-05-03	1940-05-05	Norway	Germany	Axis
Nordland	Norwegian campaign	Western Front	1940-05-08	1940-06-01	United Kingdom; Norway	Germany	Axis
The Hague	German invasion of the Netherlands	Western Front	1940-05-10		Netherlands	Germany	Allies
Invasion of Iceland	Allied occupation of Iceland	Western Front	1940-05-10		United Kingdom	Iceland	British
German invasion of Luxembourg		Western Front	1940-05-10		Luxembourg	Germany	Axis
Maastricht	German invasion of the Netherlands	Western Front	1940-05-10		Netherlands	Germany	Axis
Fort Ében-Émael	German invasion of Belgium	Western Front	1940-05-10	1940-05-11	Belgium	Germany	Axis
Mill	German invasion of the Netherlands	Western Front	1940-05-10	1940-05-11	Netherlands	Germany	Axis
Rotterdam	German invasion of the Netherlands	Western Front	1940-05-10	1940-05-14	Netherlands	Germany	Axis
Zeeland	German invasion of the Netherlands	Western Front	1940-05-10	1940-05-18	Netherlands; France; United Kingdom	Germany	Axis
Grebbeberg	German invasion of the Netherlands	Western Front	1940-05-11	1940-05-13	Netherlands	Germany	Axis
Afsluitdijk	German invasion of the Netherlands	Western Front	1940-05-12	1940-05-14	Netherlands	Germany	Axis
Hannut	German invasion of Belgium	Western Front	1940-05-12	1940-05-14	Belgium	Germany	Axis
Sedan	Battle of France	Western Front	1940-05-12	1940-05-17	France; United Kingdom	Germany	Axis
Rotterdam Blitz	German invasion of the Netherlands	Western Front	1940-05-14		Netherlands	Germany	Axis
Gembloux	German invasion of Belgium	Western Front	1940-05-14	1940-05-15	France	Germany	Allies
Montcornet	Battle of France	Western Front	1940-05-17		France	Germany	Allies
Arras	Battle of France	Western Front	1940-05-21		France; United Kingdom	Germany	Axis
Boulogne	Battle of France	Western Front	1940-05-22	1940-05-25	France; United Kingdom; Belgium	Germany	Axis
Calais	Battle of France	Western Front	1940-05-22	1940-05-26	France; United Kingdom; Belgium	Germany	Axis
Lys	German invasion of Belgium	Western Front	1940-05-24	1940-05-28	France; United Kingdom; Belgium	Germany	Axis
Ypres–Comines Canal	German invasion of Belgium	Western Front	1940-05-26	1940-05-28	United Kingdom; Belgium	Germany	Allies
Dunkirk	Battle of France	Western Front	1940-05-26	1940-06-04	France; United Kingdom; Belgium; Netherlands	Germany	Axis
Abbeville	Battle of France	Western Front	1940-05-27	1940-06-04	France; United Kingdom	Germany	Axis
Lille	Battle of France	Western Front	1940-05-28	1940-05-31	France	Germany	Axis
Operation Paula	Battle of France	Western Front	1940-06-03		France	Germany	Axis
Fall Rot	Battle of France	Western Front	1940-06-05	1940-06-25	France; United Kingdom	Germany	Axis
Operation Juno	Norwegian campaign	Western Front	1940-06-08		United Kingdom	Germany	Axis
Italian invasion of France	Battle of France	Western Front	1940-06-10	1940-06-25	France; United Kingdom	Italy	Axis
Siege of Malta		Mediterranean Front	1940-06-11	1942-11-20	United Kingdom; Canada; Australia; Free France; Greece	Italy; Germany	Allies
Lagarde	Battle of France	Western Front	1940-06-17	1940-06-18	Poland	Germany	Axis
Saumur	Battle of France	Western Front	1940-06-18	1940-06-20	France	Germany	Axis
Operation Collar	British Commando operations	Western Front	1940-06-24	1940-06-25	United Kingdom	Germany	Axis
Espero Convoy	Mediterranean Front		1940-06-28		United Kingdom; Australia	Italy	Inconclusive
Soviet occupation of Bessarabia and Northern Bukovina			1940-06-28	1940-07-03	Romania	Soviet Union; Germany	Soviet
Mers-el-Kébir	Mediterranean Front		1940-07-03		United Kingdom	France	Allies
Kassala	East African campaign	African Front	1940-07-04		United Kingdom	Italy	Axis
Kanalkampf	Battle of Britain	Western Front	1940-07-04	1940-08-11	United Kingdom; Netherlands; Norway; Canada	Germany	Inconclusive
Calabria	Mediterranean Front		1940-07-09		United Kingdom; Australia	Italy	Inconclusive
Operation Ambassador	British Commando operations	Western Front	1940-07-14	1940-07-15	United Kingdom	Germany	Axis
Cape Spada	Mediterranean Front		1940-07-19		United Kingdom; Australia	Italy	Allies
Italian invasion of British Somaliland	East African campaign		1940-08-03	1940-08-19	United Kingdom; Australia; South Africa	Italy	Axis
Tug Argan	East African campaign	African Front	1940-08-11	1940-08-15	United Kingdom	Italy	Axis
Adlertag	Battle of Britain	Western Front	1940-08-13		United Kingdom	Germany	Allies
The Hardest Day	Battle of Britain	Western Front	1940-08-18		United Kingdom	Germany	Inconclusive
The Blitz	Battle of Britain	Western Front	1940-09-07	1941-05-11	United Kingdom	Germany; Italy	Inconclusive
Italian invasion of Egypt	Western Desert campaign	African Front	1940-09-09	1940-09-16	United Kingdom; Free France	Italy	Axis
Battle of Britain Day	Battle of Britain	Western Front	1940-09-15		United Kingdom	Germany	Allies
Lạng Sơn	Japanese invasion of French Indochina	South-East Asian Front	1940-09-22	1940-09-26	Vichy France	Japan	Japanese
Dakar	West African campaign	African Front	1940-09-23	1940-09-25	United Kingdom; Free France; Australia	Vichy France	Vichy
Graveney Marsh	Battle of Britain	Western Front	1940-09-27		United Kingdom	Germany	Allies
Franco-Thai War		South-East Asian Front	1940-10	1941-01-28	Vichy France	Thailand	Thai
Cape Passero	Battle of the Mediterranean	Mediterranean Front	1940-10-12		United Kingdom	Italy	Allies
Convoy BN 7	East African campaign	African Front	1940-10-20	1940-10-21	United Kingdom; New Zealand; Australia	Italy	Allies
Gabon	West African campaign	African Front	1940-10-27	1940-11-12	Free France; United Kingdom	Vichy France	Allies
Pindus	Greco–Italian War	Mediterranean Front	1940-10-28	1940-11-13	Greece	Italy	Allies
Konitsa	Greco–Italian War	Mediterranean Front	1940-11-01		Greece	Italy	Axis
Elaia–Kalamas	Greco–Italian War	Mediterranean Front	1940-11-02	1940-11-08	Greece	Italy	Allies
Taranto	Mediterranean Front		1940-11-11	1940-11-12	United Kingdom	Italy	Allies
Morava–Ivan	Greco–Italian War	Mediterranean Front	1940-11-14	1940-11-23	Greece	Italy; Albania	Allies
Korytsa	Greco–Italian War	Mediterranean Front	1940-11-16	1940-11-22	Greece	Italy	Allies
Cape Spartivento	Mediterranean Front		1940-11-27		United Kingdom	Italy	Inconclusive
Saranda	Greco–Italian War	Mediterranean Front	1940-12		Greece	Italy	Allies
Nibeiwa	Western Desert campaign	African Front	1940-12-09		United Kingdom	Italy	Allies
Sidi Barrani	Western Desert campaign	African Front	1940-12-10	1940-12-11	United Kingdom; Australia; Free France	Italy	Allies
Himara	Greco–Italian War	Mediterranean Front	1940-12-13	1940-12-22	Greece	Italy	Allies
Giarabub	Western Desert campaign	African Front	1940-12-25	1941-03-21	United Kingdom; Australia	Italy	Allies

== Battles in 1941 ==
Allied or Chinese victory
Axis Victory
Another result (e.g., stalemate, inconclusive, disputed)

Battle	Campaign	Theatre	Start	End	Allies	Axis	Victory
Bardia	Western Desert campaign	African Front	1941-01-03	1941-01-05	Australia; United Kingdom; Free France	Italy	Allies
British capture of Tobruk	Western Desert campaign	African Front	1941-01-06	1941-01-22	United Kingdom; Australia	Italy	Allies
Klisura Pass	Greco–Italian War	Mediterranean Front	1941-01-06	1941-01-11	Greece	Italy	Allies
Operation Excess	Battle of the Mediterranean	Mediterranean Front	1941-01-10	1941-01-11	United Kingdom; Australia	Italy; Germany	Allies
Operation Berlin (Atlantic)	Battle of the Atlantic		1941-01-22	1941-03-22	United Kingdom	Germany	Axis
Mechili	Western Desert campaign	African Front	1941-01-24		United Kingdom	Italy	Allies
Agordat (1941)	East African campaign	African Front	1941-01-26	1941-01-31	United Kingdom	Italy	Allies
Trebeshina	Greco–Italian War	Mediterranean Front	1941-01-29	1941-02-17	Greece	Italy	Allies
Kufra	Western Desert campaign	African Front	1941-01-31	1941-03-01	Free France; United Kingdom	Italy	Allies
Keren	East African campaign	African Front	1941-02-03	1941-03-27	United Kingdom; Free France	Italy	Allies
Beda Fomm	Western Desert campaign	African Front	1941-02-06	1941-02-07	United Kingdom; Australia	Italy	Allies
Operation Sonnenblume	Western Desert campaign	African Front	1941-02-06	1941-05-25	United Kingdom; Australia	Germany; Italy	Axis
Action of 27 February 1941		Indian Ocean	1941-02-27		New Zealand	Italy	Allies
Operation Claymore	British Commando operations	Western Front	1941-03-04		United Kingdom Norway	Germany	Allies
Hill 731	Greco–Italian War	Mediterranean Front	1941-03-09	1941-03-24	Greece	Italy	Allies
Shanggao	Second Sino-Japanese War		1941-03-14	1941-04-09	China	Japan	Chinese
Operation Appearance	East African campaign	African Front	1941-03-15	1941-04-08	United Kingdom	Italy	Allies
Saïo	East African campaign	African Front	1941-03-25	1941-07-06	Belgium; United Kingdom; Ethiopian Empire; South Africa	Italy	Allies
Souda Bay	Mediterranean Front		1941-03-26		United Kingdom; Norway	Italy	Axis
Cape Matapan	Mediterranean Front		1941-03-27	1941-03-29	United Kingdom; Australia	Italy	Allies
4 April 1941	Battle of the Atlantic		1941-04-04		United Kingdom	Germany	Axis
Operation Retribution (1941)	Balkans campaign	Mediterranean Front	1941-04-06	1941-04-08	Yugoslavia	Germany	Axis
Metaxas Line	Balkans campaign	Mediterranean Front	1941-04-06	1941-04-09	Greece	Germany	Axis
Invasion of Yugoslavia	Balkans campaign	Mediterranean Front	1941-04-06	1941-04-18	Yugoslavia	Germany; Hungary; Italy	Axis
Tobruk	Western Desert campaign	African Front	1941-04-10	1941-11-27	Australia; United Kingdom; New Zealand; Poland; Czechoslovakia	Germany; Italy	Allies
Vevi	Balkans campaign	Mediterranean Front	1941-04-11	1941-04-12	Australia; Greece; New Zealand; United Kingdom	Germany	Axis
Ptolemaida	Balkans campaign	Mediterranean Front	1941-04-13		United Kingdom; Australia; New Zealand	Germany	Axis
Kleisoura Pass	Balkans campaign	Mediterranean Front	1941-04-13	1941-04-14	Greece	Germany	Axis
Lake Kastoria	Balkans campaign	Mediterranean Front	1941-04-15		Greece	Germany	Axis
Tarigo Convoy	Mediterranean Front		1941-04-16		United Kingdom	Italy	Allies
Tempe Gorge	Balkans campaign	Mediterranean Front	1941-04-18		Australia; New Zealand	Germany	Allies
Bardia Raid	Western Desert campaign	African Front	1941-04-19	1941-04-20	United Kingdom; Australia	Germany; Italy	Allies
Athens	Balkans campaign	Mediterranean Front	1941-04-20		United Kingdom	Germany	Axis
Thermopylae	Balkans campaign	Mediterranean Front	1941-04-24	1941-04-25	Australia; New Zealand	Germany	Axis
Anglo-Iraqi War		Middle Eastern Front	1941-05-02	1941-05-31	United Kingdom; Australia; New Zealand; Greece	Iraq; Germany; Italy; Vichy France	Allies
Amba Alagi	East African campaign	African Front	1941-05-04	1941-05-19	United Kingdom; South Africa; Ethiopian Empire	Italy	Allies
Convoy OB 318	Battle of the Atlantic		1941-05-07	1941-05-10	United Kingdom	Germany	Allies
Action of 8 May 1941		Indian Ocean	1941-05-08		United Kingdom	Germany	Allies
Operation Brevity	Western Desert campaign	African Front	1941-05-15	1941-05-16	United Kingdom; Australia	Germany; Italy	Inconclusive
Last battle of Bismarck	Battle of the Atlantic		1941-05-18	1941-05-27	United Kingdom; Poland	Germany	Allies
Rethymno	Balkans campaign	Mediterranean Front	1941-05-20	1941-05-29	Australia; Greece	Germany	Axis
Crete	Balkans campaign	Mediterranean Front	1941-05-20	1941-06-01	New Zealand; Greece; United Kingdom; Australia	Germany; Italy	Axis
Denmark Strait	Battle of the Atlantic		1941-05-24		United Kingdom	Germany	Axis
Operation Skorpion	Western Desert campaign	African Front	1941-05-26	1941-05-27	United Kingdom	Germany	Axis
42nd Street	Balkans campaign	Mediterranean Front	1941-05-27		Australia; New Zealand	Germany	Allies
Litani River	Syria–Lebanon campaign	Middle Eastern Front	1941-06-09		United Kingdom; Australia	Vichy France	Allies
Jezzine	Syria–Lebanon campaign	Middle Eastern Front	1941-06-13	1941-06-14	Australia	Vichy France	Allies
Sidon	Syria–Lebanon campaign	Middle Eastern Front	1941-06-13	1941-06-15	Australia	Vichy France	Allies
Operation Battleaxe	Western Desert campaign	African Front	1941-06-15	1941-06-17	United Kingdom; Poland; Czechoslovakia	Germany; Italy	Axis
Kissoué	Syria–Lebanon campaign	Middle Eastern Front	1941-06-15	1941-06-17	United Kingdom; Free France	Vichy France	Allies
Damascus	Syria–Lebanon campaign	Middle Eastern Front	1941-06-18	1941-06-21	United Kingdom; Australia; Free France	Vichy France	Allies
Merdjayoun	Syria–Lebanon campaign	Middle Eastern Front	1941-06-19	1941-06-24	United Kingdom; Australia	Vichy France	Allies
Palmyra	Syria–Lebanon campaign	Middle Eastern Front	1941-06-21	1941-07-02	United Kingdom	Vichy France	Allies
Operation Rentier	Continuation War	Eastern Front	1941-06-22		Soviet Union	Germany	Axis
Brest Fortress	Continuation War	Eastern Front	1941-06-22	1941-06-29	Soviet Union	Germany	Axis
Białystok–Minsk	Continuation War	Eastern Front	1941-06-22	1941-07-09	Soviet Union	Germany	Axis
Gulf of Riga	Baltic Sea campaigns	Eastern Front	1941-06-22	1941-08	Soviet Union	Germany	Axis
Soviet submarine campaign (1941)	Baltic Sea campaigns	Eastern Front	1941-06-22	1941-11	Soviet Union	Germany	Inconclusive
Hanko	Continuation War	Eastern Front	1941-06-22	1941-12-02	Soviet Union	Finland	Axis
German-Soviet air war 22 June 1941	Operation Barbarossa	Eastern Front	1941-06-22		Soviet Union	Germany	Axis
Raseiniai	Operation Barbarossa	Eastern Front	1941-06-23	1941-06-27	Soviet Union	Germany	Axis
Brody	Operation Barbarossa	Eastern Front	1941-06-23	1941-06-30	Soviet Union	Germany	Axis
Operation Platinum Fox	Continuation War	Eastern Front	1941-06-29	1941-09-21	Soviet Union	Germany; Finland	Allies
Finnish invasion of Ladoga Karelia	Continuation War	Eastern Front	1941-07	1941-08	Soviet Union	Germany; Finland	Axis
Operation Arctic Fox	Continuation War	Eastern Front	1941-07-01	1941-11-17	Soviet Union	Germany; Finland	Stalemate
Operation München	Operation Barbarossa	Eastern Front	1941-07-02	1941-07-26	Soviet Union	Romania; Germany	Axis
Deir ez-Zor	Syria–Lebanon campaign	Middle Eastern Front	1941-07-03		United Kingdom	Vichy France	Allies
Damour	Syria–Lebanon campaign	Middle Eastern Front	1941-07-05	1941-07-09	Australia	Vichy France	Allies
Kiev (1941)	Operation Barbarossa	Eastern Front	1941-07-07	1941-09-26	Soviet Union	Germany	Axis
Smolensk (1941)	Operation Barbarossa	Eastern Front	1941-07-10		Soviet Union	Germany	Axis
Finnish invasion of East Karelia	Continuation War	Eastern Front	1941-07-10	1941-12-06	Soviet Union	Finland; Germany	Axis
Beirut	Syria–Lebanon campaign	Middle Eastern Front	1941-07-12		United Kingdom; Australia; Free France	Vichy France	Allies
Operation Substance	Battle of the Mediterranean	Mediterranean Front	1941-07-13	1941-07-28	United Kingdom; Australia	Italy	Allies
Uman	Operation Barbarossa	Eastern Front	1941-07-15	1941-08-08	Soviet Union	Germany; Romania; Hungary; Slovakia	Axis
Twin Pimples	Western Desert campaign	African Front	1941-07-17	1941-07-18	United Kingdom; Australia	Italy	Allies
Bengtskär	Continuation War	Eastern Front	1941-07-26		Soviet Union	Finland	Axis
Operation EF	Continuation War	Eastern Front	1941-07-30		United Kingdom	Germany; Finland	Axis
Finnish invasion of the Karelian Isthmus	Continuation War	Eastern Front	1941-07-31	1941-09-05	Soviet Union	Finland	Axis
Culqualber	East African campaign	African Front	1941-08-06	1941-11-21	United Kingdom; South Africa; Ethiopian Empire	Italy	Allies
Odessa (1941)	Operation Barbarossa	Eastern Front	1941-08-08	1941-10-16	Soviet Union	Romania; Germany; Italy	Axis
Anglo-Soviet invasion of Iran		Middle Eastern Front	1941-08-25	1941-08-31	Soviet Union; United Kingdom; Australia	Iran	Allies
Soviet evacuation of Tallinn	Continuation War	Eastern Front	1941-08-27	1941-08-31	Soviet Union	Finland; Germany	Axis
Porlampi	Continuation War	Eastern Front	1941-08-30	1941-09-01	Soviet Union	Finland	Axis
Loznica	Uprising in Serbia	Mediterranean Front	1941-08-31		Chetniks	Germany	Allies
Changsha (second)	Second Sino-Japanese War		1941-09-06	1941-10-08	China	Japan	Allies
Leningrad	Operation Barbarossa	Eastern Front	1941-09-08	1944-01-27	Soviet Union	Germany; Finland; Italy	Allies
Operation Beowulf	Baltic Sea campaigns	Eastern Front	1941-09-09	1941-10-21	Soviet Union	Germany	Axis
Šabac	Uprising in Serbia	Mediterranean Front	1941-09-21	1941-09-26	Chetniks; Yugoslav Partisans	Germany; Croatia	Axis
Kruševac	Uprising in Serbia	Mediterranean Front	1941-09-23	1941-09-27	Chetniks; Yugoslav Partisans	Germany	Axis
Sea of Azov	Operation Barbarossa	Eastern Front	1941-09-26	1941-10-11	Soviet Union	Germany; Romania	Axis
Operation Halberd	Battle of the Mediterranean	Mediterranean Front	1941-09-27		United Kingdom; Netherlands; Poland	Italy	Allies
Petrikowka	Operation Barbarossa	Eastern Front	1941-09-27	1941-09-30	Soviet Union	Italy	Axis
Operation Uzice	Uprising in Serbia	Mediterranean Front	1941-09-27	1941-11-29	Chetniks; Yugoslav Partisans	Germany; Croatia	Axis
Bryansk	Operation Barbarossa	Eastern Front	1941-09-30	1941-10-21	Soviet Union	Germany	Axis
Moscow	Operation Barbarossa	Eastern Front	1941-09-30	1942-01-07	Soviet Union	Germany	Allies
Kraljevo	Uprising in Serbia	Mediterranean Front	1941-10-09	1941-10-31	Chetniks; Yugoslav Partisans	Germany	Axis
Borodino Field	Operation Barbarossa	Eastern Front	1941-10-13	1942-01-18	Soviet Union	Germany	Allies
Rogatica (1941)	Yugoslavia	Mediterranean Front	1941-10-13	1941-10-24	Chetniks; Yugoslav Partisans	Croatia	Allies
Tikhvin	Operation Barbarossa	Eastern Front	1941-10-16	1941-12-31	Soviet Union	Germany	Allies
Crimean campaign	Operation Barbarossa	Eastern Front	1941-10-18	1944-07-04	Soviet Union	Germany; Romania; Italy	Axis
Kharkov (first)	Operation Barbarossa	Eastern Front	1941-10-20	1941-10-24	Soviet Union	Germany	Axis
Sevastopol	Operation Barbarossa	Eastern Front	1941-10-30	1942-07-04	Soviet Union	Germany; Romania; Italy	Axis
Novi Pazar	Uprising in Serbia	Mediterranean Front	1941-11	1941-12	Albania; Sandžaks	Chetniks; Yugoslav Partisans	Axis
Olovo	Uprising in Bosnia and Herzegovina	Mediterranean Front	1941-11-01	1941-12-17	Chetniks; Yugoslav Partisans	Croatia	Allies
Trešnjica	Uprising in Serbia	Mediterranean Front	1941-11-02		Yugoslav Partisans	Chetniks	Allies
Duisburg Convoy	Mediterranean Front		1941-11-08	1941-11-09	United Kingdom	Italy	Allies
Operation Flipper	Operation Crusader, Western Desert campaign	African Front	1941-11-10	1941-11-18	United Kingdom	Germany; Italy	Axis
Gondar	East African campaign	African Front	1941-11-13	1941-11-27	United Kingdom; South Africa; Ethiopian Empire	Italy	Allies
Operation Crusader	Western Desert campaign	African Front	1941-11-18	1941-12-30	United Kingdom; New Zealand; South Africa; Australia; Poland; Czechoslovakia	Italy; Germany	Allies
Bir el Gubi (first)	Western Desert campaign	African Front	1941-11-19		United Kingdom	Italy	Axis
Point 175	Western Desert campaign	African Front	1941-11-29	1941-12-01	New Zealand	Italy	Axis
Pljevlja	Uprising in Montenegro	Mediterranean Front	1941-12-01	1941-12-02	Yugoslav Partisans	Italy	Axis
Bir el Gubi (second)	Western Desert campaign	African Front	1941-12-04	1941-12-07	United Kingdom	Italy; Germany	Axis
Operation Mihailovic	Uprising in Serbia	Mediterranean Front	1941-12-04	1941-12-09	Chetniks	Germany	Axis
Japanese invasion of Thailand		Pacific War	1941-12-07		Thailand	Japan	Axis
Kota Bharu	Malayan campaign	Pacific War	1941-12-08 (local)		United Kingdom; Australia; New Zealand	Japan	Axis
Pearl Harbor	Central Pacific	Pacific War	1941-12-07		United States	Japan	Axis
Batan Island	Philippines campaign (Axis)	Pacific War	1941-12-08		United States	Japan	Axis
Clark Field	Philippines campaign (Axis)	Pacific War	1941-12-08		United States	Japan	Axis
Midway bombardment (first)		Pacific War	1941-12-07 (local)		United States	Japan	Axis
Operation Krohcol	Malayan campaign	Pacific War	1941-12-08	1941-12-13	United Kingdom	Japan	Axis
Hong Kong		Pacific War	1941-12-08	1941-12-25	United Kingdom; Canada; China; Free France	Japan	Axis
Japanese invasion of Thailand		Pacific War	1941-12-08		Thailand	Japan	Axis
Singapore (1941)	Malayan campaign	Pacific War	1941-12-08		United Kingdom	Japan	Inconclusive
Guam (1941)		Pacific War	1941-12-08	1941-12-10	United States	Japan	Axis
Wake Island		Pacific War	1941-12-08	1941-12-23	United States	Japan	Axis
Sinking of Prince of Wales and Repulse	Malayan campaign	Pacific War	1941-12-10		United Kingdom	Japan	Axis
Vigan	Philippines campaign (Axis)	Pacific War	1941-12-10		United States	Japan	Axis
Aparri	Philippines campaign (Axis)	Pacific War	1941-12-10		United States	Japan	Axis
Jitra	Malayan campaign	Pacific War	1941-12-10	1941-12-13	United Kingdom	Japan	Axis
Legazpi	Philippines campaign (Axis)	Pacific War	1941-12-12		United States	Japan	Axis
Cape Bon	Mediterranean Front		1941-12-13		United Kingdom; Netherlands	Italy	Allies
Japanese invasion of Burma	Burma campaign	South-East Asian Front	1941-12-14	1942-05-28	United Kingdom; China; United States	Japan; Thailand	Axis
Gurun	Malayan campaign	Pacific Front	1941-12-14	1941-12-16	United Kingdom	Japan	Axis
Kerch Peninsula	Operation Barbarossa	Eastern Front	1941-12-16	1942-05-19	Soviet Union	Germany; Romania	Axis
Sirte (first)	Mediterranean Front		1941-12-17		United Kingdom; Australia; Netherlands	Italy	Inconclusive
Alexandria	Mediterranean Front		1941-12-19		United Kingdom	Italy	Axis
Davao	Philippines campaign (Axis)	Pacific Front	1941-12-19	1941-12-25	United States	Japan	Axis
Lingayen Gulf	Philippines campaign (Axis)	Pacific Front	1941-12-21	1941-12-23	United States	Japan	Axis
Lamon Bay	Philippines campaign (Axis)	Pacific Front	1941-12-21	1941-12-23	United States	Japan	Axis
Sjenica	Uprising in Serbia	Mediterranean Front	1941-12-22		Yugoslav Partisans	Sandžaks; Italy; Germany	Axis
Changsha (third)	Second Sino-Japanese War		1941-12-24	1942-01-15	China	Japan	Allies
Operation Anklet	British Commando operations	Western Front	1941-12-26	1941-12-27	United Kingdom Norway Poland	Germany	Allies
Operation Archery	British Commando operations	Western Front	1941-12-27		United Kingdom; Norway	Germany	Allies
Kampar	Malayan Campaign	Pacific Front	1941-12-30	1942-01-02	United Kingdom	Japan	Allies

== Battles in 1942 ==
Battle	Campaign	Theatre	Start	End	Allies	Axis	Victory
Slim River	Malayan Campaign	Pacific Front	1942-01-05	1942-01-07	British Empire	Japan	Axis
Bataan	Philippines campaign (Axis)	Pacific Front	1942-01-07	1942-04-09	United States	Japan	Axis
Kuala Lumpur	Malayan campaign	Pacific Front	1942-01-11		United Kingdom	Japan	Axis
Gemas	Malayan campaign	Pacific Front	1942-01-14		Australia	Japan	Allies
Muar	Malayan campaign	Pacific Front	1942-01-14	1942-01-22	United Kingdom; Australia	Japan	Axis
Endau	Malayan campaign	Pacific Front	1942-01-26	1942-01-27	United Kingdom; Australia	Japan	Axis
Makassar Strait	Dutch East Indies campaign	Pacific Front	1942-02-04		Netherlands; United States	Japan	Axis
Sarimbun Beach	Battle of Singapore	Pacific Front	1942-02-08	1942-02-09	Australia	Japan	Axis
Kranji	Battle of Singapore	Pacific Front	1942-02-09	1942-02-10	Australia	Japan	Axis
Bukit Timah	Battle of Singapore	Pacific Front	1942-02-10	1942-02-12	United Kingdom; Australia	Japan	Axis
Channel Dash	Battle of the Atlantic	Western Front	1942-02-11	1942-02-13	United Kingdom	Germany	Axis
Operation Donnerkeil	Channel Dash, Battle of the Atlantic	Western Front	1942-02-11	1942-03-12	United Kingdom	Germany	Axis
Pasir Panjang	Battle of Singapore	Pacific Front	1942-02-13	1942-02-15	United Kingdom	Japan	Axis
Bilin River	Japanese invasion of Burma	South-East Asian Front	1942-02-14	1942-02-19	United Kingdom	Japan	Axis
Badung Strait	Dutch East Indies campaign	Pacific Front	1942-02-19	1942-02-20	Netherlands; United States; United Kingdom	Japan	Axis
Sittang Bridge	Japanese invasion of Burma	South-East Asian Front	1942-02-22	1942-02-23	United Kingdom	Japan	Axis
Operation Biting	British Commando operations	Western Front	1942-02-27	1942-02-28	United Kingdom	Germany	Allies
Java Sea	Dutch East Indies campaign	Pacific Front	1942-02-27		Netherlands; United States; United Kingdom; Australia	Japan	Axis
Java (1942)	Dutch East Indies campaign	Pacific Front	1942-02-28	1942-03-12	Netherlands; United States; United Kingdom; Australia	Japan	Axis
Operation Sportpalast	Arctic convoys	Western Front	1942-03-06	1942-03-13	United Kingdom	Germany	Inconclusive
Pegu	Japanese invasion of Burma	South-East Asian Front	1942-03-06	1942-03-07	United Kingdom	Japan	Axis
Taukkyan Roadblock	Japanese invasion of Burma	South-East Asian Front	1942-03-07	1942-03-08	United Kingdom	Japan	Allies
Yunnan–Burma Road	Japanese invasion of Burma	South-East Asian Front	1942-03-18	1942-07-12	China; United Kingdom; United States	Japan; Thailand	Axis
Suursaari	Continuation War	Eastern Front	1942-03-26	1942-04-02	Soviet Union	Finland	Axis
St Nazaire Raid	British Commando operations	Western Front	1942-03-28		United Kingdom	Germany	Allies
Prome (1942)	Japanese invasion of Burma	South-East Asian Front	1942-03-30	1942-04-02	United Kingdom	Japan	Axis
Christmas Island	Dutch East Indies campaign	Pacific Front	1942-03-31	1942-04-01	United Kingdom; United States	Japan	Axis
Indian Ocean raid		Indian Ocean	1942-03-31	1942-04-10	United Kingdom; Australia; Netherlands; United States	Japan	Axis
Augsburg raid	Strategic Bombing		1942-04-17		United Kingdom	Germany	Axis
Nanos	Slovene Lands	Mediterranean Front	1942-04-18		Slovene Partisans	Italy	Axis
Doolittle Raid	Central Pacific	Pacific Front	1942-04-18		United States; China	Japan	Allies
Operation Abercrombie	British Commando operations	Western Front	1942-04-21	1942-04-22	United Kingdom Canada	Germany	Axis
Coral Sea	New Guinea campaign	Pacific Front	1942-05-04	1942-05-08	United States; Australia	Japan	Allies
Corregidor	Philippines campaign (Axis)	Pacific Front	1942-05-05	1942-05-06	United States	Japan	Axis
Madagascar		Indian Ocean	1942-05-05	1942-11-06	Free France; United Kingdom; South Africa; Australia	Vichy France	Allies
Kharkov (second)	Eastern Front		1942-05-12	1942-05-28	Soviet Union	Germany; Romania; Hungary; Italy	Axis
Adzhimushkay quarry	Operation Barbarossa	Eastern Front	1942-05-16	1942-10-30	Soviet Union	Germany	Axis
Gazala	Western Desert campaign	African Front	1942-05-26	1942-06-21	United Kingdom; South Africa; Free France; Canada	Italy; Germany	Axis
Bir Hakeim	Western Desert campaign	African Front	1942-05-26	1942-06-11	Free France; United Kingdom	Italy; Germany	Inconclusive
Sydney Harbour	Axis naval activity in Australian waters	Pacific Front	1942-05-31	1942-06-08	Australia; United States; United Kingdom; Netherlands	Japan	Inconclusive
Dutch Harbor	Aleutian Islands campaign	American Front	1942-06-03	1942-06-04	United States	Japan	Axis
Midway	Central Pacific	Pacific Front	1942-06-04	1942-06-07	United States	Japan	Allies
Operation Vigorous	Mediterranean Front		1942-06-12	1942-06-16	United Kingdom Australia	Italy Germany	Axis
Tobruk (Second)	Battle of Gazala, Western Desert Campaign	African Front	1942-06-17	1942-06-21	United Kingdom India South Africa	Germany Italy	Axis
Mersa Matruh	Battle of Gazala, Western Desert Campaign	African Front	1942-06-26	1942-06-29	United Kingdom India New Zealand	Germany Italy	Axis
Operation Gearbox	British Commando operations	Western Front	1942-06-30	1942-09-17	Norway United Kingdom	Germany	Allies
Soviet submarine campaign (1942)	Baltic Sea campaigns	Eastern Front	1942-06	1942-10	Soviet Union	Germany; Finland; Sweden	Allies
El Alamein (first)	Western Desert campaign	African Front	1942-07-01	1942-07-27	United Kingdom; New Zealand; Australia; South Africa	Italy; Germany	Inconclusive
Someri	Continuation War	Eastern Front	1942-07-08	1942-07-10	Soviet Union	Finland; Germany	Axis
Stalingrad		Eastern Front	1942-07-17	1943-02-02	Soviet Union	Germany; Romania; Italy; Hungary	Allies
Invasion of Buna–Gona	Kokoda Track campaign	Pacific Front	1942-07-21	1942-07-27	Australia; United States	Japan	Axis
Kokoda	Kokoda Track campaign	Pacific Front	1942-07-28	1942-07-29	Australia	Japan	Axis
Operation Pedestal	Siege of Malta	Mediterranean Front	1942-08-03	1942-08-15	United Kingdom; United States; Malta	ItalyGermany	Inconclusive
Tulagi and Gavutu–Tanambogo	Guadalcanal campaign	Pacific Front	1942-08-07	1942-08-09	United States; United Kingdom	Japan	Allies
Kokoda	Kokoda Track campaign	Pacific Front	1942-08-08	1942-08-10	Australia	Japan	Allies
Savo Island	Guadalcanal campaign	Pacific Front	1942-08-08	1942-08-09	United States; Australia	Japan	Axis
Operation Bigamy	Western Desert campaign	African Front	1942-08-14		United Kingdom	GermanyItaly	Axis
Operation Nicety	Western Desert campaign	African Front	1942-08-15	1942-08-16	United Kingdom	Italy	Axis
Dieppe Raid	British Commando operations	Western Front	1942-08-19		CanadaUnited Kingdom; Free France; United States	Germany	Axis
Sinyavino	Operation Nordlicht (1942)	Eastern Front	1942-08-19	1942-10-10	Soviet Union	Germany	Stalemate
Tenaru	Guadalcanal campaign	Pacific Front	1942-08-21		United States; United Kingdom	Japan	Allies
Eastern Solomons	Guadalcanal campaign	Pacific Front	1942-08-24	1942-08-25	United States	Japan	Allies
Milne Bay	New Guinea campaign	Pacific Front	1942-08-25	1942-09-07	Australia; United States	Japan	Allies
Isurava	Kokoda Track campaign	Pacific Front	1942-08-26	1942-08-31	Australia	Japan	Axis
Alam el Halfa	Western Desert Campaign	North African Campaign	1942-08-30	1942-09-5	United Kingdom; New Zealand	Germany; Italy	Allies
Eora Creek–Templeton's Crossing (first)	Kokoda Track campaign	Pacific Front	1942-08-31	1942-09-05	Australia	Japan	Axis
Operation Dryad	British Commando operations	Western Front	1942-09-02	1942-09-03	United Kingdom	Germany	Allies
Mission Ridge–Brigade Hill	Kokoda Track campaign	Pacific Front	1942-09-06	1942-09-09	Australia	Japan	Inconclusive
Operation Musketoon	British Commando operations	Western Front	1942-09-11	1942-09-21	United Kingdom Norway	Germany	Allies
Operation Aquatint	British Commando operations	Western Front	1942-09-12	1942-09-13	United Kingdom	Germany	Axis
Edson's Ridge	Guadalcanal campaign	Pacific Front	1942-09-12	1942-09-14	United States; United Kingdom	Japan	Allies
Ioribaiwa	Kokoda Track campaign	Pacific Front	1942-09-14	1942-09-16	Australia	Japan	Axis
Matanikau (second)	Guadalcanal campaign	Pacific Front	1942-09-23	1942-09-27	United States	Japan	Axis
Oslo Mosquito Raid	Strategic Bombing	Western Front	1942-09-25		United Kingdom	Germany	Axis
Operation Basalt	British Commando operations	Western Front	1942-10-03	1942-10-04	United Kingdom	Germany	Allies
Matanikau (third)	Guadalcanal campaign	Pacific Front	1942-10-06	1942-10-09	United States	Japan	Allies
Cape Esperance	Guadalcanal campaign	Pacific Front	1942-10-11	1942-10-12	United States	Japan	Allies
Eora Creek–Templeton's Crossing (second)	Kokoda Track campaign	Pacific Front	1942-10-11	1942-10-28	Australia	Japan	Allies
Operation Robinson	Strategic Bombing	Western Front	1942-10-17		United Kingdom	Germany	Inconclusive
Sukho Island	Baltic Sea campaigns	Eastern Front	1942-10-22		Soviet Union	Germany	Allies
Henderson Field	Guadalcanal campaign	Pacific Front	1942-10-23	1942-10-26	United States	Japan	Allies
El Alamein (second)	Western Desert campaign	African Front	1942-10-23	1942-11-11	United Kingdom; New Zealand; Australia; South Africa; Free France; Greece	Italy; Germany	Allies
Santa Cruz Islands	Guadalcanal campaign	Pacific Front	1942-10-25	1942-10-27	United States	Japan	Axis
Operation Title	British Commando operations, Battle of the Atlantic	Western Front	1942-10-26	1942-11-05	United Kingdom Norway	Germany	Axis
Matanikau (fourth)	Guadalcanal campaign	Pacific Front	1942-11-01	1942-11-04	United States	Japan	Allies
Koli Point	Guadalcanal campaign	Pacific Front	1942-11-03	1942-11-12	United States; United Kingdom; Australia	Japan	Allies
Oivi–Gorari	Kokoda Track campaign	Pacific Front	1942-11-04	1942-11-11	Australia	Japan	Allies
Operation Reservist	Operation Torch	African Front	1942-11-08		United States; United Kingdom	Vichy France	Axis
Operation Terminal	Operation Torch	African Front	1942-11-08		United States; United Kingdom	Vichy France	Axis
Port Lyautey	Operation Torch	African Front	1942-11-08	1942-11-10	United States	Vichy France	Allies
Operation Blackstone	Operation Torch	African Front	1942-11-08	1942-11-10	United States	Vichy France	Allies
Casablanca	Operation Torch	African Front	1942-11-08	1942-11-16	United States	Vichy France; Germany	Allies
Case Anton		Western Front	1942-11-10	1942-11-27	Vichy France	Germany Italy	Axis
Italian occupation of Corsica	Case Anton	Mediterranean Front	1942-11-11	1942-11-12	Vichy France	Italy	Axis
Operation Freshman	British Commando operations	Western Front	1942-11-19		United Kingdom	Germany	Axis
Scuttling of the French fleet at Toulon	Case Anton	Western Front	1942-11-27		Vichy France	Germany	Vichy
Skerki Bank	Mediterranean Front		1942-12-02		United Kingdom; Australia	Italy; Germany	Allies
Raid on Algiers	Mediterranean Front		1942-12-11		United KingdomUnited States	Italy	Axis
El Agheila	Western Desert Campaign	African Front	1942-12-11	1942-12-18	United Kingdom; New Zealand	Italy; Germany	Inconclusive
Carlson's patrol	Guadalcanal campaign	Pacific Front	1942-11-06	1942-12-04	United States; United Kingdom; Australia	Japan	Allies
Guadalcanal	Guadalcanal campaign	Pacific Front	1942-11-12	1942-11-15	United States	Japan	Allies
Buna–Gona	New Guinea campaign	Pacific Front	1942-11-16	1943-01-22	United States	Japan	Allies
Tassafaronga	Guadalcanal campaign	Pacific Front	1942-11-30		United States	Japan	Axis
Operation Oyster	Strategic Bombing	Western Front	1942-12-06		United Kingdom	Germany	Allies
Operation Frankton	British Commando operations	Western Front	1942-12-07	1942-12-12	United Kingdom	Germany	Allies
Mount Austen, the Galloping Horse, and the Sea Horse	Guadalcanal campaign	Pacific Front	1942-12-15	1943-01-23	United States; United Kingdom; New Zealand	Japan	Allies

== Battles in 1943 ==
Battle	Campaign	Theatre	Start	End	Allies	Axis	Victory
Operation Weiss	Yugoslavia	Eastern Front	1943-01-20	1943-03	Yugoslav Partisans	Germany; Italy; Croatia; Chetniks (MVAC)	Axis
Tripoli	African Front		1943-01-22	1943-01-23	United Kingdom New Zealand Australia	Italy Germany	Allies
Operation Cartoon	British Commando operations	Western Front	1943-01-23	1943-01-24	United Kingdom Norway	Germany	Allies
Rennell Island	Guadalcanal campaign	Pacific Front	1943-01-29	1943-01-30	United States	Japan	Axis
Wau	New Guinea campaign	Pacific Front	1943-01-29	1943-02-04	Australia; United States	Japan	Allies
Sidi Bou Zid	Tunisian campaign	African Front	1943-02-14	1943-02-17	United States; Free France	(Nazi Germany) Germany	Axis
Kasserine Pass	Tunisian campaign	African Front	1943-02-19	1943-02-24	United States United Kingdom Free France	Germany; Italy	Axis
Kharkov (Third)	Eastern Front		1943-02-19	1943-03-15	Soviet Union; Czechoslovakia	(Nazi Germany) Germany	Axis
Bismarck Sea	New Guinea Campaign	Pacific Front	1943-03-02	1943-03-04	United States Australia	Japan	Allies
The Ruhr (Bombing)	Strategic Bombing	Western Front	1943-03-05	1943-07-31	United Kingdom	Germany	Allies
Medenine	Tunisian campaign	African Front	1943-03-06		United Kingdom; New Zealand; Free France	Germany; Italy	Allies
Mareth Line	Tunisian campaign	African Front	1943-03-16	1943-03-16	United Kingdom; New Zealand; Free France (Kingdom of Greece) Greece	Germany; Italy	Allies
El Guettar	Tunisian campaign	African Front	1943-03-23	1943-04-03	United States	Germany; Italy	Inconclusive
Komandorski Islands	Aleutian Islands campaign	American Front	1943-03-27		United States	Japan	Allies
Soviet submarine campaign (1943)	Baltic Sea campaigns	Eastern Front	1943-04	1943-08	Soviet Union	Germany; Finland	Axis
Operation Flax	Tunisian Campaign	African Front	1943-04-05	1943-04-27	United Kingdom; United States	Germany; Italy	Allies
Cigno Convoy	Mediterranean Front		1943-04-16		United Kingdom	Italy	Axis
Warsaw Ghetto Uprising	Ghetto Uprisings	The Holocaust	1943-04-19	1943-5-16	Jewish resistance	Germany	Axis
Operations Vulcan and Strike	Tunisian Campaign	African Front	1943-04-22	1943-05-6	United Kingdom; United States	Germany; Italy	Allies
Longstop Hill	Tunisian Campaign	African Front	1943-04-22	1943-04-23	United Kingdom; United States	Germany; Italy	Allies
Bombing of Grosseto	Strategic Bombing	Italian Front	1943-04-26		United States	Italy	Inconclusive
Hill 609	Tunisian Campaign	African Front	1943-04-27	1943-05-1	United Kingdom; United States	Germany; Italy	Allies
Operation Checkmate	British Commando operations	Western Front	1943-04-28	1943-05-15	United Kingdom	Germany	Allies
Operation Ramrod 16	Strategic Bombing	Western Front	1943-05-03		(United Kingdom) Royal Air Force (Dominion of New Zealand) New Zealand	Germany	Axis
Campobasso Convoy	Mediterranean Front		1943-05-03	1943-05-04	United Kingdom	Italy	Allies
Operation Retribution	Tunisian Campaign	African Front	1943-05-08	1943-05-13	United Kingdom; United States	GermanyItaly	Allies
Attu	Aleutian Islands campaign	American Front	1943-05-11	1943-05-30	United States; Canada	Japan	Allies
Operation Schwarz	Yugoslavian Front		1943-05-15	1943-06-16	Yugoslav Partisans	Italy; Germany; Croatia; Bulgaria	Inconclusive
Dambusters Raid	Strategic Bombing	Western Front	1943-05-16	1943-05-17	United Kingdom	Germany	Allies
Messina Convoy	Mediterranean Front		1943-06-01	1943-06-02	United Kingdom Greece	Italy	Inconclusive
Operation Corkscrew	Sicily Campaign	Italian Front	1943-06-11		United Kingdom	Italy	Allies
Operation Cartwheel	South West Pacific	Pacific War	1943-06-30	1944-03-20	United States; Australia; New Zealand	Japan	Allies
Kursk	Eastern Front		1943-07-05	1943-08-23	Soviet Union	Germany	Allies
Sicily		Italian Front	1943-07-09	1943-08-17	United States; United Kingdom; Canada; Free France	Italy; Germany	Allies
Operation Ladbroke	Sicily	Italian Front	1943-07-09	1943-07-10	United Kingdom	Italy	Allies
Gela	Sicily	Italian Front, Mediterranean Front	1943-07-10	1943-07-12	United States; United Kingdom	Italy; Germany	Allies
Operation Chestnut	Sicily	Italian Front	1943-07-12		United Kingdom	Italy	Axis
Operation Fustian	Sicily	Italian Front	1943-07-13	1943-07-16	United Kingdom	Italy; Germany	Allies
Operation Scylla	Mediterranean Front		1943-07-17	1943-08-18	United Kingdom	Italy	Axis
Troina	Sicily	Italian Front	1943-07-31	1943-08-06	United States Free France	Germany Italy	Allies
Centuripe	Sicily	Italian Front	1943-08-02	1943-08-04	United Kingdom	Germany	Allies
Smolensk (1943)	Eastern Front		1943-08-07	1943-10-02	Soviet Union	Germany	Allies
Schweinfurt–Regensburg mission	Operation Pointblank	Western Front, Strategic Bombing	1943-08-17		United States; United Kingdom	Germany	Axis
Bombing of Pisa	Strategic Bombing		1943-08-31		United States	Italy	Allies
Invasion of Italy		Italian Front	1943-09-03	1943-09-17	United Kingdom; United States; Canada	Germany; Italy (surrendered)	Allies
Operation Baytown	Invasion of Italy	Italian Front	1943-09-03	1943-09-08	United Kingdom Canada	Germany; Italy	Allies
Battle of Tarvisio	Operation Achse	Italian Front	1943-09-08	1943-09-09	Italian Resistance	Germany	Axis
Operation Achse		Italian Front	1943-09-08	1943-09-23	Italy	Germany Croatia Romania	Axis
German occupation of Rome	Operation Achse	Italian Front	1943-09-08	1943-09-10	Italy	Germany	Axis
Operation Avalanche	Invasion of Italy	Italian Front	1943-09-09	1943-09-17	United Kingdom; United States	Germany	Allies
Operation Slapstick	Invasion of Italy	Italian Front	1943-09-09		United Kingdom	Germany	Allies
Rhodes	Dodecanese Campaign	Mediterranean Front	1943-09-09	1943-09-11	Italy	Germany	Axis
Gran Sasso raid	Italian Front		1943-09-12		Italy	Germany	Axis
Tujak	Slovene Campaign	European Front	1943-09-14	1943-09-19	Slovene Partisans	(Kingdom of Italy) ex-MVACs; Slovene Chetniks	Allies
Operation Source	British Commando operations	Western Front	1943-09-20	1943-09-22	United Kingdom Norway	Germany	Allies
Massacre of the Acqui Division	Operation Achse		1943-09-21	1943-09-26	(Kingdom of Italy) Italy	Germany	Axis
Leros	Dodecanese Campaign	Mediterranean Front	1943-09-26	1943-11-16	(Kingdom of Italy) Italy; United Kingdom	Germany	Axis
Four Days of Naples	Italian Front		1943-09-27	1943-09-30	Italian Resistance	Germany	Allies
Operation Devon	Italian Front		1943-10-03		United Kingdom	Germany	Allies
Kos	Dodecanese Campaign	Mediterranean Front	1943-10-03	1943-10-04	(Kingdom of Italy) Italy; United Kingdom	Germany	Axis
Black Thursday	Operation Pointblank	Western Front	1943-10-14		United States	Germany	Axis
Sept-Îles	Battle of the Atlantic	Western Front	1943-10-22	1943-10-23	United Kingdom	Germany	Axis
Barbara Line	Italian Front		1943-11-01	1943-11-09	United Kingdom; United States	Germany	Allies
Kiev (1943)	Dnieper Campaign	Eastern Front	1943-11-03	1943-11-13	Soviet Union; Czechoslovakia	Germany	Allies
Battle of Berlin (RAF campaign)	Bombing of Berlin	Western Front	1943-11-18	1944-03-31	United Kingdom; United States; Soviet Union; France	Germany	Allies
Tarawa	Gilbert and Marshall Islands campaign	Pacific War	1943-11-20	1943-11-23	United States; United Kingdom	Japan	Allies
Makin	Gilbert and Marshall Islands campaign	Pacific War	1943-11-20	1943-11-24	United States; United Kingdom	Japan	Allies
Bernhardt Line		Italian Campaign	1943-12-01	1944-01-15	United Kingdom; United States; New Zealand; Canada; Free France	Germany	Allies
Air raid on Bari	Italian Campaign	Italian Campaign	1943-12-02		United States; United Kingdom (Kingdom of Italy) Italy	Germany	Axis
Monte la Difensa	Bernhardt Line	Italian Campaign	1943-12-03	1943-12-09	United Kingdom; United States; Canada	Germany	Allies
San Pietro Infine	Italian Campaign	Italian Campaign	1943-12-08	1943-12-17	United States (Kingdom of Italy) Italy	Germany	Allies
Ortona	Italian Campaign	Italian Campaign	1943-12-20	1943-12-28	Canada	Germany	Allies
Operation Hardtack	British Commando operations	Western Front	1943-12-24	1943-12-28	United Kingdom; Free France	Germany	Axis
Bay of Biscay	Battle of the Atlantic	Western Front	1943-12-28		United Kingdom	Germany	Allies

== Battles in 1944 ==
Battle	Campaign	Theatre	Start	End	Allies	Axis	Victory
Monte Cassino		Italian Front	1944-01-17	1944-05-18	United Kingdom; United States; Free France; Poland; Canada; New Zealand; Italy	Germany; Italian Social Republic	Allies
Rapido River	Winter Line	Italian Front	1944-01-20	1944-01-22	United States	Germany	Axis
Baby Blitz	Strategic Bombing	Western Front	1944-01-21	1944-05-29	United Kingdom	Germany	Allies
Anzio	Winter Line	Italian Front	1944-01-22	1944-06-05	United States; United Kingdom; Canada	Germany; Italian Social Republic	Allies
Cisterna	Anzio, Winter Line	Italian Front	1944-01-30	1944-02-02	United States	Germany	Axis
Kwajalein	Gilbert and Marshall Islands	Pacific War	1944-01-31	1944-02-03	United States	Japan	Allies
Admin Box	Burma Campaign	South-East Asian Front	1944-02-05	1944-02-23	United Kingdom	Japan	Allies
Eniwetok	Gilbert and Marshall Islands	Pacific War	1944-02-17	1944-02-23	United States	Japan	Allies
Operation Jericho	French Resistance	Western Front	1944-02-18		United Kingdom; New Zealand; Australia; Free France	Germany	Allies
Big Week	Combined Bomber Offensive	Western Front	1944-02-20	1944-02-25	United Kingdom; United States	Germany	Inconclusive
Bombing of Nijmegen	Big Week, Combined Bomber Offensive	Western Front	1944-02-22		United States	Germany	Allies
Operations Ginny I and II	Italian Front		1944-02-27	1944-03-26	United States	Germany	Axis
Transport Plan	Combined Bomber Offensive	Western Front	1944-03-06	1944-07	United States; United Kingdom	Germany	Allies
Imphal	Burma Campaign	South-East Asian Front, Pacific War	1944-03-08	1944-08-3	United Kingdom	Japan	Allies
Operation Tungsten	Battle of the Atlantic	Western Front	1944-04-03		United Kingdom; Canada	Germany	Allies
Kohima	Burma Campaign	South-East Asian Front, Pacific War	1944-04-04	1944-06-22	United Kingdom; Nepal	Japan	Allies
Central Henan	Operation Ichi-Go	Second Sino-Japanese War, Pacific War	1944-04-19	1944-12-31	China	Japan	Axis
Lyme Bay	Exercise Tiger	Western Front	1944-04-28		United Kingdom; United States	Germany	Axis
Mailly-le-Camp	Western Front		1944-05-03	1944-05-04	United Kingdom	Germany	Allies
Operation Diadem	Winter Line	Italian Front	1944-05-11	1944-06-04	British Empire; United States; France; Poland; Canada	Germany	Allies
Operation Tarbrush	British Commando operations	Western Front	1944-05-15	1944-05-18	United Kingdom; Free France	Germany	Allies
Operation Chesterfield	Winter Line	Italian Front	1944-05-24	1944-05-25	Canada Poland	Germany	Allies
Operation Rösselsprung (1944)	Yugoslavia Campaign	European theatre	1944-05-25	1944-05-27	Yugoslav Partisans	Germany; Croatia; Chetniks	Allies
Changsha	Operation Ichi-Go	Second Sino-Japanese War, Pacific War	1944-05-26	1944-08-08	China	Japan	Axis
Operation Hasty	Italian Front		1944-06-01	1944-06-07	United Kingdom	Germany	Axis
Operation Dingson	French Resistance	Western Front	1944-06-05	1944-06-18	Free France	Germany	Inconclusive
Operation Samwest	Operation Overlord	Western Front	1944-06-05	1944-06-12	Free France	Germany	Axis
Operation Tonga	Operation Overlord	Western Front	1944-06-05	1944-06-06	United Kingdom; Canada	Germany	Allies
Operation Overlord		Western Front	1944-06-05	1944-08-30	United States; United Kingdom; Canada; Free France; Poland	Germany	Allies
Mission Albany	American airborne landings in Normandy, Operation Overlord	Western Front	1944-06-05	1944-06-15	United States	Germany	Allies
Brécourt Manor Assault	American airborne landings in Normandy, Operation Overlord	Western Front	1944-06-06		United States	Germany	Allies
Normandy landings (D-Day)	Operation Overlord	Western Front	1944-06-06		United States; United Kingdom; Canada	Germany	Allies
Omaha Beach	Normandy landings, Operation Overlord	Western Front	1944-06-06		United States	Germany	Allies
Utah Beach	Normandy landings, Operation Overlord	Western Front	1944-06-06		United States	Germany	Allies
Gold Beach	Normandy landings, Operation Overlord	Western Front	1944-06-06		United Kingdom	Germany	Allies
Sword Beach	Normandy landings, Operation Overlord	Western Front	1944-06-06		United Kingdom	Germany	Allies
Juno Beach	Normandy landings, Operation Overlord	Western Front	1944-06-06		CanadaUnited Kingdom	Germany	Allies
Pointe du Hoc	Normandy landings, Operation Overlord	Western Front	1944-06-06		United States; United Kingdom	Germany	Allies
Caen canal and Orne river bridges	Operation Overlord, Operation Tonga	Western Front	1944-06-06		United Kingdom	Germany	Allies
Merville Gun Battery	Operation Overlord, Operation Tonga	Western Front	1944-06-06	1944-06-07	United Kingdom	Germany	Inconclusive
Cherbourg	Operation Overlord	Western Front	1944-06-06	1944-07-27	United States; United Kingdom	Germany	Allies
Operation Bulbasket	Operation Overlord	Western Front	1944-06-06	1944-07-24	United Kingdom	Germany	Allies
Caen	Operation Overlord	Western Front	1944-06-06	1944-08-06	United Kingdom; Canada	Germany	Allies
Bréville	Operation Overlord	Western Front	1944-06-07	1944-06-13	United Kingdom	Germany	Allies
Operation Perch	Battle for Caen, Operation Overlord	Western Front	1944-06-07	1944-06-14	United Kingdom	Germany	Axis
Graignes	American airborne landings in Normandy, Operation Overlord	Western Front	1944-06-10	1944-06-12	United States	Germany	Axis
RAF raid on La Caine	Battle for Caen, Operation Overlord	Western Front	1944-06-10		United Kingdom	Germany	Allies
Le Mesnil-Patry	Battle for Caen, Operation Overlord	Western Front	1944-06-11		Canada	Germany	Axis
Villers-Bocage	Operation Perch, Battle for Caen, Operation Overlord	Western Front	1944-06-13		United Kingdom	Germany	Inconclusive
Odon (Second)	Operation Perch, Battle for Caen, Operation Overlord	Western Front	1944-07-15	1944-07-17	United Kingdom	Germany	Allies
Nietjärvi	Continuation War	Eastern Front	1944-07-15	1944-07-17	Soviet Union	Finland	Axis
Operation Mascot	Battle of the Atlantic	Western Front	1944-07-17		United Kingdom	Germany	Axis
Operation Goodwood	Battle for Caen, Operation Overlord	Western Front	1944-07-18	1944-07-20	United Kingdom	Germany	Inconclusive
Operation Atlantic	Battle for Caen, Operation Overlord	Western Front	1944-07-18	1944-07-20	Canada	Germany	Inconclusive
Verrières Ridge	Battle for Caen, Operation Overlord	Western Front	1944-07-19	1944-07-25	Canada	Germany	Axis
Saipan	Mariana and Palau Islands campaign	Pacific War	1944-06-15	1944-07-09	United States	Japan	Allies
Guam (1944)	Mariana and Palau Islands campaign	Pacific War	1944-07-21	1944-08-10	United States	Japan	Allies
Tinian	Mariana and Palau Islands campaign	Pacific War	1944-07-24	1944-08-01	United States	Japan	Allies
Bombardment of Cherbourg	Operation Overlord	Western Front	1944-07-25		United States; United Kingdom	Germany	Allies
Operation Spring	Battle for Caen, Operation Overlord	Western Front	1944-07-25	1944-07-27	Canada United Kingdom	Germany	Axis
Gothic Line		Italian Front	1944-07-25	1945-03	United Kingdom; United States; Canada; Poland; Italy; New Zealand	Germany; Italian Social Republic	Inconclusive
Ilomantsi (1944)	Continuation War	Eastern Front	1944-07-26	1944-08-13	Soviet Union	Finland	Axis
Operation Hokki	Continuation War	Eastern Front	1944-07-31	1944-08-31	Soviet Union	Finland	Axis
Warsaw Uprising	Operation Tempest	Eastern Front	1944-08-01	1944-10-02	Polish Underground State; Polish Army in the East	Germany	Axis
Gemmano	Gothic Line	Italian Front	1944-08-04	1944-08-15	United Kingdom	Germany	Allies
Operation Loyton	Western Front		1944-08-12	1944-10-09	United Kingdom	Germany	Inconclusive
Operation Dragoon		Western Front	1944-08-15	1944-10-14	United States; France	Germany	Allies
Guilin–Liuzhou	Operation Ichi-Go	Second Sino-Japanese War, Pacific War	1944-08-16	1944-11-24	China; United States	Japan	Axis
Operation Goodwood (naval)	Battle of the Atlantic	Western Front	1944-08-22	1944-08-29	United Kingdom	Germany	Axis
Mairy	Siegfried Line campaign	Western Front	1944-09-07	1944-09-08	United States	Germany	Allies
Aachen	Siegfried Line campaign	Western Front	1944-09-12	1944-10-21	United States	Germany	Allies
Dompaire	Lorraine campaign	Western Front	1944-09-12	1944-09-13	United States; France	Germany	Allies
Rimini (1944)	Gothic Line Offensive	Italian Campaign	1944-09-13	1944-09-21	Canada; Greece; New Zealand	Germany	Allies
Operation Paravane	Battle of the Atlantic	Western Front	1944-09-15		United Kingdom	Germany	Allies
Peleliu	Mariana and Palau Islands campaign	Pacific War	1944-09-15	1944-11-27	United States	Japan	Allies
Angaur	Mariana and Palau Islands campaign	Pacific War	1944-09-17	1944-10-22	United States	Japan	Allies
Arnhem	Siegfried Line campaign	Western Front	1944-09-17	1944-09-26	United Kingdom; Poland	Germany	Axis
San Marino	Gothic Line Offensive	Italian Campaign	1944-09-17	1944-09-20	United Kingdom	Germany	Allies
Hürtgen Forest	Siegfried Line campaign	Western Front	1944-09-19	1944-12-16	United States	Germany	Axis
Monte Battaglia	Italian Campaign		1944-09-24	1944-10-11	United States; United Kingdom; Brigate Garibaldi	Germany; Italian Social Republic	Allies
Soviet submarine campaign (1944)	Baltic Sea campaigns	Eastern Front	1944-10	1944-12	Soviet Union	Germany	Allies
Scheldt	Siegfried Line campaign	Western Front	1944-10-02	1944-11-08	Canada; United Kingdom	Germany	Allies
Debrecen	Eastern Front		1944-10-06	1944-10-29	Soviet Union; Romania	Germany (Kingdom of Hungary (1920–1946)) Hungary	Inconclusive
Crucifix Hill	Siegfried Line campaign	Western Front	1944-10-08		United States	Germany	Allies
Leyte	Philippines campaign (1944–1945)	Pacific War	1944-10-17	1944-12-26	United States; Australia	Japan	Allies
Leyte Gulf	Philippines campaign (1944–1945)	Pacific War	1944-10-23	1944-10-26	United States; Australia	Japan	Allies
Operation Obviate	Battle of the Atlantic	Western Front	1944-10-29		United Kingdom	Germany	Inconclusive
Vianden Castle	Luxembourg Resistance	Western Front	1944-11-15	1944-11-19	Luxembourg Resistance	Germany	Allies
Operation Queen	Siegfried Line campaign	Western Front	1944-11-16	1944-12-16	United States	Germany	Axis
Monte Castello	Gothic Line Offensive	Italian Front	1944-11-25	1944-12-12	Brazil; United States	Germany	Allies
Mindoro	Philippines campaign (1944–1945)	Pacific War	1944-12-13	1944-12-16	United States	Japan	Allies
The Bulge	Western Front		1944-12-16	1945-01-28	United States; United Kingdom; Canada; Belgium	Germany	Allies
Garfagnana	Gothic Line Offensive	Italian Front	1944-12-26	1944-12-28	United States; British Empire; Italian Resistance	Italian Social Republic; Germany	Axis

== Battles in 1945 ==
Battle	Campaign	Theatre	Start	End	Allies	Axis	Victory
Soviet naval campaign (1945)	Baltic Sea campaigns	Eastern Front	1945-01	1945-05-09	Soviet Union	Germany	Allies
Meiktila and Mandalay	Burma Campaign	Pacific War	1945-01	1945-03	United Kingdom	Japan	Allies
Luzon	Philippines campaign (1944–1945)	Pacific War	1945-01-09	1945-08-15	United States (Philippines) Philippine resistance Australia; Mexico	Japan	Allies
Kapelsche Veer	Western Front		1945-01-26	1945-01-31	Canada	Germany	Allies
Raid at Cabanatuan	Philippines campaign (1944–1945)	Pacific War	1945-01-30		United States (Philippines) Philippine resistance	Japan	Allies
Bataan (1945)	Philippines campaign (1944–1945)	Pacific War	1945-01-31	1945-02-21	United States (Philippines) Philippine resistance	Japan	Allies
Manila	Philippines campaign (1944–1945)	Pacific War	1945-02-03	1945-03-03	United States (Philippines) Philippine resistance	Japan	Allies
Operation Solstice	Eastern Front		1945-02-15	1945-02-18	Soviet Union	Germany	Allies
Corregidor (1945)	Philippines campaign (1944–1945)	Pacific War	1945-02-16	1945-02-26	United States	Japan	Allies
Operation Encore	Gothic Line	Italian Campaign	1945-02-18	1945-03-05	United States; Brazil	Germany	Allies
Iwo Jima	Volcano and Ryukyu Islands campaign	Pacific War	1945-02-19	1945-03-26	United States	Japan	Allies
Los Baños	Philippines campaign (1944–1945)	Pacific War	1945-02-23		United States (Philippines) Philippine resistance	Japan	Allies
Operation Spring Awakening	Eastern Front		1945-03-06	1945-03-15	Soviet Union; Bulgaria; Yugoslav Partisans	Germany; Hungary	Allies
Mindanao	Philippines campaign (1944–1945)	Pacific War	1945-03-10	1945-08-15	United States (Philippines) Philippine resistance	Japan	Allies
Ligurian Sea	Mediterranean Front		1945-03-18		United Kingdom	Germany	Allies
Visayas	Philippines campaign (1944–1945)	Pacific War	1945-03-18	1945-08-15	United States (Philippines) Philippine resistance	Japan	Allies
West Henan–North Hubei	Second Sino-Japanese War	Pacific War	1945-03-21	1945-05-11	(Republic of China (1912–1949)) China	Japan	Inconclusive
Operation Varsity	Operation Plunder	Western Front	1945-03-24		United States; United Kingdom; Canada	Germany	Allies
Operation Roast	Spring 1945 offensive in Italy	Italian Campaign	1945-04-01	1945-04-02	United Kingdom	Germany	Allies
Okinawa	Volcano and Ryukyu Islands campaign	Pacific War	1945-04-01	1945-06-22	United States	Japan	Allies
West Hunan	Second Sino-Japanese War	Pacific War	1945-04-06	1945-06-07	(Republic of China (1912–1949)) China	Japan	Allies
Bologna	Spring 1945 offensive in Italy	Italian Campaign	1945-04-09	1945-04-21	Poland; United Kingdom; United States; Italy (Vargas Era) Brazil	Germany	Allies
Argenta Gap	Spring 1945 offensive in Italy	Italian Campaign	1945-04-12	1945-04-19	United Kingdom	Germany	Allies
Groningen	North West Europe campaign	Western Front	1945-04-13	1945-04-16	Canada; Netherlands	Germany	Allies
Montese	Spring 1945 offensive in Italy	Italian Campaign	1945-04-14	1945-04-17	(Vargas Era) Brazil; United States	Germany	Allies
Otterlo	North West Europe campaign	Western Front	1945-04-16	1945-04-17	Canada; United Kingdom	Germany	Allies
Berlin		Eastern Front	1945-04-16	1945-05-02	Soviet Union	Germany	Allies
Hamburg	Western Allied invasion of Germany	Western Front	1945-04-18	1945-05-03	United Kingdom; Newfoundland	Germany	Allies
Operation Herring	Spring 1945 offensive in Italy	Italian Campaign	1945-04-19	1945-04-23	(Kingdom of Italy) Italy; United Kingdom; United States	Germany	Allies
Odžak	End of World War II in Europe	Eastern Front	1945-04-19	1945-05-25	Yugoslavia	Croatia	Allies
Halbe	Battle of Berlin	Eastern Front	1945-04-24	1945-05-01	Soviet Union	Germany	Allies
Collecchio	Spring 1945 offensive in Italy, Italian Civil War	Italian Campaign	1945-04-26	1945-04-29	(Vargas Era) Brazil; Italian partisans United States	Germany; Italian Social Republic	Allies
Trieste	Spring 1945 offensive in Italy, World War II in Yugoslavia	Italian Campaign, Eastern Front	1945-04-30	1945-05-02	Yugoslavia; New Zealand; Italian Resistance	Germany; Italian Social Republic; Chetniks	Allies
Tarakan	Pacific War		1945-05-01	1945-06-21	Australia; United States; Netherlands	Japan	Allies
Castle Itter	End of World War II in Europe	Western Front	1945-05-05		United States; Austrian resistance	Germany	Allies
Prague	End of World War II in Europe	Eastern Front	1945-05-06	1945-05-11	Soviet Union; Romania; Czechoslovakia; Poland; Russian Liberation Army	Germany; Hungary; Slovakia	Allies
Poljana	End of World War II in Europe	Eastern Front	1945-05-14	1945-05-15	Yugoslavia	Germany; Croatia; Slovene Home Guard; Chetniks	Allies
North Borneo	Pacific War		1945-06-10	1945-08-15	Australia; United States	Japan	Allies
Balikpapan	Pacific War		1945-07-01	1945-07-21	Australia; United States; Netherlands; United Kingdom	Japan	Allies
Manchuria	Soviet–Japanese War	Pacific War	1945-08-08	1945-09-02	Soviet Union; Mongolia	Japan	Allies

== African Front ==
- North African campaign: June 1940 – May 1943
  - Western Desert campaign: June 1940 – February 1943
    - Italian invasion of Egypt September 1940
    - Operation Compass December 1940 – February 1941
      - Battle of Nibeiwa December 1940
      - Battle of Sidi Barrani December 1940
      - Siege of Giarabub December 1940 – March 1941
      - British capture of Tobruk January 1941
      - Battle of Bardia January 1941
      - Battle of Mechili January 1941
      - Capture of Kufra January–March 1941
      - Battle of Beda Fomm February 1941
    - Operation Sonnenblume February–May 1941
    - Siege of Tobruk April–November 1941
      - Bardia raid April 1941
      - Operation Brevity May 1941
      - Operation Skorpion May 1941
      - Operation Battleaxe June 1941
      - Twin Pimples raid July 1941
    - Operation Crusader November–December 1941
      - First Battle of Bir el Gubi November 1941
      - Operation Flipper November 1941
      - Battle of Point 175 November–December 1941
      - Second Battle of Bir el Gubi December 1941
    - Battle of Gazala: May–June 1942
      - Operation Venezia May 1942
      - Operation Salam
      - Battle of Bir Hakeim: May–June 1942
      - Axis capture of Tobruk June 1942
    - Battle of Mersa Matruh June 1942
    - First Battle of El Alamein: July 1942
    - Battle of Alam el Halfa: August–September 1942
    - Operation Agreement September 1942
      - Operation Nicety
      - Operation Bigamy
      - Operation Caravan
    - Second Battle of El Alamein: October–November 1942
    - Battle of El Agheila: December 1942
    - Battle of Tripoli (1943)
  - Operation Torch: November 1942
    - Operation Terminal November 1942
    - Naval Battle of Casablanca November 1942
  - Tunisia Campaign: November 1942 – May 1943
    - Battle of the Kasserine Pass: February 1943
    - Battle of Sidi Bou Zid: February 1943
    - Battle of Medenine: March 1943
    - Battle of the Mareth Line: March 1943
    - Battle of El Guettar: March–April 1943
    - Operation Flax: April 1943
    - Operation Vulcan: May 1943
      - Battle of Longstop Hill (1943): April 1943
      - Battle of Hill 609: April–May 1943
    - Operation Retribution: May 1943
    - Operation Strike: May 1943
- East African campaign June 1940 - November 1941
  - Northern front, East Africa, 1940
  - Italian invasion of British Somaliland August 1940
    - Battle of Tug Argan August 1940
  - Battle of Agordat (1941)
  - Battle of Keren february - march 1941
  - Operation Appearance march - april 1941
  - Battle of Amba Alagi (1941)
  - Battle of Culqualber August - November 1941
  - Siege of Saïo March - July 1941
  - Battle of Gondar November 1941
- West Africa campaign September - November 1940
  - Battle of Dakar September 1940
  - Battle of Gabon November 1940

== Mediterranean Front ==
- Battle of the Mediterranean Sea: June 1940–May 1945.
  - Battle of the Espero Convoy
  - Attack on Mers-el-Kébir
  - Battle of Calabria
  - Battle of Cape Spada
  - Battle of Cape Passero (1940)
  - Battle of Taranto
  - Siege of Malta
  - Battle of Cape Spartivento
  - Operation Excess
  - Raid on Souda Bay
  - Battle of Cape Matapan
  - Battle of the Tarigo Convoy
  - Operation Substance
  - Operation Halberd
  - Battle of the Duisburg Convoy
  - Battle of Cape Bon (1941)
  - First Battle of Sirte
  - Raid on Alexandria (1941)
  - Second Battle of Sirte
  - Operation Vigorous
  - Operation Pedestal
  - Battle of Skerki Bank
  - Raid on Algiers
  - Battle of the Cigno Convoy
  - Battle of the Campobasso Convoy
  - Battle of the Messina Convoy
  - Operation Scylla
  - Battle of the Ligurian Sea
- Siege of Malta: June 1940 – December 1942
- Balkan campaign: October 1940 – June 1941
  - Italian Invasion of Greece: October 1940 – April 1941
      - Battle of Pindus
      - Battle of Elaia–Kalamas
      - Battle of Morava–Ivan
        - Battle of Korytsa
      - Battle of Saranda
      - Battle of Himara
      - Capture of Klisura Pass
      - Italian Spring Offensive
        - Battle of Hill 731
  - Anglo-Iraqi War: April – May 1941
        - Farhud
  - Axis invasion of Yugoslavia: April 1941
      - Operation Retribution (1941)
      - Hungarian Offensive
      - Battle for Belgrade
      - Yugoslav-Albania Front
  - German invasion of Greece: April 1941
      - Battle of the Metaxas Line
      - Battle of Vevi (1941)
      - Battle of Ptolemaida
      - Battle of Kleisoura Pass
      - Battle of Lake Kastoria
      - Battle of Tempe Gorge
      - Battle of Athens (1941)
      - Battle of Thermopylae (1941)
      - Battle of Crete: May 1941
        - Battle of Rethymno
        - Battle of 42nd Street
  - Syria–Lebanon campaign: June – July 1941
    - Battle of the Litani River
    - Battle of Jezzine (1941)
    - Battle of Sidon (1941)
    - Battle of Kissoué
    - Battle of Damascus (1941)
    - Battle of Merdjayoun
    - Battle of Palmyra (1941)
    - Battle of Deir ez-Zor (1941)
    - Battle of Damour
    - Battle of Beirut (1941)
  - Anglo-Soviet invasion of Iran: August 1941
- Operation Agreement: September 1942
- Operation Strangle: March 1943 – June 1944
- Dodecanese Campaign: September–October 1943
  - Battle of Leros
  - Battle of Kos
  - Battle of Rhodes
- Bombing of Grosseto in World War II
- Operation Corkscrew
- Allied invasion of Sicily: July–August 1943
  - Operation Ladbroke
  - Operation Fustian
  - Operation Chestnut
  - Battle of Gela (1943)
  - Operation Narcissus
  - Battle of Centuripe
  - Battle of Troina
  - Gran Sasso raid
  - Operation Slapstick
  - Operation Lehrgang
  - Operation Baytown
- Bombing of Pisa in World War II August 1943
- Allied invasion of Italy: September 1943
- Operation Avalanche September 1943
- Operation Achse September 1943
  - German occupation of Rome
- Battle of Naples: September 1943
- Volturno Line: October–November 1943
- Operation Devon
- Barbara Line: October–November 1943
- Air Raid on Bari: December 1943
- Battle of San Pietro Infine: December 1943
- Battle of Monte la Difensa: December 1943
- Battle of Ortona: December 1943
- Bernhardt Line: December 1943 – January 1944
- Moro River Campaign: December 1943
- Battle of Rapido River January 1944
- Battle of Monte Cassino: January–May 1944
  - Operation Diadem: January 1944
- Operation Carpetbagger: January 1944
- Battle of Cisterna January 1944
- Operation Chettyford: January 1944
- Operations Ginny I and II February–March 1944
- Operation Strangle March–May 1944
- Battle of Anzio: January–June 1944
  - Battle of Cisterna
- Invasion of Elba: June 1944
- Operation Hasty: June 1944
- Trasimene Line: June–July 1944
- Battle of Ancona: June–July 1944
- Hitler Line May 1944
  - Senger line
  - Operation Chesterfield
  - Operation Dora
- Caesar C line May 1944
- Roman switch line May 1944
- Gothic Line: August–December 1944
  - Green Line (Italy)
  - Battle of Gemmano
  - Battle of Rimini
- Battle of San Marino: September 1944
- Battle of Monte Battaglia: September-October 1944
- Battle of Garfagnana: December 1944
- Battle of Monte Castello: November 1944 – February 1945
- Operation Encore : February-March 1945
- Spring 1945 offensive in Italy: April–May 1945
  - Operation Encore
  - Operation Bowler
  - Operation Roast
  - Battle of Bologna:
  - Battle of the Argenta Gap:
  - Battle of Montese
  - Operation Buckleland
  - Operation Herring
  - Battle of Collecchio:

== Western Front ==
- French offensive into Germany: September 1939
  - Phoney War
- Operation Weserübung: April–June 1940
  - German Invasion of Denmark
  - German invasion of Norway
    - Battles of Narvik
    - Operation Juno
    - Operation Alphabet
    - Action in the Oslofjord
    - Action off Lofoten
    - Capture of Egersund
    - Capture of Arendal
    - Battle of Drøbak Sound
    - Battle of Midtskogen
    - Battle of Dombås
    - Battle of Hegra Fortress
    - Åndalsnes landings
    - Battle of Gratangen
    - Battle of Høljarast Bridge
    - Battle for Kvam
    - Namsos campaign
    - Battle of Vinjesvingen
- Battle of the Netherlands: May 1940
  - Battle for The Hague
  - Battle of Rotterdam
  - Battle of Mill
  - Battle of Maastricht
  - Battle of Zeeland
  - Battle of the Grebbeberg
  - Battle of the Afsluitdijk
  - Rotterdam Blitz
- Battle of Belgium: May 1940
  - Battle of Fort Eben-Emael
  - Operation David
  - Battle of Hannut
  - Battle of Gembloux
  - Battle of the Ypres–Comines Canal
  - Battle of the Lys
- German invasion of Luxembourg: May 1940
- Battle of France: May–June 1940
  - Battle of Sedan
  - Battle of Montcornet
  - Operation Cycle
  - Battle of Arras
  - Battle of Boulogne
  - Siege of Calais
  - Battle of Abbeville
  - Siege of Lille
  - German bombing of Paris
  - Battle of Dunkirk
    - Dunkirk evacuation
  - Battle of Lagarde
  - Battle of Saumur
- Italian invasion of France: June 1940
- Battle of Britain: July–October 1940
  - Kanalkampf
  - Adlertag
  - The Hardest Day
  - Battle of Britain Day
  - Battle of Graveney Marsh
- Operation Felix: June – August 1940
- Aerial incidents in Switzerland in World War II (1940–1945)
- The Blitz: September 1940 – May 1941
- British Commando operations during the Second World War
  - Operation Collar (commando raid)
  - Operation Ambassador
  - Operation Chess
  - Operation Gauntlet
  - Operation Acid Drop
  - Operation Claymore
  - Operation Archery
  - Operation Anklet
  - Operation Chopper (commando raid)
  - Operation Deep Cut
  - Operation Astrakan
  - Operation Sunstar
  - Operation Curlew
  - Operation Biting
  - Operation Myrmidon
  - Operation J V
  - Operation Abercrombie
  - Operation Bristle
  - Operation Barricade
  - Operation Dryad
  - Operation Branford
  - Operation Aquatint
  - Operation Musketoon
  - Operation Basalt
  - Operation Fahrenheit
  - Operation Batman
  - Operation Source
  - Operation Freshman
  - Operation Frankton
  - Operation Cartoon
  - Operation Crackers
  - Operation Huckaback
  - Operation Brandy
  - Operation Roundabout
  - Operation Checkmate (commando raid)
  - Operation Forfar
  - Operation Hardtack (commando raid)
  - Operation Tarbrush
  - Operation Rumford
  - Operation Gearbox
  - Operation Gearbox II
  - Operation Sportpalast
  - Operation Title
- Channel Dash: February 1942
- Operation Donnerkeil: February 1942
- St. Nazaire Raid: March 1942
- Operation Sportpalast March 1942
- Augsburg raid: April 1942
- Dieppe Raid: August 1942
- Oslo Mosquito Raid (1942) September 1942
- Operation Robinson October 1942
- Case Anton November 1942
- Operation Oyster December 1942
- Operation Ramrod 16 May 1943
- Battle of Hamburg (air)
- Battle of the Ruhr
- Operation Chastise May 1943
- Schweinfurt–Regensburg mission August 1943
- Battle of Isefjord August 1943
- Battle of Sept-Îles October 1943
- Second Schweinfurt raid Oktober 1943
- Battle of Berlin (air): November 1943 – March 1944
- Battle of the Bay of Biscay December 1943
- Operation Bodyguard: December 1943 – June 1944
- Operation Fortitude March – June 1944
- Operation Ironside
- Operation Ironside II
- Operation Royal Flush
- Operation Graffham
- Operation Zeppelin (deception plan)
  - Vendetta
  - Turpitude
- Operation Copperhead
- Operation Ferdinand
- Operation Titanic
- D-Day naval deceptions
  - Glimmer and Taxable
  - Big Drum
- Operation Steinbock January – May 1944
- Operation Jericho February 1944
- Operation Argument February 1944
  - Bombing of Nijmegen
- Operation Tungsten April 1944*
- Exercise Tiger
  - Battle of Lyme Bay
- Exercise Fabius
- Western Allied invasion of France: June 1944–March 1945
  - Operation Overlord: June–August 1944
- Mission Boston
- Mission Detroit
- Mission Chicago
- Mission Albany
- Mission Elmira
- Mission Hackensack
- Brécourt Manor Assault
- Operation Bulbasket
- H-Hour (D-Day)
- Operation Gambit
- Battle of Merville Gun Battery
- Battle of Graignes
- Mulberry harbours
- Operation Loyton
- Operation Samwest
- Operation Tonga
  - Normandy landings
    - Omaha Beach
    - Gold Beach
    - Sword Beach
    - Utah Beach
    - Juno Beach
    - Pointe du Hoc
- Bombing of Normandy
- Battle of Port-en-Bessin
- Operation Defoe
- Operation Dingson
- Battle of Douvres Radar Station
- Operation Accumulator
- Battle for Caen
  - Operation Perch
  - Battle of Villers-Bocage
  - Operation Epsom
  - Battle of Le Mesnil-Patry
  - Operation Martlet
  - RAF raid on La Caine (1944)
  - Operation Windsor
  - Capture of the Caen canal and Orne river bridges
  - Operation Charnwood
  - Operation Jupiter
  - Second Battle of the Odon
  - Operation Goodwood
  - Operation Goodwood (naval)
  - Operation Atlantic
  - Battle of Verrières Ridge
  - Operation Spring
- Operation Foxley
- Operation Guidance
- Operation Postage Able
- Operation Paravane
- Operation Mascot
- Battle of Mairy
- Operation Obviate
- Bombardment of Mailly-le-Camp
- Battle of Cherbourg
  - Bombardment of Cherbourg
- Operation Lost
- Battle of Dompaire
- Battle of Bréville
- Operation Jedburgh
- Operation Dunhill
- Operation Maple
- Transport Plan
  - Battle of Carentan
    - Battle of Bloody Gulch
  - Battle of Saint-Lô
  - Operation Cobra
  - Operation Lüttich
  - Operation Totalize
    - Battle for Hill 140
  - Falaise Pocket
  - Operation Tractable
    - Battle of Hill 262
  - Battle of Chambois
  - Liberation of Paris
  - French Resistance
    - Battle of Vercors
    - Maquis du Mont Mouchet
    - Maquis des Glières
  - Operation Valkyrie: July 1944
- Operation Houndsworth
- Shootdown of Wald Avro
- Shootdown of Hochdahl-Trills
- Shootdown of Douglas DC-3
- Operation Haft
- Battle for Brittany
  - Battle of Pierres Noires
  - Battle of Saint-Malo
  - Battle for Brest
  - Battle of Audierne Bay
  - Operation Chastity
  - Liberation of Rennes
- Operation Mallard
- Operation Frantic
- Operation Cooney
- Battle of Ushant (1944)
- Operation Bluecoat
- Operation Dragoon: August–September 1944
    - Battle of Marseille
    - Mission Dove
    - Operation Romeo
    - Battle of Port Cros
    - Operation Rugby
    - Operation Span
    - Battle of La Ciotat
    - Battle of Toulon (1944)
- Allied advance from Paris to the Rhine: August 1944 – March 1945
- Clearing the Channel Coast: September–November 1944
  - Operation Astonia
  - Siege of Dunkirk (1944)
  - Operation Wellhit
  - Operation Undergo
- Operation Catechism
- Operation Pheasant
  - Operation Colin
  - Operation Alan – Battle of 's-Hertogenbosch
  - Operation Rebound – Roosendaal to Willemstad
  - Battle of the Scheldt
    - Operation Switchback
    - Operation Vitality
    - Operation Infatuate
    - Inundation of Walcheren
    - Battle of Walcheren Causeway
    - Operation Infatuate I
    - Operation Infatuate II
- Royan pocket
- Lorraine Campaign: September–December 1944
  - Battle of the Vosges (1944)
  - Breskens Pocket
  - Battle of Alsace
    - Operation Pistol
    - Battle of Nancy
    - Battle of Metz
    - Battle of Arracourt
    - Liberation of Strasbourg
- Battle of Vianden
- Operation Market Garden: September 1944
  - Battle of Arnhem
    - Evacuation of Arnhem
    - Operation Pegasus
  - Operation Berlin (Arnhem)
  - Battle of Nijmegen
  - Battle of the Nijmegen salient
- Operation Hands Up
- Operation Marathon (World War II)
- Siege of Rochelle
- Operations Wallace and Hardy
- Battle of La Haye-du-Puits
- 6th Airborne Division advance to the River Seine/
- Liberation of Belgium
  - Battle of the Mons pocket
  - Battle of Geel
  - Battle of Moerbrugge: September 1944
- Saint-Nazaire pocket
- Battle of Fort Driant September–October 1944
- Battle of Aachen: September–October 1944
  - Battle of Crucifix Hill
- Battle of Overloon: September–October 1944
- Operation Kipling
- Battle of Hürtgen Forest: September–December 1944
  - Operation Queen
- Aarhus Air Raid October 1944
- Operation Hurricane (1944) October 1944
- Operation Tigerfish: November 1944
- Operation Provident
- Putten raid
- Battle of Broekhuizen
- Operation Clipper: November 1944
- Battle of Vianden: November 1944
- Battle of Kesternich: December 1944 – February 1945
- Battle of the Bulge: December 1944 – January 1945
  - Battle of Elsenborn Ridge
    - Losheim Gap
    - Battle of Lanzerath Ridge
  - Battle of Clervaux
  - Siege of Bastogne
  - Battle of Bure
  - Battle of Heartbreak Crossroads
  - Operation Stösser
  - Operation Zahnarzt
  - Operation Grief
  - Battle of St. Vith
  - Operation Bodenplatte
  - Oslo Mosquito Raid (1944)
- Second Battle of the Alps
  - Defense of the Redoute Ruinée (1945) December 1944 - April 1945
- Operation Nordwind: December 1944 - January 1945
- Colmar Pocket
- Operation Woodlark
- Operasjon Rype
- Operation Blackcock: January 1945
- Battle for the Kapelsche Veer: January 1945
- Operation Veritable: February 1945
- Operation Grenade: February 1945

Operation Blockbuster

- Black Friday (1945)
- Operation Lumberjack
  - Battle of Remagen
- Operation Carthage March 1945
- Granville Raid
- Western Allied invasion of Germany: March–May 1945
  - Operation Undertone
  - Operation Plunder
  - Battle of Frankfurt
  - Operation Varsity
  - Battle of Cologne (1945)
  - Operation Gisela
  - Battle of Heilbronn (1945)
  - Battle of Kassel (1945)
  - Battle of Paderborn (1945)
  - Rhineland Offensive
  - Task Force Baum
  - Battle of Aschaffenburg (1945)
  - Ruhr Pocket
  - Battle of Kassel
  - Battle of Heilbronn
  - Operation Amherst
  - Battle of Würzburg (1945)
  - Battle of Nuremberg
  - Task Force Baum
  - Operation Cowboy
  - Battle of Hamburg
  - Battle of Castle Itter
- Battle of Mont-Cenis
- Battle of Authion
- Georgian uprising on Texel
- Liberation of Arnhem
- Operation Doomsday
- Dachau Uprising
- Operation Judgement (1945) May 1945
- Battle of Groningen
- Battle of Otterlo

Operation Blackout

== Atlantic Ocean ==
- Battle of the Atlantic: 1939–1945
  - First Happy Time
  - Battle of the River Plate
  - Altmark Incident
  - Operation Wikinger
  - Convoy SC 7
  - Convoy HX 84
  - Operation Donnerkeil
  - Operation Berlin
  - Action of 4 April 1941
  - Action of 9 May 1941
  - Battle of the Denmark Strait
  - Action in Tarrafal Bay
  - Operation Drumbeat
  - Battle of the Caribbean
    - Attack on Aruba
    - Operation Neuland
    - Bombardment of Curaçao
  - Battle of Torpedo Alley
  - Action of 27 March 1942
  - Battle of the St. Lawrence
  - Action of 6 June 1942
  - Convoy PQ 17
  - Naval Battle of Casablanca
  - Battle of the Barents Sea
  - Convoy RS 3
  - Black May (World War II)
  - Battle of Sept-Îles
  - Battle of the North Cape
  - Operation Stonewall
    - Battle of the Bay of Biscay
  - Operation Teardrop
  - Battle of Ushant
  - Battle of Pierres Noires
  - Action of 9 February 1945
  - Sinking of U-864
  - Battle of Point Judith
  - Actions of 5–6 May 1945
  - Actions of 7–8 May 1945

== Eastern Front ==
- German Invasion of Poland September–October 1939
- Bombing of Wieluń
  - Battle of Westerplatte
  - Battle of Mokra
- Battle of Danzig Bay
- Battle of Lasy Królewskie
- Defence of the Polish Post Office in Danzig
  - Battle of Kałuszyn
  - Battle of Łomża (1939)
  - Battle of Kampinos Forest
  - Defense of Katowice
  - Battle of Kępa Oksywska
  - Battle of Kobryń
  - Defense of Ochota and Wola (1939)
- OUN Uprising of 1939
  - Battle of Mlawa
- Battle of the Border
- Battle of Boratycze
- Battle of Węgierska Górka
- Battle of Tomaszów Mazowiecki
- Battle of Różan
- Battle of Radom
- Battle of Pszczyna
- Battle of Przemyśl (1939)
- Battle of Piotrków Trybunalski
- Battle of Mikołów
- Battle of Krasnystaw
- Battle of Kobryń
- Battle of Kępa Oksywska
- Battle of Jaworów
- Worek Plan
- Battle of Jarosław
- Battle of Grudziądz
- Battle of Gdynia
- Raid on Fraustadt
- Battle of Częstochowa (1939)
- Battle of Brześć Litewski
- Battle of Pułtusk (1939)
- Battle of Barak
- Battle of Slater's Knoll
- Battle of Cześniki
- Peking Plan
- Battle of Gdynia
  - Battle of Tuchola Forest
  - Battle of Jordanów
  - Battle of Modlin
- Battle of Wola Cyrusowa
- Battle of Wólka Węglowa
  - Battle of Borowa Góra
  - Battle of Grudziądz
  - Battle of Wizna
- Battle of Krasnystaw
- Charge at Krojanty
  - Battle of Radom
  - Battle of Piotrków Trybunalski
  - Battle of Hel
  - Battle of Łomianki
  - Battle of Łomża (1939)
  - Battle of the Bzura
  - Siege of Warsaw
  - Battle of Lwów
  - Battle of Tomaszów Lubelski
  - Battle of Krasnobród
  - Battle of Kock
- Soviet invasion of Poland: September–October 1939
  - Battle of Wilno
  - Battle of Grodno
  - Skidel revolt
  - Battle of Kodziowce
  - Battles of Parczew, Jabłoń and Milanów
  - Battle of Husynne
  - Battle of Wladypol
  - Battle of Szack
  - Battle of Wytyczno
- Orzeł incident
- Winter war: November 1939 – March 1940
  - Battle of Suomussalmi
  - Battle of Summa
  - Battle of Ilomantsi (1939)
  - Battle of Raate Road
  - Battle of Kollaa
  - Battle of Tolvajärvi
  - Battle of Taipale
  - Battle of Honkaniemi
  - Battle of Varolampi Pond
  - Battle of Petsamo
  - Battle of Kelja
  - Battle of Kuhmo
  - Battle of Vyborg Bay (1940)
  - Salla
- Soviet occupation of Bessarabia and Northern Bukovina
- Masļenki border incident
- Skirmish at Diosig
- Axis invasion of the Soviet Union (Operation Barbarossa) June–December 1941
  - Defense of Brest Fortress June 1941
  - Siege of Mogilev
  - Battle of Lwów (1941)
  - Danube Delta Campaign
  - Battle of Białystok-Minsk June 1941
  - Operation Rentier
  - Raid on Constanța
  - Baltic Operation
  - Action of 26 June 1941
  - Battle of Raseiniai
  - Soviet Navy surface raids in the western Black Sea
  - Bombing of Kassa
  - Battle of Brody June 1941
  - Continuation War
    - Battle of Karelian Isthmus
    - Battle of Ladoga Karelia
    - Battle of East Karelia
    - Battle of Vyborg (1941)
    - Battle of Porlampi
    - Battle of Lypovec
    - Finnish invasion of East Karelia (1941)
    - Operation Silver Fox
    - Operation Platinum Fox
    - Operation Arctic Fox July–November 1941
    - Battle of Bengtskär
    - Operation EF (1941) July 1941
  - Battle of Smolensk (1941)
  - Bombing of Gorky in World War II
  - Battle of Uman
  - Battles of Spadshchansky forest
  - Operation Northwind (1941)
  - Attack on Riga (1941)
  - Siege of Odessa (1941)
  - Action of 9 July 1941
  - Battle of Kiev (1941)
  - Operation München
  - Bombing of Tallinn in World War II
  - Bombing of Narva in World War II
  - Operation Beowulf
  - Gulf of Riga campaign
  - June Uprising in Lithuania
  - Evacuation of Tallinn (1941)
  - Yelnya Offensive
  - Battle of Petrikowka
  - Battle of the Sea of Azov
  - Siege of Leningrad (1941–1944)
    - Nevsky Pyatachok
    - Sinyavino Offensive (1942)
  - Battle of Bryansk (1941) October 1941
  - Battle of Hanko (1941)
  - Crimean Campaign (1941)
  - Battle of Jibrieni
  - First Battle of Kharkov
  - Battle at Borodino Field October 1941 – January 1942
  - Siege of Sevastopol (1941–1942)
  - Battle of the Kerch Peninsula
  - Battle of Rostov
  - Rostov Defensive Operation
  - Donbas–Rostov strategic defensive operation
  - Donbas operation (1941)
  - Battle of Moscow
- Battle of Vyazma–Bryansk
- Operation Uzice: September–November 1941
- Action of 6 December 1941
- Soviet Winter counter-offensive: December 1941 – May 1942
  - Kursk–Oboyan Operation
  - Battles of Rzhev
    - Operation Büffel
  - Toropets-Kholm Operation
  - Yevpatoria assault
  - Demyansk Pocket
  - Battle of Cape Burnas
  - Attack on Volodymyrets
  - Second Battle of Kharkov
- Operation Kremlin
- Battle of Lyuban
- Sinyavino offensive (1942)
- Shepetivka operation
- Battle of Veseloe
- Barvenkovo–Lozovaya offensive
- Capture of Putyvl
- Operation Anthropoid
- Axis Summer offensive: June–November 1942
  - Operation Braunschweig: July–November 1942
  - Battle of Voronezh (1942)
    - Operation Nordlicht (1942)
- Vyazma airborne operation
- Battle of Rzhev, summer 1942
- Case Blue
- Battle of Cape Burnas
  - Battle of the Caucasus
    - Malaya Zemlya
  - Battle of Kalach
  - Kozelsk offensive
  - Battle of Rostov (1942)
  - Battle of Stalingrad July 1942 – February 1943
- Battle of Someri
- Operation "Seydlitz"
- Battle of Suursaari
- Battle of Dubovychi
- Battle of Sukho Island
- Operation Uranus: November 1942
- Operation Mars: November–December 1942
- Operation Little Saturn: December 1942 – February 1943
  - Tatsinskaya Raid
- Operation Winter Storm: December 1942
- Battle for Velikiye Luki (1943)
- Operation Iskra
- Operation Polyarnaya Zvezda
  - Battle of Krasny Bor
- Ostrogozhsk-Rossosh Operation
- Battle of Nikolayevka
- Operation Star
- Attack on Volodymyrets
- Malaya Zemlya
- Voronezh–Kharkov offensive
- Operation Koltso
- Demyansk Offensive (1943)
- Operation Gallop
- Battle of Sokolovo
- Battle of Voronezh (1943)
- Operation Büffel
- Częstochowa Ghetto uprising
- Białystok Ghetto uprising
- Third Battle of Kharkov
- Warsaw Ghetto Uprising
  - Battle of Muranów Square
- Operation Citadel: July–August 1943
  - Battle of Kursk
    - Battle of Prokhorovka
    - Operation Kutuzov
    - Izyum–Barvenkovo offensive
- Operation Arsenal
- Treblinka uprising
- Sobibor uprising
- First UPA attack on Mizocz
- Battle of Moczulanka
- Defense of Huta Stepańska and Wyrka
- Donbas strategic offensive (July 1943)
- Donbas strategic offensive (August 1943)
- Operation Tidal Wave
- Battle of Smolensk (1943)
- Battle of Moczulanka

Battle of Vilya

- Mga offensive
  - Battle of Lenino
- Fourth Battle of Kharkov
  - Battle of Belgorod
- Orsha offensives (1943)
- Białystok Ghetto Uprising: August 1943
- Battle of Gruszówka
- Battle of Mieniany
- Defense of Przebraże
- Battle of the Dnieper: August–December 1943
  - Battle of Kiev (1943)
  - Melitopol offensive
- Operation Concert: September 1943
- Battle of Zahoriv monastery
- Gorodok offensive
- Dnieper–Carpathian Offensive: December 1943 – April 1944
  - Zhitomir–Berdichev Offensive
  - Korsun Pocket
  - Uman–Botoșani Offensive
  - Kirovograd offensive
  - Nikopol–Krivoi Rog offensive
  - Bereznegovatoye–Snigirevka offensive
  - Polesskoe offensive
  - Odessa Offensive
  - Kamenets-Podolsky pocket
- Battle of Gurby
- Leningrad–Novgorod Offensive
  - Staraya Russa – Novorzhev Offensive
  - Krasnoye Selo–Ropsha Offensive
  - Kingisepp–Gdov Offensive
  - Novgorod–Luga offensive
- Rovno-Lutsk Offensive
- Rogachev–Zhlobin offensive
- Battle of Narva (1944): February–August 1944
  - Battle for Narva Bridgehead
    - Battle of Auvere
  - Narva Offensive (15–28 February 1944)
  - Narva Offensive (1–4 March 1944)
  - Narva offensive (18–24 March 1944)
  - Narva Offensive (July 1944)
    - Battle of Tannenberg Line
- Operation Margarethe
- Crimean Offensive (1944)
  - Kerch–Eltigen operation
  - Operation 60,000
- Shyaulyay Offensive
- Battle of Graużyszki
- Operation Bielany
- Battle of Leszczawa Górna
- Battle of Lopata Hill
- Battle of Gnojno
- Battle of Boernerowo
- Insurgent attacks on the Bielany airfield
- Raid on Truskaw
- Battle of Murowana Oszmianka
- Operation "Ukrainian Committee"
- Attack of Maziarnia Wawrzkowa
- Battle of Zabłocie
- Battle of Małków
- Battle of Ulhówek and Rzeczyca
- Hrubieszów Revolution
- Vyborg–Petrozavodsk Offensive
- Operation Bagration: June–August 1944
  - Vitebsk–Orsha Offensive
  - Mogilev Offensive
  - Bobruysk Offensive: June 1944
  - Minsk Offensive
  - Battle of Studzianki
  - Polotsk Offensive
  - Šiauliai Offensive
  - Vilnius Offensive
  - Belostock Offensive: July 1944
  - Lublin–Brest Offensive
  - Kaunas Offensive
  - Osovets Offensive
- Battle of the Bay of Viipuri: June–July 1944
- Lvov–Sandomierz Offensive
- Kraków Uprising (1944)
- Battle of Radzymin (1944)
- Sandomierz bridgehead
- Operation Tempest
  - Lwów uprising
  - Operation Ostra Brama
  - Warsaw Uprising
  - Warsaw airlift
  - Insurgent attacks on Warszawa Gdańska railway station
  - Defense of the Wola cemeteries
  - Operation Kutschera
  - Battle of Ceber
  - Battle of Porytowe Wzgórze
  - Battle of Osuchy
  - Raid on Truskaw
  - Battle of Jaktorów
  - "W" Hour
  - Battle of Pęcice
  - Defense of Pociecha
- Battle of Studzianki
- Battle of Oździutycze
- Battle of Stężarzyce
- Battles of Nabróż
- Battles of Narol
- Operation Doppelkopf
  - Operation Cäsar
- Tartu offensive
- Battle of Romania: April–October 1944
  - First Jassy–Kishinev Offensive
    - Battle of Târgu Frumos
    - First Battle of Târgu Frumos
    - Battle of Podu Iloaiei
    - Second Battle of Târgu Frumos
  - Second Jassy–Kishinev Offensive
    - Operation Margarethe II
  - Operation Reunion
  - Battle of Turda
  - Battle of Păuliș
  - Battle of Carei
  - 1944 Romanian coup d'état
- Vyborg-Petrozavodsk Offensive
  - Battle of Nerva Island
  - Battle of Tienhaara
  - Kaprolat
  - VKT-line
  - Battle of Tali–Ihantala
  - Battle of Vyborg Bay (1944)
  - Battle of Vuosalmi
  - Battle of Nietjärvi
  - Battle of Ilomantsi (1944)
  - Operation Hokki
- 1944 Bulgarian coup d'état
- Slovak National Uprising
- Operation Scherhorn
- Battle of the Dukla Pass
- Baltic Offensive
  - Riga Offensive (1944)
  - Tallinn Offensive
    - Battle of Porkuni
  - Moonsund Landing Operation
    - Battle of Tehumardi
  - Battle of Memel
- Liberation of Finnmark
- Battle of Serbia
  - Belgrade Offensive
  - Niš operation
- Lapland war
  - Battle of Olhava
  - Operation Tanne Ost
  - Battle of Rovaniemi
  - Battle of Tornio
  - Operation Birke
  - Operation Nordlicht (1944–1945)
- Petsamo–Kirkenes offensive
- Battle of Debrecen
- Operation Panzerfaust
- Courland Pocket
- Gulf of Finland U-boat campaign
- Gumbinnen Operation
- Budapest Offensive: October 1944 – February 1945
  - Siege of Budapest: December 1944 – February 1945
    - Operation Konrad
    - Operation Konrad III
- Anti-Soviet resistance by the Ukrainian Insurgent Army: April 1944 – October 1945
- Operation Hannibal
- Vistula–Oder Offensive: January–February 1945
  - Battle of Poznań (1945)
- East Prussian Offensive
  - Heiligenbeil Pocket
  - Battle of Königsberg
- Defense of Schwedt Bridgehead
- Silesian Offensives
  - Lower Silesian Offensive
    - Siege of Breslau: February–May 1945
  - Upper Silesian Offensive
- Operation Solstice
- East Pomeranian Offensive
  - Battle of Kolberg
  - Operation Solstice
  - Siege of Danzig (1945)
- Operation Spring Awakening
  - Battle of the Transdanubian Hills
  - Operation Southwind
- Nagykanizsa–Körmend Offensive
- Vienna Offensive
- Bratislava–Brno offensive
- Samland Offensive
- Battle of Berlin: April–May 1945
  - Battle of the Oder-Neisse
    - Battle of the Seelow Heights
  - Battle of Halbe
- Battle of Bautzen (1945): April 1945
- Prague uprising
  - Battle for Czech Radio
- Prague Offensive
- Battle of Kuryłówka
- Battle of Odzak: 19 April – 25 May 1945

=== Yugoslav Partisans ===
- World War II in Yugoslavia
- Yugoslav coup d'état: March 1941
- Invasion of Yugoslavia: April 1941
  - Operation Retribution (1941)
- Mačva operation
- Capture of Banja Koviljača
- Siege of Kraljevo
- Uprising in Montenegro (1941)
- May 1941 Sanski Most revolt
- Capture of Olovo (1941)
- June 1941 uprising in eastern Herzegovina
- Operation Uzice September - November 1941
- Srb uprising
- Battle of Loznica (1941)
- Drvar uprising
- Battle of Trešnjica
- Uprising in Serbia (1941)
- Attack on Kruševac
- Battle of Novi Pazar
- Battle of Pljevlja
- Siege of Rogatica (1941)
- Operation Mihailovic December 1941
- Operation Southeast Croatia
- Battle of Dražgoše: January 1942
- Operation Prijedor
- Operation Hydra (Yugoslavia)
- Battle of Nanos
- Battle of Livno
- Operation Trio April - May 1942
- Operation Alfa
- Battle of Dolnij Poloj
- Battle of Kupres (1942)
- Operation Kopaonik October 1942
- Bihać operation
- Kozara Offensive
- Battle of Gračac: January 1943
- Operation Otto (1943)
- Battle of Grčarice
- Operation Weiss
- Operation Schwarz: May - June 1943
- Battle of Zvornik
- Siege of Turjak
- Operation Cloudburst
- Battle of Višegrad
- Operation Delphin
- Operation Kugelblitz
- Battle of Kočevje
- Bombardment of Zagreb February 1944–March 1945
- Raid on Mljet: April 1944
- Raid on Šolta
- Bombing of Belgrade (1944)
- Operation Rösselsprung (1944)
- Operation Halyard
- Operation Draufgänger
- Raid at Ožbalt
- Operation Ratweek (1944)
- Battle of Serbia September - October 1944
  - Belgrade offensive
  - Niš operation
- First Battle of Preševo
- Second Battle of Preševo
- Operation Floxo
- Stracin–Kumanovo operation
- Battle of Vukov Klanac
- Kosovo Operation (1944)
- Liberation of Tirana
- Syrmian Front: October 1944 - April 1945
- Bregalnitsa–Strumica operation
- Battle of Knin
- Battle of Batina
- Battle of Desivojca December 1944
- Battle of Trnovo: January 1945
- Operation Spring Awakening
- Lika-Primorje operation
- Mostar operation
- Sarajevo Operation
- Nagykanizsa–Körmend offensive
- Battle of Odžak
- Battle of Poljana: May 1945

=== Albania ===
- Italian invasion of Albania
  - Battle of Durrës (1939)
- Battle of Gjorm
- Battle of Drashovica
- Battle of Përmet
- Battle of Pezë (1943)
- Battle of Reç
- Battle of Drashovica
- Battle of Tirana and Kruja (1943)
- Liberation of Tepelena
- Liberation of Tirana

=== Greece ===
- German invasion of Greece: April - June 1941
  - Battle of the Metaxas Line
  - Battle of Vevi (1941)
  - Battle of Ptolemaida
  - Battle of the Corinth Canal
  - Battle of Lake Kastoria
  - Battle of Tempe Gorge
  - Battle of Athens (1941)
  - Battle of Thermopylae (1941)
  - Battle of Kleisoura Pass: April 1941
  - Battle of Crete: May - June 1941
    - Battle of Maleme
    - Battle of Rethymno
    - Battle of 42nd Street
    - Battle of Heraklion
- Greek Resistance
  - Drama uprising: September 1941
  - Operation Harling: November 1942
  - Battle of Leivadi
  - Battle of Meritsa
  - Battle of Fardykambos: March 1943
  - Battle of Trahili
  - Operation Animals
  - Battle of Porta
  - Battle of Sarantaporos (1943)
  - Battle of Kokkinia: March 1944
  - Raid on Santorini
  - Battle of Amfilochia
  - Battle of Chora - Agorelitsa
  - Battle of Menina
  - Raid on Symi
  - Damasta sabotage
  - Battle of Karoutes
  - Battle of Kalamata (1944) September 1944
  - Battle of Meligalas
  - Battle of Kilkis (1944)
  - Operation Manna: October 1944
  - Dekemvriana: December 1944

== Indian Ocean ==
- Attack on Convoy BN 7 October 1940
- Action of 27 February 1941
- Action of 8 May 1941
- Japanese occupation of the Andaman Islands: 1942–1945
- Battle of Christmas Island: March–April 1942
- Indian Ocean raid: March–April 1942
- Easter Sunday Raid: April 1942
- Battle of Madagascar: May–November 1942
- Cocos Island Mutiny: May 1942
- Battle of La Réunion: November 1942
- Indian Ocean raid (1944): March 1944
- Operation Cockpit: April 1944
- Operation Transom: May 1944
- Operation Crimson: July 1944
- Operation Banquet (Padang): August 1944
- Operation Boomerang: August 1944
- Operation Light: September 1944
- Operation Millet: October 1944
- Operation Outflank: November 1944
- Operation Robson: December 1944
- Operation Lentil (Sumatra): January 1945
- Operation Meridian: January 1945
- Operation Sunfish: April 1945
- Battle of the Malacca Strait: April 1945
- Operation Balsam: June 1945
- Operation Collie: July 1945
- Operation Livery: July 1945

== Pacific Front ==
- Japanese attacks on the U.S. or U.S. unincorporated territories
  - Attack on Pearl Harbor 7 December 1941
    - Niihau Incident
  - Battle of Guam (1941) December 1941
  - Battle of Wake Island December 1941
  - Japanese occupation of Philippines: December 1941 – May 1942
    - Japanese invasion of Batan Island December 1941
    - Japanese invasion of Vigan December 1941
    - Japanese invasion of Aparri December 1941
    - Japanese invasion of Legazpi December 1941
    - Japanese invasion of Davao December 1941
    - Japanese invasion of Lingayen Gulf December 1941
    - Japanese invasion of Lamon Bay December 1941
    - Battle of Bataan (1942), January–April 1942
    - Battle of Corregidor: May 1942
  - Bombardment of Ellwood February 1942
  - Battle of Los Angeles February 1942
  - Japanese occupation of Aleutian Islands
    - Battle of Dutch Harbor: June 1942
    - Japanese occupation of Kiska: June 1942
    - Japanese occupation of Attu: June 1942
  - Bombardment of Fort Stevens June 1942
  - Lookout Air Raids September 1942
- Japanese occupation of Hong Kong December 1941
  - Battle of Hong Kong
- Japanese occupation of Dutch East Indies: December 1941 – March 1942
  - Battle of Borneo (1941–42)
    - Battle of Tarakan (1942)
    - Battle of Balikpapan (1942)
  - Battle of Manado (1942)
  - Battle of Ambon (1942)
  - Battle of Makassar Strait (1942)
  - Fall of the Riau Islands (1942)
  - Invasion of Sumatra (1942)
  - Battle of Kalijati
  - Battle of Kendari
  - Battle of Leuwiliang
  - Battle of Samarinda
  - Battle of Banjarmasin
  - Battle of Tjiater Pass
  - Battle of Palembang (1942)
  - Battle of Badung Strait (1942)
  - Battle of Timor (1942–43)
  - Battle of the Java Sea (1942)
  - Battle of Sunda Strait (1942)
  - Battle of Java (1942)
  - Second Battle of the Java Sea (1942)
- Japanese Invasion of Rabaul, January–February 1942
- Battle of Port Moresby, February 1942 – August 1943
- Invasion of Buka and Bougainville, March – April 1942
- Japanese attacks on Australia: February–June 1942
  - Bombing of Darwin: February 1942
  - Attack on Broome: March 1942
  - Attack on Sydney Harbour: May–June 1942
  - Raid on Darwin: May 1943
- Operation K : March 1942
- Japanese Invasion of Salamaua–Lae, March 1942
  - Raid on Heath's Farm July 1942
- Doolittle Raid : April 1942
- Japanese Invasion of Tulagi, May 1942
- Battle of the Coral Sea, May 1942
- Battle of Midway, June 1942
- Japanese Invasion of Buna-Gona, July 1942
- Kokoda Track campaign, July–November 1942
  - Battle of Kokoda
  - Battle of Isurava, August 1942
  - First Battle of Eora Creek – Templeton's Crossing, August–September 1942
  - Battle of Mission Ridge – Brigade Hill,
  - Battle of Ioribaiwa, September 1942
  - Second Battle of Eora Creek – Templeton's Crossing, October 1942
  - Battle of Oivi–Gorari, November 1942
- Japanese occupation of Nauru August 1942
- Battle of Milne Bay, August–September 1942
- Guadalcanal Campaign: August 1942 – February 1943
  - Battle of Tulagi and Gavutu–Tanambogo, August 1942
  - Battle of Savo Island, August 1942
  - Makin Island raid, August 1942
  - Battle of the Tenaru: August 1942
  - Battle of the Eastern Solomons, August 1942
  - Battle of Edson's Ridge: September 1942
  - Actions along the Matanikau: September–October 1942
  - Battle of Cape Esperance, October 1942
  - Battle for Henderson Field: October 1942
  - Battle of the Santa Cruz Islands, October 1942
  - Matanikau Offensive: November 1942
  - Koli Point action: November 1942
  - Carlson's Patrol: November–December 1942
  - Naval Battle of Guadalcanal. November 1942
  - Battle of Tassafaronga, November 1942
  - Battle of Mount Austen, the Galloping Horse, and the Sea Horse: December 1942
  - Operation Ke: January – February 1943
  - Battle of Rennell Island: January 1943
- New Guinea campaign: October 1942 – August 1945
  - Battle of Goodenough Island, October 1942
  - Battle of Buna–Gona, November 1942 – January 1943
  - Battle of Wau, January 1943
  - Battle of the Bismarck Sea, March 1943
  - Salamaua–Lae campaign, April–September 1943
    - Battle of Mubo, April–July 1943
    - Battle of Bobdubi, April–August 1943
    - Battle of Lababia Ridge, June 1943
    - Landing at Nassau Bay, June–July 1943
    - Battle of Roosevelt Ridge, July–August 1943
    - Battle of Mount Tambu, July–August 1943
    - Landing at Lae, September 1943
    - Landing at Nadzab, September 1943
  - Finisterre Range campaign, September 1943 – April 1944
  - Battle of Kaiapit September 1943
  - Battle of Dumpu September – October 1943
  - Battle of John's Knoll–Trevor's Ridge October 1943
  - Battle of the Pimple December 1943
  - Battle of Shaggy Ridge January 1944
  - Battle of Madang, February–April 1944
  - Huon Peninsula campaign, September 1943 – March 1944
    - Landing at Scarlet Beach, September–October 1943
    - Battle of Finschhafen, September–October 1943
    - Battle of Sattelberg, November 1943
    - Battle of Wareo, November–December 1943
    - Landing on Long Island, December 1943
    - Battle of Sio, December 1943 – March 1944
    - Landing at Saidor, January–February 1944
    - Landing on Emirau, March 1944
- Bombing of Wewak
- Operation Vengeance, April 1943
- Bougainville Campaign, November 1943 – August 1945
  - Battle of Koromokina Lagoon November 1943
  - Landings at Cape Torokina November 1943
  - Battle of Piva Forks November 1943
  - Battle for Piva Trail November 1943
  - Battle of the Coconut Grove November 1943
  - Raid on Koiari November 1943
  - Battle of Hellzapoppin Ridge and Hill 600A December 1943
  - Neutralisation of Rabaul January-February 1944
  - Torokina Airfield March 1944
  - Piva Airfield March 1944
  - Battle of the Green Islands February 1944
  - Bougainville counterattack March 1944
  - Battle of the Perimeter March 1944
  - Battle of Pearl Ridge, December 1944
  - Battle of Tsimba Ridge January – February 1945
  - Battle of Slater's Knoll, March – April 1945
  - Battle of the Hongorai River May – June 1945
  - Battle of Porton Plantation June 1945
  - Battle of Ratsua June – August 1945
- New Britain campaign, December 1943 – August 1945
  - Bombing of Rabaul November 1943
  - Battle of Arawe December 1943 - February 1944
  - Battle of Cape Gloucester: December 1943 – April 1944
  - Battle of Karavia Bay, February 1944
  - Battle of Talasea March 1944
  - Landing at Jacquinot Bay November 1944
  - Battle of Wide Bay–Open Bay December 1944 - April 1945
- Admiralty Islands campaign, February–May 1944
- Western New Guinea campaign, April 1944 – August 1945
  - Landing at Aitape Apri-May 1944
  - Battle of Hollandia April-June 1944
  - Battle of Wakde May 1944
  - Battle of Lone Tree Hill May-September 1944
  - Battle of Biak May-August 1944
  - Battle of Noemfoor July-August 1944
  - Battle of Driniumor River July-August 1944
  - Battle of Sansapor July-August 1944
  - . Battle of Morotai September-October 1944
  - Aitape-Wewak campaign 1944-1945
- Aleutian Islands Campaign, March–August 1943
  - Landing at Amchitka, January 1943
  - Battle of the Komandorski Islands: March 1943
  - Battle of Attu: May 1943
  - Battle of the Pips: July 1943
  - Operation Cottage: August 1943
- Solomon Islands Campaign, June–November 1943
  - Battle of Blackett Strait, March 1943
  - Operation I-Go, April 1943
  - Operation Cartwheel, June 1943 – March 1944
  - Operation SO and SE, June 1943
  - New Georgia Campaign, June–August 1943
  - New Georgia counterattack, July 1943
    - Landings on Rendova, June–July 1943
    - Battle of Viru Harbor, June–July 1943
    - Battle of Arundel Island, August–September 1943
    - Battle of Munda Point: July–August 1943
    - Drive on Munda Point: July 1943
  - Battle of Wickham Anchorage, June-July 1943
  - Battle of Kula Gulf: July 1943
  - Battle of Bairoko: July 1943
  - Battle of Enogai: July 1943
  - Battle of Kolombangara: July 1943
  - Battle off Horaniu: August 1943
  - Battle of Vella Gulf: August 1943
  - Land Battle of Vella Lavella: August–October 1943
  - Naval Battle of Vella Lavella: October 1943
  - Raid on Choiseul: October–November 1943
  - Battle of Empress Augusta Bay: November 1943
  - Battle of Cape St. George: November 1943
  - Battle of the Treasury Islands: November 1943
  - Operation Dexterity, December 1943
  - Battle of Karavia Bay, February 1944
- Gilbert and Marshall Islands campaign, November 1943 – February 1944
  - Battle of Tarawa, November 1943
  - Battle of Makin, November 1943
  - Attack on Truk, February 1944
  - Battle of Eniwetok, February 1944
- Mariana and Palau Islands campaign, June–November 1944
  - Battle of Saipan, June 1944
  - Battle of the Philippine Sea, June 1944
  - Battle of Guam (1944), July–August 1944
  - Battle of Tinian, July–August 1944
  - Battle of Peleliu, September–November 1944
  - Shin'yō Maru incident, September 1944
  - Battle of Angaur, September–October 1944
- Formosa Air Battle, October 1944
- Philippines Campaign (1944–45): October 1944 – September 1945
  - Battle of Leyte: October–December 1944
  - Battle of Leyte Gulf: October 1944
    - Battle off Samar: 25 October 1944
    - Battle of Ormoc Bay: November–December 1944
    - Battle of Mindoro December 1944
  - Battle of Luzon: January–August 1945
  - Raid at Cabanatuan January 1945
  - South China Sea raid January 1945
  - Battle of Camotes Islands January 1945
  - Invasion of Lingayen Gulf January 1945
  - Battle of Maguindanao January – September 1945
  - Battle of Bataan (1945) January – February 1945
  - Battle of Corregidor (1945) February 1945
  - Battle of Manila (1945): February–March 1945
  - Battle of Wawa Dam: February – March 1945
  - Raid on Los Baños February 1945
  - Battle of Baguio: February – April 1945
  - Battle of Villa Verde Trail February – May 1945
  - Invasion of Palawan February – April 1945
  - Battle of Bacsil Ridge: March 1945
  - Talisay Landing: March 1945
  - Battle of Visayas: March – August 1945
  - Battle of Mindanao: March–Aug 1945
  - Battle of Davao April – June 1945
  - Battle for Cebu City: March–Apr 1945
  - Battle of Bessang Pass June 1945
  - Battle of Mayoyao Ridge July – August 1945
- Battle of Iwo Jima: February–March 1945
- Battle of Okinawa: April–June 1945
  - Operation Ten-Go
  - Operation Kikusui
- Attack on Kure (March 1945)
- Attacks on Kure and the Seto Inland Sea July 1945
- Attack on Yokosuka
- Borneo campaign, May – August 1945
  - Battle of Tarakan (1945) May – June 1945
  - Battle of North Borneo June – August 1945
  - Battle of Labuan, June 1945
  - Battle of Balikpapan (1945): July 1945
- Atomic bombings of Hiroshima and Nagasaki: August 1945
- Kyūjō incident August 1945
- Soviet invasion of Manchuria August 1945
  - Battle of Mutanchiang August 1945
  - Siege of Hutou Fortress
  - Seishin Operation
  - Soviet invasion of South Sakhalin
    - Soviet assault on Maoka
  - Invasion of the Kuril Islands
    - Battle of Shumshu
- Liberation of Hong Kong

== China Front ==
- 1931–1945 Sino-Japanese War (September 1931 – September 1945)
  - Japanese invasion of Manchuria September 1931 – February 1932
    - Mukden Incident September 1931
    - Jiangqiao campaign November 1931
      - Resistance at Nenjiang Bridge November 1931
    - Jinzhou Operation December 1931 – January 1932
    - Defense of Harbin January 1932 – February 1932
  - January 28 incident January–March 1932
  - Pacification of Manchukuo November 1931 – February 1942
  - Inner Mongolian campaign April 1933 – December 1936
    - Defense of the Great Wall February–March 1933
      - Battle of Rehe February–March 1933
    - Suiyuan campaign October–November 1936
  - Marco Polo Bridge Incident July 1937
  - Battle of Beiping–Tianjin July–August 1937
  - Operation Chahar, August–October 1937
  - Battle of Shanghai August 1937
    - Bloody Saturday August 1937
    - Defense of Sihang Warehouse October 26, 1937
  - Beiping–Hankou Railway Operation August 1937
  - Tianjin–Pukou Railway Operation August 1937
  - Battle of Taiyuan September 1937
    - Battle of Pingxingguan September 1937
    - Battle of Xinkou September 1937
  - Battle of Nanjing December 1937
  - Battle of Xuzhou February – May 1938
    - Battle of Taierzhuang March 1938
  - Bombing of Chongqing February 1938 – August 1943
  - Taihoku Air Strike February 1938
  - Battle of Northern and Eastern Henan February–June 1938
    - Battle of Lanfeng May 1938
  - Amoy Operation May 1938
  - Battle of Wuhan June 1938
    - Battle of Wanjialing August 1938
  - Canton Operation October 1938
  - Hainan Island Operation February 1939
  - Battle of Nanchang March 1939
  - Battle of Suixian-Zaoyang May 1939
  - Swatow Operation June 1939
  - First Battle of Changsha September–October 1939
  - Battle of South Guangxi November 1939
    - Battle of Kunlun Pass December 1939
  - 1939–1940 Winter Offensive November 1939
    - Battle of Baotou
    - Battle of West Suiyuan January–February 1940
    - Battle of Wuyuan March 1940
  - Battle of Zaoyang-Yichang May 1940
  - Hundred Regiments Offensive August 1940
  - Central Hupei Operation November 1940
  - Battle of South Henan January 1941
  - New Fourth Army Incident January 1941
  - Western Hopei Operation March 1941
  - Battle of Shanggao March 1941
  - Battle of South Shanxi May 1941
  - Second Battle of Changsha September–October 1941
- Third Battle of Changsha December 1941 – January 1942
  - Battle of Zhejiang-Jiangxi May–September 1942
  - Battle of West Hubei May–June 1943
  - Linnan Campaign August 1943
  - Battle of Changde November–December 1943
  - Operation Ichi-Go April–December 1944
    - Battle of Central Henan April 1944
    - Fourth Battle of Changsha May–June 1944
    - Defense of Hengyang June–August 1944
    - Battle of Guilin–Liuzhou August–November 1944
  - Battle of Mount Song June–September 1944
  - Battle of West Henan–North Hubei March 1945 — May 1945
  - Battle of West Hunan April 1945 – June 1945
  - Second Guangxi Campaign April–August 1945
  - Soviet invasion of Manchuria August 1945
    - Battle of Mutanchiang August 1945
- Soviet–Japanese border conflicts March 1932 – September 1945
    - Battle of Khalkhyn Temple 1935
    - Tauran Incident
    - Kanchazu Island incident
    - Battle of Lake Khasan
    - Battles of Khalkhin Gol

== Southeast Asia Front ==
- Japanese invasion of French Indochina: September 1940
- Franco-Thai War: October 1940 – January 1941
  - Battle of Ko Chang: January 1941
- Japanese invasion of Thailand: December 1941
  - Battle of Prachuap Khiri Khan: December 1941
- Japanese-Thai occupation of Malaya: December 1941 – January 1942
  - Battle of Kota Bharu
  - Operation Krohcol
  - Naval Battle of Malaya
  - Battle of Jitra
  - Battle of Gurun
  - Battle of Kampar
  - Battle of Slim River
  - Battle of Kuala Lumpur
  - Battle of Muar
    - Battle of Gemas
  - Battle off Endau
- Bombing of Bangkok: 1942–1945
- Japanese occupation of Singapore: February 1942
  - Bombing of Singapore (1941)
  - Battle of Sarimbun Beach
  - Battle of Kranji
  - Battle of Bukit Timah
  - Battle of Pasir Panjang
- Burma Campaign
  - Japanese-Thai occupation of Burma: January–May 1942
    - Bombing of Rangoon (1941–1942)
    - Battle of Bilin River
    - Battle of Sittang Bridge
    - Battle of Pegu
    - Battle of Prome (1942)
    - Bombing of Mandalay (1942)
    - Taukkyan Roadblock
    - Battle of Yunnan-Burma Road
      - Battle of Tachiao
      - Battle of Oktwin
      - Battle of Toungoo
      - Battle of Yenangyaung
  - Operation Jaywick
  - Burma Campaign 1942–43
    - Arakan Campaign 1942–1943
    - Chindits Raid
  - Burma Campaign 1944
    - Battle of the Admin Box
    - Battle of Mogaung
    - Siege of Myitkyina
  - Japanese invasion of India: March–June 1944
    - Battle of Imphal
    - Battle of Sangshak
    - Battle of Kohima
    - Battle of the Tennis Court
    - Operation Capital
  - Burma Campaign 1944–1945
    - Battle of Northern Burma and Western Yunnan
    - Battle of Meiktila and Mandalay
    - Battle of Pokoku and Irrawaddy River operations
    - Battle of Hill 170
    - Battle of Ramree Island
    - Operation Dracula
    - Battle of Tanlwe Chaung
    - Battle of Elephant Point
    - Battle of the Sittang Bend
- Allies bombing of South-East Asia: 1944–1945
  - Operation Matterhorn: 1944
- Battles of Phai Khắt and Nà Ngần: 1944
- Battle of the Malacca Strait: May 1945
- August Revolution: August 1945
  - Battle of Thái Nguyên
- Operation Jurist: September 1945
- Operation Tiderace: September 1945

== Military engagements during occupations ==
- Occupation of Denmark
  - Operation Safari
    - Battle of Isefjord
- Occupation of Norway
  - Telavåg tragedy

== Resistances ==
- Danish resistance
- Norwegian resistance
- Greek resistance
  - Battle of Fardykambos
- Moldovan resistance

== Naval engagements ==
General

- Arctic Convoys
- Battle of the Atlantic – the name given to the conflict in the Atlantic Ocean between 1939 and 1945.
  - see also Timeline of the Battle of the Atlantic
- Battle of the Mediterranean
- Battle of the Indian Ocean

Specific

1940

- First Battle of Narvik
- Second Battle of Narvik

1941

- Battle of Cape Matapan
- Battle of Pearl Harbor

1942

- Battle of the Coral Sea
- Battle of Midway
- Battle of Guadalcanal

1943

- Battle of the Komandorski Islands

1944

- Battle of Leyte Gulf

1945

- Operation Ten-Go

== Major bombing campaigns ==
General

- Strategic bombing during World War II
- Strategic bombing survey for the overall impact of the bombing.

Specific

- Baedeker raids
- Chungking
- Coventry
- Operation Retribution (1941) – bombing of Belgrade during 1941.
- Broome – Japanese raid on the town of Broome, targeting the airfield.
- Dresden
- Darwin – Japanese target the harbour.
- Hamburg
- Helsinki – February 1944, was mostly ineffective due to air defence and deception.
- Hiroshima – One nuclear weapon, Little Boy dropped from a B-29, devastating a city.
- Kassel
- London – "The Blitz" and the V-1 and V-2 campaigns
- Lübeck
- Nagasaki – One nuclear weapon, Fat Man dropped from a B-29, devastating a city.
- Narva – March 1944. Evacuated town was destroyed by Soviet ADD.
- Pearl Harbor
- Rostock – Heinkel Airplane Construction Plant, Seaport, and City
- Rotterdam
- Stalingrad – 23 August 1942
- Tallinn – February–March 1944. Bombed by Soviet ADD. Large-scale damage.
- Tokyo – Several devastating raids.
- Warsaw

== Operations ==
=== Raids ===
Small to medium-sized raiding operations were carried out by both Allied and Axis armies during World War II. The modus operandi used included guerrilla attacks by partisans in occupied territory and/or combined operations involving the landing and removal of specialised light infantry, such as commandos, by means of small boats.

- Allied
  - Operation Colossus
    - 10 February 1941
    - Experimental raid by 38 British Commandos on a fresh water aqueduct near Calitri in southern Italy.
  - Operation Claymore
    - 4 March 1941
    - 1000 Men from the British Commandos and belonging to the Norwegian Independent Company 1 destroy fish oil factories on the remote islands off the coast of Norway.
  - Operation Archery
    - 27 December 1941
    - 570 men from the British Commandos and belonging to the Norwegian Independent Company 1 raid and attack German positions on Vågsøy Island in Norway.
  - Battle of Timor
    - 19 February 1942 – 10 February 1943
    - Continuous raids from Australian commandos against the occupying Japanese.
  - Operation Chariot
    - 28 March 1942
    - 196 Royal Navy and Army Commando units raid and destroy the heavily defended docks of St. Nazaire in occupied France.
  - Dieppe Raid
    - 19 August 1942
    - Over 6,000 infantrymen, mostly Canadian attempted to seize and hold the port of Dieppe.
  - Makin Island raid, 17–18 August 1942
  - Operation Jaywick, September 1943
  - Operation Jedburgh, 1944
  - Operation Roast, April 1945
- Axis
  - Operation Greif, December 1944

Raiding units

- Allied
  - Multinational
    - Chindits
    - Devil's Brigade
    - Z Special Unit
    - Popski's Private Army
    - Gideon Force
  - Australia
    - Australian Army Independent Companies
  - France
    - Far East French Expeditionary Forces
    - Intervention Light Corps
  - Greece
    - Sacred Band
  - United Kingdom
    - Long Range Desert Group
    - Special Air Service
    - Royal Marines
    - Special Operations Executive
    - British Army Commandos
      - Layforce
    - British Paratroopers
  - United States
    - Marine Raiders
    - US Army Rangers
    - Alamo Scouts
    - Merrill's Marauders
- Axis
  - Nazi Germany
    - Brandenburger Regiment
    - Waffen-SS (commando force led by Otto Skorzeny).
  - Fascist Italy
    - Decima Flottiglia MAS
  - Empire of Japan
    - Special Naval Landing Forces

== Defensive lines ==
- Atlantic Wall
- Caesar Line
- GHQ Line
- Gothic Line
- Gustav Line
- Maginot Line
- Mannerheim Line
- Metaxas Line
- Siegfried Line
- Taunton Stop Line

== Contemporaneous wars ==
- Chinese Civil War
- Ecuadorian–Peruvian War
- Greek Civil War
- Second Italo-Abyssinian War
- Soviet-Japanese Border War (1939)
- Spanish Civil War
- Waziristan campaign (1936–1939)
- Afghan tribal revolts of 1944–1947

== See also ==
- Campaigns of World War II
- Participants in World War II
- List of World War II military operations
- List of battles 1901–2000
