= Battle of Gnojno =

Part of World War 2 (1944)

- Part of the Polish–Ukrainian conflict and Eastern Front of World War II
Date	18–19 January 1944
Location	Gnojno, Volyn Oblast
Result	Ukrainian victory

Belligerents
Ukrainian Insurgent Army	Home Army

Commanders and leaders
Unknown	Jerzy Krasowski

Units involved
Unspecified	27th Volhynian Infantry Division: "Piotrusia" unit; "Jarosława" unit; "Lecha" unit

Strength
500	3 companies

Casualties and losses
Unknown	1–5 killed 3 wounded

The Battle of Gnojno or Attack on Gnojno took place as part of the attempts to capture Włodzimierz after German withdrawal, with the main attack occurring on UPA base in Gnojno organised by AK. On 18–19 January, 1944.

== Prelude ==
During January 10–15, 27th Volhynian Infantry Division of the Home Army wasn't fully formed yet, but was already involved in operations. "Osnowa" unit engaged in skirmishes with UPA in the north of Włodzimierz Wołyński. Large number of UPA forces was located in Gnojno. UPA forces stationed there posed a threat to AK forces from the Eastern direction. Concerning activities were reported regarding Germans and UPA partisans near Włodzimierz Wołyński. AK intended to capture Włodzimierz Wołyński and eliminate UPA base in Gnojno. "Piotrusia", "Jarosława" and "Lecha" units took part in the assault.

== Battle ==
On January 18, AK received the news of German troops abandoning Włodzimierz Wołyński. AK troops headed to Włodzimierz Wołyński with intention of capturing it. However, Lt. "Bogoria" decided not to strike the city for unknown reason. On January 19, AK learnt from captured UPA partisans about planned UPA attack on Bielin, which was going to be launched from their base in Gnojno. Lt. "Bogoria" decided to disrupt planned UPA assault by attacking their base there. AK clashed with one of UPA units in Ludmipol settlement and made them retreat.

AK forces were 1.5 km away from the settlement, but with all the fighting they alerted the main UPA force in Gnojno and lost the element of surprise. UPA was given time to react and repel AK assaults. First AK attack on Gnojno was met with organised UPA fire from well-fortified positions, which paralyzed the AK attack. This occurred in outskirts of the settlement, AK troops hidden from UPA fire for 3 hours before being forced to retreat. Other AK attacks were also repelled and UPA defense held firmly. Polish forces retreated to Bielin and Siedlisko after these failed attacks.

== Aftermath ==
AK operation in Gnojno was unsuccessful. AK losses were 1 killed and 3 wounded. Other sources estimate AK losses at 5 killed. UPA losses couldn't be estimated.

On January 25, UPA attacked Bielin in response to previous AK attacks. UPA attack was repelled, but the UPA-men still managed to cause destruction in several Polish settlements. On 29 January, AK units attacked Babie and Szczu settlements, which only achieved limited success with devastation of these settlements.

== Bibliography ==
- Turowski, Józef (1990). walki 27 Wołyńskiej Dywizji AK (in Polish). State Publisher. Nauk. ISBN 8301084650.
- Filar, Władysław (2011). "DZIAŁANIA 27 WOŁYŃSKIEJ DYWIZJI PIECHOTY ARMII KRAJOWEJ CZĘŚĆ 1" (PDF) (in Polish). Warsaw.
