= Battle of Leszczawa Górna =

- Part of the Anti-Soviet resistance by the Ukrainian Insurgent Army and Eastern Front of World War II
| Date | 24 October 1944 |
| Location | Leszczawa Górna, Subcarpathian Voivodeship |
| Result | Ukrainian victory |

Belligerents
| Ukrainian Insurgent Army | NKVD |

Commanders and leaders
| Stepan Stebelsky (WIA) | Unknown |

Strength
| 500 | Initial Attacks: 300; Final Attacks: 1,100–2,500; 3 tanks |

Casualties and losses
| 23 killed 5 wounded (Note: 8 wounded (3 died of wounds)) | 207 killed Equipment losses: 13 trucks destroyed; 2 armoured cars destroyed; Several tanks, tankettes and vehicles destroyed |
- Several civilians killed

The Battle of Leszczawa Górna took place between the Ukrainian Insurgent Army (UPA) and Soviet NKVD. Considered to be the largest battle between UPA and Soviet forces in Poland on 24 October 1944.

== Prelude ==
On 20 October, Stepan Stebelsky's 500-strong sotnia took up positions in Leszczawa Górna. The battle was going to take place on 24 October. According to other sources, the battle took place on 28 October.

== Battle ==
At around 7 AM, 300-strong NKVD detachment with armoured support was dispatched to counter UPA fighters in Leszczawa Górna. Insurgents used buildings, trees, along with other surroundings as fortifications and firing positions. NKVD launched 2 assaults on insurgent positions, both of which ended in failure. Soviet troops advanced across exposed fields which made them easy targets. According description of Stepan Stebelsky on these clashes: "The Bolsheviks fled and constantly shouted 'Forward! Ura! (Hooray!).' We have several killed and wounded. We set aside the second ones to one stack, where the doctors bandage them. The wounds are severe, because the enemy hits only with explosive, incendiary and phosphorus bullets."

As a result of previous failed attacks, an additional 800–2,200 troops and several tanks were dispatched to support NKVD. Insurgents were inflicting heavy losses on Soviet troops and critically damaging their equipment. However, a fire broke out that spread during the battle. Later, Soviet forces again advanced and eventually pushed out the insurgents. Many UPA commanders abandoned their troops, but the battle didn't end. Some of insurgents fortified themselves in other settlements. Major battle took place between Leszczawa and the village of Limna in the mountains. NKVD attempts to encircle insurgents were unsuccessful. NKVD retreated after their final attack was repulsed. The fighting lasted for 15 hours.

== Aftermath ==
Some of UPA units were disbanded after this battle and transferred to self-defense, while other units moved to eastern Subcarpathia. Fighting in Leszczawa Górna became known as one of the largest between UPA and Soviets in 1944, and the largest between UPA and Soviets in Poland Unidentified Soviet general was claimed to have been killed in this battle. Stepan Stebelsky was severally wounded in both arms during the battle, but saved from captivity by a nurse.
