= Operation Chettyford =

1944 deception plan during World War II

During World War II, Operation Chettyford (also known as Plan Chettyford) was the code name for a tactical deception mounted in January 1944 in support of the 1944 Allied invasion at Anzio. The plan was meant to convince the Germans that Allied forces led by George Patton would launch a pincer attack against Pisa on the west coast of Italy and Rimini on the east coast, and aimed to contain German reserves to northern Italy.

To promote the deception, double agents were deployed to the regions, and dummy Sherman tanks, vehicles and guns were set up to simulate the presence of Allied forces. The notional targets of Pisa and Rimini were scouted by air and bombed. Dummy radio traffic was put out by the US Seventh Army headquarters in Sicily, and pamphlets of the history and cultural artifacts of Pisa were distributed. Patton made a well-publicized visit to units based around Cairo, arranging photographs with senior Polish commanders.

Although the Operation Chettyford deceptions went largely unnoticed by the Germans, later tactical deceptions in Italy in 1944 were modeled after it.
