= Battle of Lopata Hill =

1944 battle in Ukraine during WWII

- Part of the Eastern Front of World War II
Date	6–16 July 1944
Location	Lopata Hill, near Skole, Lviv Oblast
Result	Ukrainian victory

Belligerents
Ukrainian Insurgent Army	Germany; Hungary

Commanders and leaders
Vasyl Andrusyak	Unknown

Strength
600	3 Divisions; 1 Regiment

Casualties and losses
30 casualties	200–450+ casualties Heavy

The Battle of Lopata Hill took place between the Ukrainian Insurgent Army and German-Hungarian forces, on 6–16 July 1944.

== Prelude ==
On July 1, Vasyl Andrusyak's unit was tasked with clearing Carpathian forests from Soviet partisans who were attacking Ukrainian settlements. However, UPA encountered a German convoy on the way, which they chose to ambush.

== Battle ==
On July 6, insurgents ambushed a German convoy and disarmed it, capturing a German officer. The officer revealed German documents about planned offensives on settlements that were going to take place. On July 7, insurgents prepared defenses and were going to battle with German troops.

On July 8, German forces launched an attack on UPA positions, one of insurgent units enforced themselves on the hill while the other was holding off the enemy to give other unit time. The Germans were repelled. The German-Hungarian forces launched another three attacks during the same day, which had the same outcome. On July 9, German troops fell into insurgent ambushes and launched an unsuccessful attack on insurgent position. On July 10, Germans again fell into ambush, while defending Breza, Kamianka, and Sukil settlements with support of artillery and Luftwaffe. Despite this, Germans eventually retreated.

On July 11, Germans fortified themselves in Mizun Staryi and Solotvyna Mizunska settlements, while UPA fought and routed a Soviet detachment during this time. On July 12, third German division arrived, which limited itself to shelling UPA positions, which were abandoned by then. On July 14, most of German troops fled to Bolekhiv settlement. On July 16, the rest of German forces fled to Dolyna. However, German forces also fell into ambushes while retreating.

== Aftermath ==
German-Hungarian forces were repelled and suffered heavy losses. UPA occupied an area worth of 1,000 square meters after German-Hungarian retreat. One of German officers reportedly stated on these events: "I have crossed the French and Eastern campaigns, and now at the end of the war I will have to die in these mountains in battles with the UPA". After a 10-day battle, UPA continued with their mission of clearing Carpathian forests from Soviet partisans, which was successful.
