= Malinowski =

Malinowski (Polish pronunciation: [malʲiˈnɔfskʲi]; feminine: Malinowska; plural: Malinowscy) is a surname of Polish-language origin. It is related to the following surnames:

Language	Masculine	Feminine
Polish	Malinowski	Malinowska
Belarusian (Romanization)	Маліноўскі (Malinoŭski)	Маліноўская (Malinoŭskaja)
Bulgarian (Romanization)	Малиновски (Malinovski)	Малиновска (Malinovska)
Latvian	Maļinovskis	
Lithuanian	Malinauskas	Malinauskienė (married); Malinauskaitė (unmarried)
Russian (Romanization)	Малиновский (Malinovsky, Malinovskiy, Malinovskij)	Малиновская (Malinovskaya, Malinovskaia, Malinovskaja)
Ukrainian (Romanization)	Маліновський (Malinovskyi, Malinovskyy, Malinovskyj); Малиновський (Malynovskyi, Malynovskyy, Malynovskyj)	Маліновська (Malinovska); Малиновська (Malynovska)

== People ==
- Agnieszka Malinowska, Polish mathematician
- Andrzej Malinowski (general) (1954–2021), Polish Army general
- Andrzej Malinowski (born 1947), Polish artist, painter, graphic designer and illustrator
- Andrzej Malinowski (politician) (born 1947), Polish politician
- Bronisław Malinowski (1884–1942), Polish-British anthropologist
- Bronisław Malinowski (athlete) (1951–1981), Polish athlete
- Donald Malinowski (politician) (1924–2003), Canadian Catholic priest and politician
- Donald Malinowski (soccer), American soccer goalkeeper
- Ernest Malinowski (1818–1899), Polish engineer
- Franciszek Malinowski (disambiguation), multiple people
- Jay Malinowski (born 1982), Canadian vocalist and guitarist
- Kady Malinowski (born 1996), Polish-Brazilian footballer
- Lucjan Malinowski (1839–1898), Polish linguist
- Ludwik Malinowski (1887–1962), Polish Resistance fighter
- Marcin Malinowski (born 1975), Polish footballer
- Merlin Malinowski (born 1958), Canadian hockey player
- Piotr Malinowski (born 1984), Polish footballer
- Roman Malinowski (1935–2021), Polish politician
- Stan Malinowski (born 1936), American fashion photographer
- Stephen Malinowski (born 1953), American musician and software engineer
- Tadeusz Czesław Malinowski (1932–2018), Polish archaeologist and scientist
- Tom Malinowski (born 1965), American politician
- Wiktor Malinowski (born 1994), Polish poker player

== See also ==
- Władysław Pobóg-Malinowski (1899–1962), Polish soldier, historian and journalist
