= Defense of Przebraże =

Series of 1943 battles in Poland

Coordinates: 50.57°N 25.35°E

Defence of Przebraże
- Part of the Massacres of the Poles in the Volhynia and Galicia during the Polish–Ukrainian ethnic conflict in the World War II
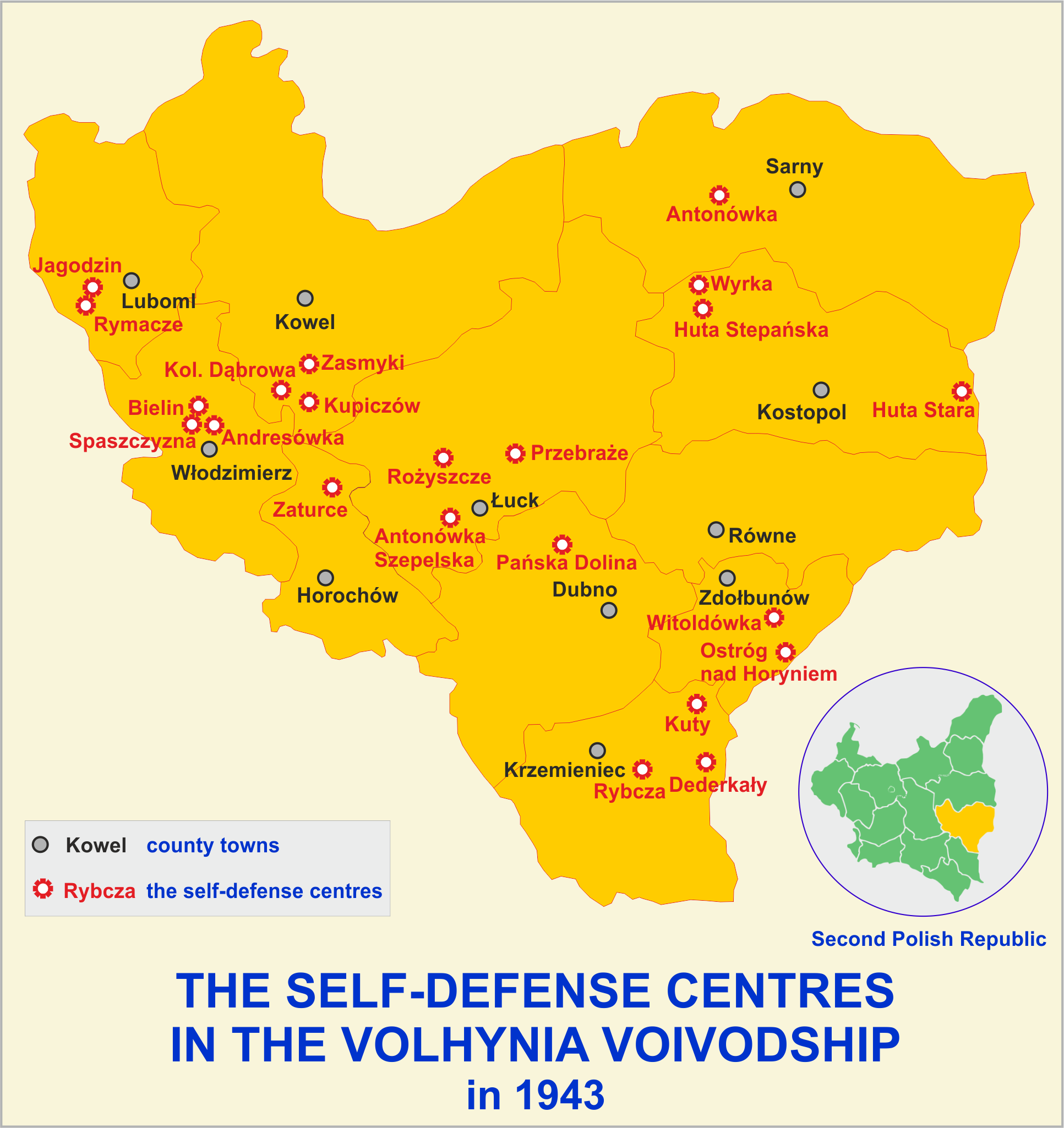
- The Polish Self–Defense bases and centers in the Wołyń Voivodeship in 1943
Date	4 July — 15 October 1943
Location	Przebraże, Łuck County, Wołyń Voivodeship
Result	Polish victory

Belligerents
Ukrainian Insurgent Army	Polish Self–Defense; Home Army; Soviet partisans

Commanders and leaders
Dmytro Klyachkivsky; Yuriy Stelmaschuk	Ludwik Malinowski; Albert Wasilewski; Henryk Cybulski; Jan Rerutko; Nikolay Prokopyuk

Units involved
Northern Operational Group: 3rd Operational Group "Turiv"; Fourth Companies of the Ukrainian Insurgent Army	Fourth Companies of the Polish Self–Defense; Partisan Detachment "Łuma" of the Home Army; Partisan Detachment "Drzazgi" of the Home Army; Cavalry Detachment of the Home Army; Armed Detachment of the Soviet partisans

Strength
4–5 July: 1,000 men 31 July: 3,500 men 30–31 August: 6,000 men 15 October: Unknown	4–5 July: 500 men 31 July: Unknown; 30–31 August: 1,467–1,667 men 15 October: Unknown

Casualties and losses
400 killed and wounded 40 captured	Unknown; 10 killed (on 5 of July)
- 550 Polish civilians were murdered

The Defence of Przebraże (Polish: Obrona Przebraża, Ukrainian: Оборона Пшебража; 4 July — 15 October 1943) was fought between the Ukrainian Insurgent Army against the Polish Self–Defense, Home Army and Soviet partisans in the Łuck County of the Wołyń Voivodeship. The Northern Operational Group under the command of Dmytro Klyachkivsky and 3rd Operational Group "Turiv" under the command of Yuriy Stelmaschuk tried four times to destroy and conquer the largest Polish Self–Defense base and center in the Volhynia, but the UPA didn't succeed.

== Location ==
The Przebraże settlement was located 10 km (6 mi) south of Troscianiec and 25 km (16 mi) north-east of Lutsk, the capital of Polish Volhynia before the Soviet invasion of Poland in agreement with Nazi Germany. The geographic area featured numerous peat bogs and forests. The Konopla river was to the west of the settlement. The population consisted of Poles, who had settled there in the 17th century. They were descendants of several szlachta (Polish nobility) families, that came to Volhynia from Mazowsze. The surrounding villages were inhabited mostly by ethnic Ukrainians. In 1938, Przebraże had 200 houses and some 1,150 inhabitants.

== Background ==
In late 1942, Ukrainian nationalists began attacks on Polish settlements in Volhynia (see: Massacres of Poles in Volhynia). Throughout 1943, these incidents moved westwards from one county to another, reaching the area of Kowel in May. The Polish population and the weak Volhynian units of the Polish Home Army were taken by surprise. After the initial shock, however, the Poles started to organize their own units to attack Ukrainians in turn. The Polish 27th Home Army Infantry Division was created out of these units.

=== Creation ===
Some time in April 1943, Poles in Przebraże under former officers 'Harry' Henryk Cybulski and Ludwik Malinowski (a veteran of the Polish–Soviet War), decided to create a self-defence force, which would help them to resist future Ukrainian attacks. The area in question was vast, with several surrounding smaller settlements, such as Cholopiny, Jazwiny, Mosty and Zagajnik. Sentries were posted, armed with weapons found in the fields after the border battles of the 1941 German invasion of the Soviet Union and Sten guns made by the Prżebraze gunsmithery. The regional Armia Krajowa also supplied arms and money so that Poles could buy weapons from corrupt Hungarian soldiers stationed in Volhynia. Two 45mm cannons were salvaged from Soviet tanks that had been destroyed in June 1941 and mounted on carriages. A train driver with AK contacts also delivered arms to the Polish railwaymen at Kiwerce, which were then transported to Przebraze.

To avoid clashes with the Germans, a weapon permit from local German authorities in Kiwerce was obtained. According to the memoirs of Henryk Cybulski, the German commander of Kiwerce was bribed with a pig and gold jewelry, after which he signed a document that stated: "Hereby authorized inhabitants of the village of Przebraże are allowed to use weapons to fight forest gangs, which harm [the] interests of the German Reich".

Polish units in Przebraże numbered some 500 men, they were divided into four companies and a mounted scouts platoon. In mid-1943 their number grew to 1,000. Reconnaissance patrols would check the surrounding area by day and at night, so that the settlement would not be caught by surprise. A defence line was created around Przebraże and neighbouring settlements, which consisted of foxholes and barbed wire. The length of barbed wire totalled around 20 km (12 mi) and the size of the "camp" - 6 km (3.7 mi) from east to west and 7 km (4.3 mi) from north to south.

=== Population in 1943 ===
As news of atrocities spread across Volhynia, up to 28,000 Poles from neighbouring villages and settlements came to Przebraże. The number of refugees grew day by day; several houses accommodated up to five families, others had to live in temporary mud huts. A field hospital was organized and as skirmishes with Ukrainians were frequent, beds were usually full.

In June 1943 Polish units from Przebraże scouted the area, telling all Poles to leave their houses and move to the fortified settlement. Unfortunately, not all agreed to move and their reluctance later proved to be fatal.

== Ukrainian attacks ==
At the beginning of the summer of 1943, local Ukrainian Insurgent Army (UPA) commanders suggested that Henryk Cybulski, Ludwik Malinowski and their men should meet and talk. Delegates of both sides met four times, the Poles grew suspicious. Reportedly, the talks were a trap, the Ukrainians wanted to kill Cybulski. Thus, negotiations were terminated.

=== July 5, 1943 attack ===
The first attack of the Ukrainian Insurgent Army on Przebraże took place on 5 July 1943. According to Władysław Filar, it was carried out with a force of around 1,000 men. It was preceded by a strike on the night of 4–5 July on more than 20 defenceless Polish villages located around Przebraże. Polish houses in the surrounding Ukrainian villages were also burnt down. The losses of the Polish civilian population on that night are estimated at around 550 murdered. The survivors fled to Przebraże.

At 3:00 a.m., UPA units attacked an outpost in Zagajnik from the north, forcing a self-defence platoon to withdraw. Several fires broke out as a result of the exchange of fire, causing panic among the population of Przebraże. The Ukrainians were only repelled by a counter-attack by a retreating platoon under the command of Henryk Cybulski. The exchange of fire also continued in the eastern section. At around 11:00 a.m. the UPA shelled Chołopiny with mortars, causing the buildings to catch fire.

The attacks carried out were only reconnaissance fighting. The main enemy forces were not thrown into battle, probably because of the strong resistance put up by the defenders of Przebraże. In the evening of 5 July, the attackers retreated towards Kolki. A total of 10 Poles were killed in the battle, with one dead and six wounded on the UPA side. The first attack by the Ukrainian Insurgent Army made the self-defence command realise the scale of the threat and demonstrated the shortcomings and deficiencies of the defence system. It became apparent that shelters and entanglements were particularly lacking, the condition of the trenches needed to be improved and the north-eastern section reinforced. It was also necessary to dislocate the self-defence forces and intensify patrolling of the foreground.

=== Other attacks ===
A second attack took place on July 12, the UPA concentrated its forces on the village of Rafalowka. The Polish side managed to force the enemy to flee, but this was not the end. As Henryk Cybulski wrote in his memoirs, throughout the summer of 1943 the "war for grain" persisted. The number of Poles in Przebraże was too high and its defenders realized that it was impossible to feed so many people. Thus, in April and July 1943, Polish peasants, guarded by patrols, were harvesting crops, transporting it to the settlement. The Ukrainians would attack the peasants, killing several.

A real battle during the harvest occurred on 31 July 1943 near Chmielówka and Jaromla. The 3rd company from Przebraż, covering the harvesters, clashed with an UPA patrol, killing two Ukrainians. The Upowcy retreated, but from the direction of Chmielówka the Poles were attacked by a large UPA unit. The 3rd company of self-defence retreated to the edge of the Jaromelski forest, where it repulsed fierce attacks by the UPA. Their numbers could have been as high as 3.5 thousand, including 2.5 thousand with firearms.

The last major attack took place on August 31, 1943. Ukrainian forces numbered around 10,000 men, including a 4,000 strong unit from the area of Lviv and 5,000 drafted local peasants, armed with axes and scythes.. They worked out a detailed plan of attack (codename "Kublo"); their headquarters were established in the village of Swozie.

Helped by artillery, they attacked from the south. The Przebraże defenders asked local Home Army units and the Soviet partisan forces of Nikolay Prokopiuk for help, (the latter were numerous in the area and themselves threatened by Ukrainians). They joined the Poles. As a result, the UPA, attacked from the rear, withdrew, losing more than 100 men and abandoning a large quantity of arms.

== Polish counterattacks ==
To prevent attacks on Przebraże, the self-defence forces conducted counter-attacks on UPA bases situated in villages close to the base, which constantly posed a gravely threat to its security. On 12 July 1943 after the first attack on the base, Henryk Cybulski led 3 companies on a raid on the UPA base in the village of Trościaniec, which lay 7 km to the north, destroying it and dispersing the UPA garrison. On 2 August 1943 a raid destroyed the UPA base at Jaromla, which lay 5 km to the north east.

At the end of September, 1943 a 100-man unit from Przebraże, with the soldiers of the Rafałówka and Komarówek self-defences, conducted a joint counter-attack which destroyed the UPA base at Hauczyce, 8 km south of Przebraże, eliminating a constant threat to Rafałówka. A raid against the UPA NCO training school in Omelno on 5 October 1943 was carried out as a joint operation with colonel's Prokopiuk unit. Taking part in it were 300 Polish troops and 150 Soviet partisans, against 200 UPA troops, including 120 UPA students at the school. The school was destroyed, but UPA lost over 10 men only. A similar action was undertaken on the night of 27/8 October 1943 when a joint party with Prokopiuk's partisans attacked Słowatycz. UPA losses were several dozen men. A 100 Uzbek deserters from the German Army, who were serving in the UPA forces were taken prisoner and went over to the Soviet partisans.

A raid against UPA was undertaken around Żurawicz on 26 November 1943. It had a significant impact on the supply of provisions for Przebraże. After obtaining reconnaissance reports that Ukrainian nationalists in Żurawicz held over 1,000 requisitioned cattle, a large force of about 740 defenders of Przebraże struck the village, seizing the cattle and large quantities of flour and grain. On 31 December 1943 after receiving intelligence information about the upcoming attack on Przebraże, the same unit ambushed a large force of UPA troops moving south on the road to Przebraże. Taken by surprise the UPA troops fled in disorder suffering many losses.

== Aftermath ==
In February 1944, Volhynia was occupied by the Red Army. As the UPA was considered an enemy of the Soviet regime, the Soviet military forces put a stop to the attacks by the UPA.

In 1945 Poles from this part of Volhynia were forced by Soviet authorities to move to the area of Niemodlin, in Opole Voivodeship, the land that had belonged to Germany before the war.

In 2004 Ukrainian authorities cleaned the Polish cemetery. A victory flag, woven by women from Przebraże in September 1943, can be seen in the Museum of the Polish Army in Warsaw.

== See also ==
- Ludwik Malinowski
- Henryk Cybulski
- Kuty (Kąty) defence
- 14th Waffen Grenadier Division of the SS Galizien (1st Ukrainian)
- 27th Polish Home Army Infantry Division
- Operation Vistula
- Anti-Polonism
- Huta Stepanska
- Janowa Dolina
- Koliyivschyna
- Nachtigall
- Operation Tempest
- Pawłokoma massacre
- Poryck Massacre

== Sources ==
- Władysław Filar, Przebraże bastion polskiej samoobrony na Wołyniu, Rytm Oficyna Wydawnicza, 2007. ISBN 978-83-7399-339-6
- Henryk Cybulski, Czerwone noce "O powstaniu i przetrwaniu organizacji samoobrony ludnosci polskiej we wsi Przebraże na Wolyniu w latach 1943-1944". Wyd. MON, Warszawa 1969 r., wyd. I. stron 377
- Grzegorz Motyka. Ukrainska partyzantka 1942-1960. Rytm Oficyna Wydawnicza, 2006. ISBN 83-7399-163-8. Przebraze: strony 328-329, 339, 349.
- Józef Sobiesiak, Prżebraże. Wyd. MON. Warszawa 1969 r. Wyd. I,. wyd. II 1971.
- Filip Ozarowski, Gdy plonal Wolyn, Chicago 1996, ISBN 0-9655488-0-5
- Apoloniusz Zawilski, Polskie fronty 1918-1945, t. 1, Warszawa 1997, ISBN 83-86857-23-4
