= Henryk Pająk =

Polish writer, journalist and publisher (born 1937)

Henryk Pająk (born 1937) is a Polish writer, journalist and publisher.

== Biography ==
Coming from a peasant family living in the back country, Pająk nevertheless went on to study philology at the Maria Curie-Skłodowska University in the city. He then became a teacher of the Polish language in a gymnasium and contributed to a farm newspaper in Lublin (Sztandar Ludu). In 1965, he founded a poets association in 1965 called "Prom". In 1969, he compiled Henryk Cybulski's memoirs, Czerwone noce (Red nights) about Przebraże Defence, the self-defence of Poles against the Ukrainian UPA. Pająk then wrote a novel based on this subject matter, Los (Fate) in 1969.

A prolific writer, Henryk Pająk wrote many novels and poems which made him notable locally, such as Druga śmierć (Second death) in 1971, Tam, za snem (There, for sleep) in 1991 (received 2 literary awards) or Wolny (Free) in 1992. He also headed the Lublin's section of the Polish union of writers (Związek Literatów Polskich). Under the communist regime, he was a member of the PZPR but left it during the Martial law in 1981.

After the collapse of communism, he created a book publishing company, « Wydawnictwo Retro ». Since he has written many books, such as a book about the Polish communist regime in 1997 (Rządy zbirów 1940-1990 [Governments of criminals]), written with Stanisław Żochowski (one of the NSZ confunders), or a biography of Józef Piłsudski (Ponura prawda o Piłsudskim [Gloomy truth about Piłsudski], in 2005). He also wrote a well-documented inquiry on the former communist secret police — the UB-SB — in 3 volumes (1993-94). Following the publication of this book, he was called to testify for the new intelligence agency UOP.

== Works ==
- Los, 1969 (Fate)
- Druga śmierć, 1971 (Second death)
- Pęknięty świat, 1972 (Broken world)
- Zerwanie, 1976
- Posłuchaj Moniko, 1977 (Listen Monika)
- Druga śmierć, 1981 (Second death)
- Za cieniem cień, 1989 (Shadow after shadow)
- Tam, za snem, 1991 (There, behind the dream)
- Wolny, 1992 (Free)
- Zbrodnie UB – NKWD, 1991 (Crimes of UB - NKVD)
- „Uskok” kontra UB, 1992 („Uskok” versus UB)
- „Burta” kontra UB, 1992 („Burta” versus UB)
- „Jastrząb” kontra UB, 1993 („Jastrząb” versus UB)
- „Żelazny” kontra UB, 1993 („Żelazny” versus UB)
- Za samostijną Ukrainę, 1993 (For free Ukraine)
- Urbana NIE w wojnie z Kościołem katolickim, 1993 (Urban's NIE at war with Catholic Church)
- Oni się nigdy nie poddali, 1997 (They never gave up)
- Strach być Polakiem, 1997 (Fear to be Polish)
- Rządy zbirów 1940-1990, 1997 with Stanisław Żochowski, (Rule of thugs 1940-1990)
- Piąty rozbiór Polski 1990–2000, 1998 (V partition of Poland 1990-2000)
- Żydowskie oblężenie Oświęcimia, 1999 (Jewish siege of Auschwitz)
- Czas skorpionów
- Dwa wieki polskiej Golgoty czyli Samotni wśród łotrów, 1999 (Two centuries of Polish Calvary, Alone among scumbags)
- A Naród śpi!, 2000 (And Nation sleeps!)
- Polska w bagnie, 2001 (Poland in swamp)
- Jedwabne geszefty, 2001 (Jedwabne's geszefts)
- Bestie końca czasu, 2001 (Beasts of the end of time)
- Trzecia wojna światowa, 2002 (World War Third)
- Złodziej milionów, 2002. (Thief of millions)
- Bandytyzm NATO, 2003 (NATO's banditism)
- Z Łagru do Eurołagru, 2003 (From gulag to Eurogulag)
- Niemieckie ludobójstwo na polskim narodzie, 2004 (German genocide on Polish nation)
- Retinger. Mason i agent syjonizmu, 2004 (Retinger. Freemason and agent of Zionism)
- Bestie końca czasu, 2005 (Beasts of the end of time)
- Ponura prawda o Piłsudskim, 2005 (Gloomy truth about Piłsudski)
- Dwa wieki polskiej Golgoty czyli Samotni wśród łotrów, 2005 (Two centuries of Polish Calvary, Alone among scumbags)
- Jedwabne geszefty, 2005 (Jedwabne's geszefts)
- Nowotwory Watykanu, 2005 (Vatican's tumors)
- Dyktatura nietykalnych, 2006 (Dictatorship of untouchables)
- Grabarze polskiej nadziei 1980–2005, 2007 (Gravediggers of Polish hope)
- Rosja we krwi i nafcie 1905–2005, 2007 (Russia in blood and oil)
- Prosto w ślepia, 2007 (Straight in eyes)
- Kundlizm znów wygrał, 2008 (Kundlizm won again)
