= Malinauskas =

- Lithuanian surname
- m.: Malinauskas
- f.: (unmarried): Malinauskaitė
- f.: (married): Malinauskienė
- f.: (short): Malinauskė
- Origin: Lithuanized Slavic surname ultimtately derived from malina, "raspberry"
- Related names: Polish: Malinowski, Russian: Malinovsky/Malinovski

Malinauskas is a Lithuanian language family name. It may refer to:

- Donatas Malinauskas (1877–1942), Lithuanian politician and diplomat
- Liudmila Malinauskaitė-Šliūpienė, Lithuanian poet
- Mindaugas Malinauskas (born 1983), Lithuanian football goalkeeper
- Peter Malinauskas (born 1980), Australian politician, premier of South Australia from 21 March 2022
- Joe Malin, (born Joe Malinauskas, 1988), Scottish football goalkeeper
