= Ludwik Malinowski (resistance fighter) =

Polish resistance fighter

- Born: 18 August 1889; Ksawerów, Russian Empire
- Died: 18 June 1962 (aged 72); Niemodlin, Polish People's Republic
- Military career
- Allegiance: Second Polish Republic; Polish People's Republic
- Branch: Puławy Legion; Polish Armed Forces; Home Army; Polish People's Army
- Rank: Porucznik (First lieutenant)
- Nickname: Lew
- Units: 1st Krechowce Uhlan Regiment; 27th Volhynian Infantry Division; 1st Polish Army
- Conflicts: First World War; Second World War
- Awards

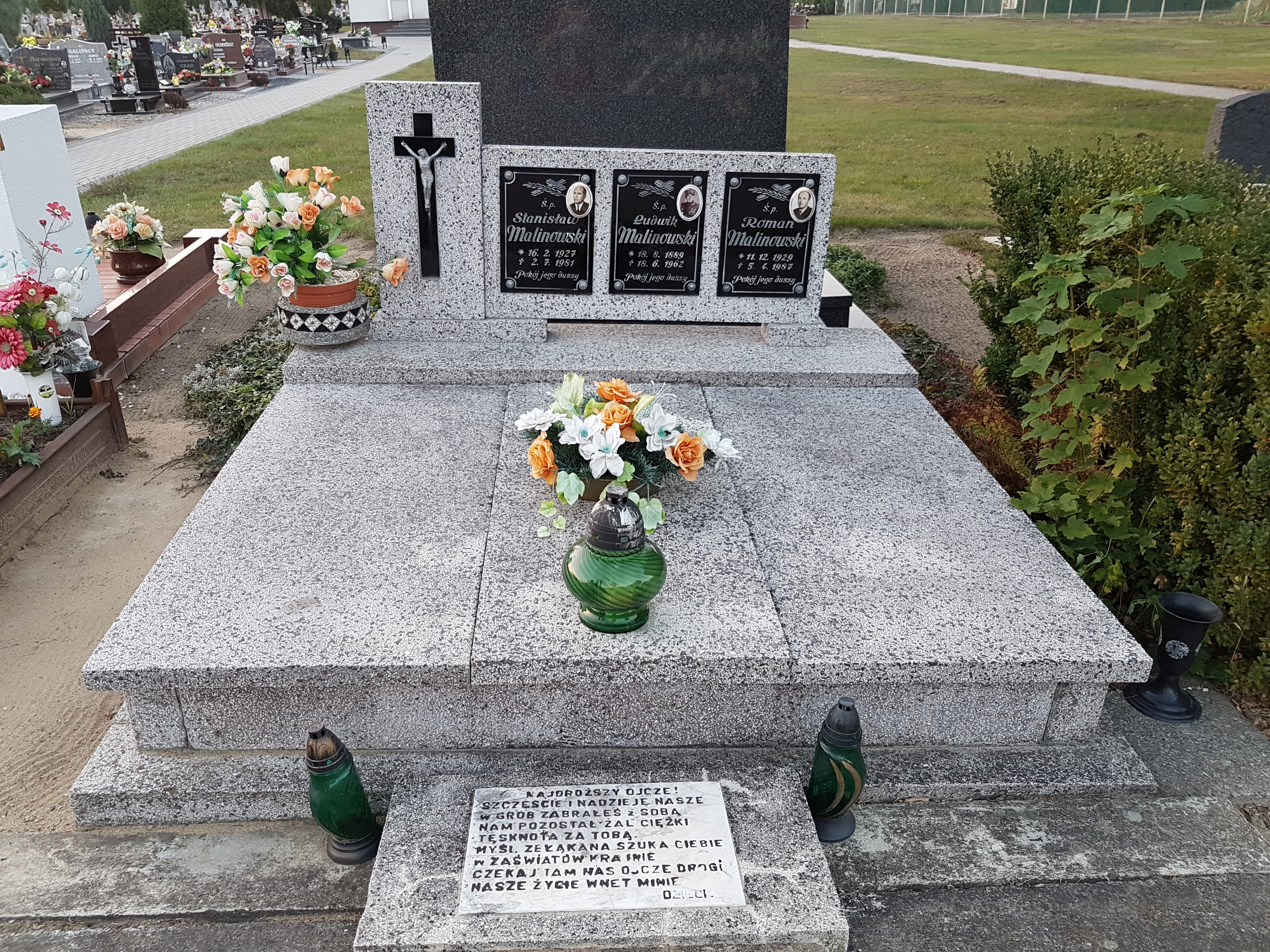
Tomb of Ludwik Malinowski, Stanisław Malinowski and Roman Malinowski the cemetery in Niemodlin, Poland.

Ludwik Malinowski (nom de guerre Lew of Przebraze, 1887-1962) was a Polish resistance fighter.

== Biography ==
He was born in 1887 in the village of Ksawerów near Łódź, was a Polish Resistance fighter. As a teenager he worked in a textile factory in Łódź. In 1910, drafted to the Imperial Russian Army, went to Yaroslavl on the Volga river, where he served in the 181st Regiment.

During World War I, Malinowski was wounded, then voluntarily joined the 1st Polish Regiment of the Krechowce Uhlans. In 1919 he settled in the Volhynian village of Przebraze, where worked as a farmer, but also was an activist of the Polish Socialist Party. In the fall of 1939, following German and Soviet aggression on Poland, Volhynia was incorporated into the Soviet Union. Thousands of Poles were forcibly deported to Siberia and other areas of the empire. Malinowski was spared.

On June 22, 1941, Germany attacked Soviet Union. New wave of terror in Volhynia began, this time the Soviets were replaced by the Nazis and Ukrainian nationalists. In mid-1942 a group of young Poles were taken away to Germany, where they worked in factories. In this group were two Malinowski’s sons. His son lutzian escaped and immigrated to Australia and had 2 children. His other son was never located again.

In October 1942 first Ukrainian attacks on Polish settlements started (see: Massacres of Poles in Volhynia). In January 1943, Poles from Przebraze decided to organize their own defence, headed by Ludwik Malinowski, whose military experience would prove priceless in the future. Under skillful leadership, the Poles quickly organized themselves and Przebraże Defence became a symbol of Polish resistance against Ukrainian nationalists, who were murdering Poles. As Poles were not allowed to have weapons, Malinowski bribed local German civil servant in Kiwerce, who gave him 15 guns. Then, he bought weapons from Hungarian soldiers, stationed in Volhynia.

In the summer of 1943 Ukrainian attacks on Poles in Volhynia became very frequent, thousands were murdered. Malinowski knew about this, and, together with Henryk Cybulski, he turned Przebraze into an improvised fortress, which covered neighboring Polish settlements with the area of some 30 km^{2}. In June 1943 Malinowski ordered that inhabitants of all Polish villages in the area should move to Przebraze. Some Poles disobeyed, soon afterwards they were murdered by the Ukrainians.

On July 4, 1943, Przebraze was attacked. Malinowski gave an outstanding example, fighting on the front line. After the attack, more Poles came to the fortress, whose population grew to 20,000. Malinowski took care of all those who needed help, and when on August 30, the Ukrainians attacked again, his stance, courage and faith in victory boosted the morale of defenders and the Ukrainians were repelled.

Soon afterwards, Malinowski was arrested by the Gestapo. The Germans found out that Poles had been helped by Soviet partisan units, that were stationing in the Volhynian forests. Incarcerated in the Lutsk prison, Malinowski did not break down and during the investigation, German authorities did not find enough evidence to support their claim and - to the surprise of all, Malinowski was released. Unfortunately, after release, the Pole was caught by the Ukrainians, who wanted him for commanding the defence of Przebraze. Polish units made a quick decision. A group of Home Army soldiers attacked a Ukrainian police quarters in Lutsk and after a bitter fight, they rescued severely beaten, unconscious Malinowski, who was then taken to Kiwerce and treated by a doctor.

When Red Army pushed Wehrmacht out of Volhynia (early 1944), Malinowski joined Ludowe Wojsko Polskie, and fought as a sergeant in Kolobrzeg and Berlin. After the war, he settled in Niemodlin. Communist authorities treated him with suspicion, he was imprisoned and tortured, after 1956 his fate got better. He died in 1962 in Niemodlin.

== Awards and decorations ==
- Gold Cross of Merit
- Cross of Valour
- Partisan Cross
- Bronze Cross of Merit with Swords
- Silver Medal for Merit on the Field of Glory
- Medal for Warsaw 1939–1945
- Medal for Oder, Neisse and Baltic
- Medal of Victory and Freedom 1945
- Medal of the 10th Anniversary of People's Poland
- Medal "For the Victory over Germany in the Great Patriotic War 1941–1945"
- Medal "For the Capture of Berlin"
- Medal "For the Liberation of Warsaw"

== See also ==
- Przebraże Defence
- Henryk Cybulski
- History of Poland (1939–1945)

== Sources ==
- Władysław Filar, Przebraże bastion polskiej samoobrony na Wołyniu, Rytm Oficyna Wydawnicza, 2007. ISBN 978-83-7399-254-2
