= Battle of Stężarzyce =

1944 Polish-Ukrainian clash

- Part of the Polish–Ukrainian conflict and Eastern Front of World War II
Date	20 February 1944
Location	Stężarycze,Volyn Oblast
Result	Polish victory
Territorial changes	Capture of Stężarzyce by Poles

Belligerents
Ukrainian Insurgent Army	Home Army

Commanders and leaders
Unknown	Sylwester Brokowski

Units involved
Unspecified	27th Volhynian Infantry Division: "Bogorii" unit; "Lecha" unit

Strength
Unknown	2 companies

Casualties and losses
23 killed	1 killed

The Battle of Stężarzyce or Attack of Stężarzyce took place between the Ukrainian Insurgent Army and the Home Army in the Volyn Oblast, in Stężarycze, It took place on February 20, 1944.

== Prelude ==
On February 11, 1944, a Polish assault group from the “Osnowa” Group of the 27th Volhynian Home Army Division, commanded by Lieutenant Sylwester Brokowski “Bogoria,” planned an attack on Stężarzyce to remove UPA forces from the village, as another attack on nearby Polish settlements was expected from this area. However, the UPA detected the approaching Polish unit, and the village was abandoned before the assault. One UPA member was killed.

Several days later, UPA forces returned to Stężarzyce, which served as an important base, and established defensive fortifications there.

== Battle ==
On the night of February 20–21, 1944, two Polish battalions, “Lech” and “Bogoria”, reached the area of Stęzarzyce from the direction of Puzów, taking advantage of a snowstorm. Despite taking precautions, the forces were spotted by a UPA outpost, leading to a direct assault.

The main attack targeted several fortified positions, including the brickyard, school, and church. The brickyard was captured relatively quickly, while the fighting at the school and church was more intense. To break through the school’s defenses, the attackers used smoke created by setting fire to a nearby barn and pile of straw. This provided cover for Polish soldiers to approach the defensive positions and enter the building.

After about four hours of fighting, the school was captured, and some UPA defenders withdrew toward the forests and the Bug River. According to the cited source, 23 Ukrainians were killed in the fighting at Stęzarzyce. The “Bogoria” detachment positioned in an ambush near Mosur did not take part in the fighting. Due to the severe frost, some Polish soldiers suffered frostbite.

== Aftermath ==
After Stęzarzyce was captured, the Polish forces left a platoon-sized outpost in the village, thereby expanding the operational area of the “Osnowa” Group.

== Bibliography ==
- Turowski, Józef (1990). walki 27 Wołyńskiej Dywizji AK (in Polish). State Publisher. Nauk. ISBN 8301084650.
- Filar, Władysław (2011). "DZIAŁANIA 27 WOŁYŃSKIEJ DYWIZJI PIECHOTY ARMII KRAJOWEJ CZĘŚĆ 1" (PDF) (in Polish). Warsaw.
- Siemaszko, Władysław; Siemaszko, Ewa (2000). Ludobójstwo dokonane przez nacjonalistów ukraińskich na ludności polskiej Wołynia 1939–1945 [Genocide committed by Ukrainian nationalists on the Polish population of Volhynia] (in Polish). Warsaw: Von Borowiecky. ISBN 83-87689-34-3.
