= Henryk Cybulski =

Polish resistance fighter (1910–1971)

Henryk Cybulski (1 October 1910 – 12 March 1971) was a Polish resistance leader.

Born in the Volhynian village of Przebraże, he worked as a forester, when in September 1939 the Red Army invaded eastern Poland. Cybulski was forcibly deported by the Soviets to Siberia on 10 February 1940. In the summer of 1940 he managed to escape and, after walking for eight weeks, returned to Volhynia. As he later wrote, his sports experiences in long-distance running were a great help. Upon coming back, he took up several menial jobs, trying to lie low and not to attract attention of Soviet authorities.

In August 1942, Cybulski joined the Home Army. In early spring of 1943, at the beginning of Massacres of Poles in Volhynia by the Ukrainian Insurgent Army (UPA), he became one of the commandants of the Przebraże Defence together with Ludwik Malinowski. Under his leadership, Polish resistance groups reorganised into a 500-man-strong brigade, including a cavalry unit. Przebraże became a fortress, in which up to 25,000 people lived.

Together with his soldiers they fought off Ukrainian attacks on Przebraże and, in the second half of 1943, initiated several raids on Ukrainian nationalist centres, including an attack on UPA's military college in Trostianets. Cybulski began actively cooperating with Soviet partisan forces present in Volhynia; when the Red Army entered into Volhynia, he joined a Red Army unit, but soon left after learning that the NKVD was going to arrest him.

His after-war whereabouts remain unknown. In 1969 Cybulski issued a book Czerwone noce ("Red nights"), worked out by Henryk Pająk, based on his memoirs, in which he described Ukrainian massacres of Poles in early 1940s Volhynia.

== See also ==
- Przebraże Defence
- Ludwik Malinowski

== Sources ==
- Cybulski H., Czerwone noce. Wyd. 5 zm. Bellona, Warszawa 1990, ss. 375. Opracowanie literackie H. Pająk. ISBN 83-11-07834-3
- Władysław Filar, Przebraże bastion polskiej samoobrony na Wołyniu. Bitwy i akcje. Wyd. Rytm, Warszawa 2007, ss. 128. Seria: Biblioteka Armii Krajowej, ISBN 978-83-7399-254-2
