= Maksym Skorupsky =

Ukrainian army commander

- Born: November 29, 1912; Antonivtsi, Volhynian Governorate, Russian Empire
- Died: December 11, 1985 (aged 73); Trenton, New Jersey, United States
- Military career
- Allegiance: Organization of Ukrainian Nationalists Melnyk faction
- Service years: 1938–1944
- Rank: Commander
- Conflicts: World War II

Maksym Skorupsky (Ukrainian: Максим Скорупський; also known by his pseudonym Maks) (November 12, 1912 – December 11, 1985) was a Ukrainian military leader of the Ukrainian Insurgent Army.

== Biography ==
Born in the village of Antonivtsi, Volhynian Governorate, Russian Empire (now Ternopil Oblast, Ukraine), he studied at the Lviv University before his studies were terminated and he was called up for military service in the Polish Army. Skorupsky was not a member of OUN, but was a supporter of Andriy Melnyk. He was an officer in the Ukrainian Insurgent Army (UIA) known under the name "Maks" in UIA-South. In 1943 he operated in area south of Rivne in the military group (division) “Bohun”. On May 3, he participated in the assault on Polish village Kuty during the massacres of Poles in Volhynia. At least 53 Poles were killed. On February 29, 1944, Skorupsky took part in the attack on Nikolai Vatutin, a battle near the village of Myliatyn against the group SMERSH.

On 12 March 1944, kurin of the Ukrainian Insurgent Army under his command murdered Poles in Pidkamin. Estimates of victims include 150 and more than 250.

Skorupsky took part in the Battle at Hurby, April 21–25, 1944, against soldiers of the NKVD, which was a tactical win for the NKVD. After the battle, the NKVD burned down the villages of Hurby and Antonivets.

In 1944, he emigrated to Austria and from there in 1948 to the United States, where he settled in New Jersey. He died in Trenton, New Jersey. Skorupsky is known for numerous published articles of reminiscences regarding his activities in the UIA and his book of memoirs, Туди, де бiй за волю ("There, where there is a battle for freedom").

== Sources ==
- Encyclopedia of Ukraine, Vol. IV, University of Toronto Press, 1993.
- Encyclopedia of the history of UIA (Eнциклопедія історії УПА)
- М. Сивіцький. Записки сірого волиняка. Львів, 1996.
- П. Содоль. Українська Повстанча Армія 1943-49. Довідник. Нью-Йорк, «Пролог» 1994.
- Skorupsky, M.A. (Maks). (in Ukrainian)
- Туди де бій за волю ("Where the battle for freedom is") : (Спогади Курінного УПА Максима Скорупського-Макса) / М.А. Скорупський, Макс. - К. : Вид-во ім. Олени Теліги, 1992. - 351 с. -
