= Malinovsky =

Malinovsky (Russian: Малиновский; masculine) or Malinovskaya (Малиновская; feminine) is a Slavic surname.

Notable people with the surname include:

- Mikhail Malinovsky, Hero of the Soviet Union
- Rodion Malinovsky (1898–1967), Soviet military commander and the Defense Minister of the Soviet Union
- Roman Malinovsky (1876–1918), agent provocateur of the Okhrana
- Vasily Demut-Malinovsky (1779–1846), Russian sculptor
- Vasily Malinovsky (1765–1814), Russian publicist and enlightener
- Vera Malinovskaya (1900–1988), Russian actress
- Malinovsky, real last name of Alexander Bogdanov (1873–1928), Russian physician, philosopher, economist, science fiction writer, and revolutionary

== See also ==
- Malinowski, variants of this last name in related languages
- Malinovsky (urban-type settlement), an urban-type settlement in Khanty–Mansi Autonomous Okrug, Russia
- Malinovsky, Altai Krai
