= Franciszek Malinowski =

Franciszek Malinowski may refer to:

- Franciszek Malinowski (activist) (1897–1944), Polish activist, communist and politician
- Franciszek Malinowski (journalist) (1931–2014), Polish journalist, philologist and scholar
