= Certified officer =

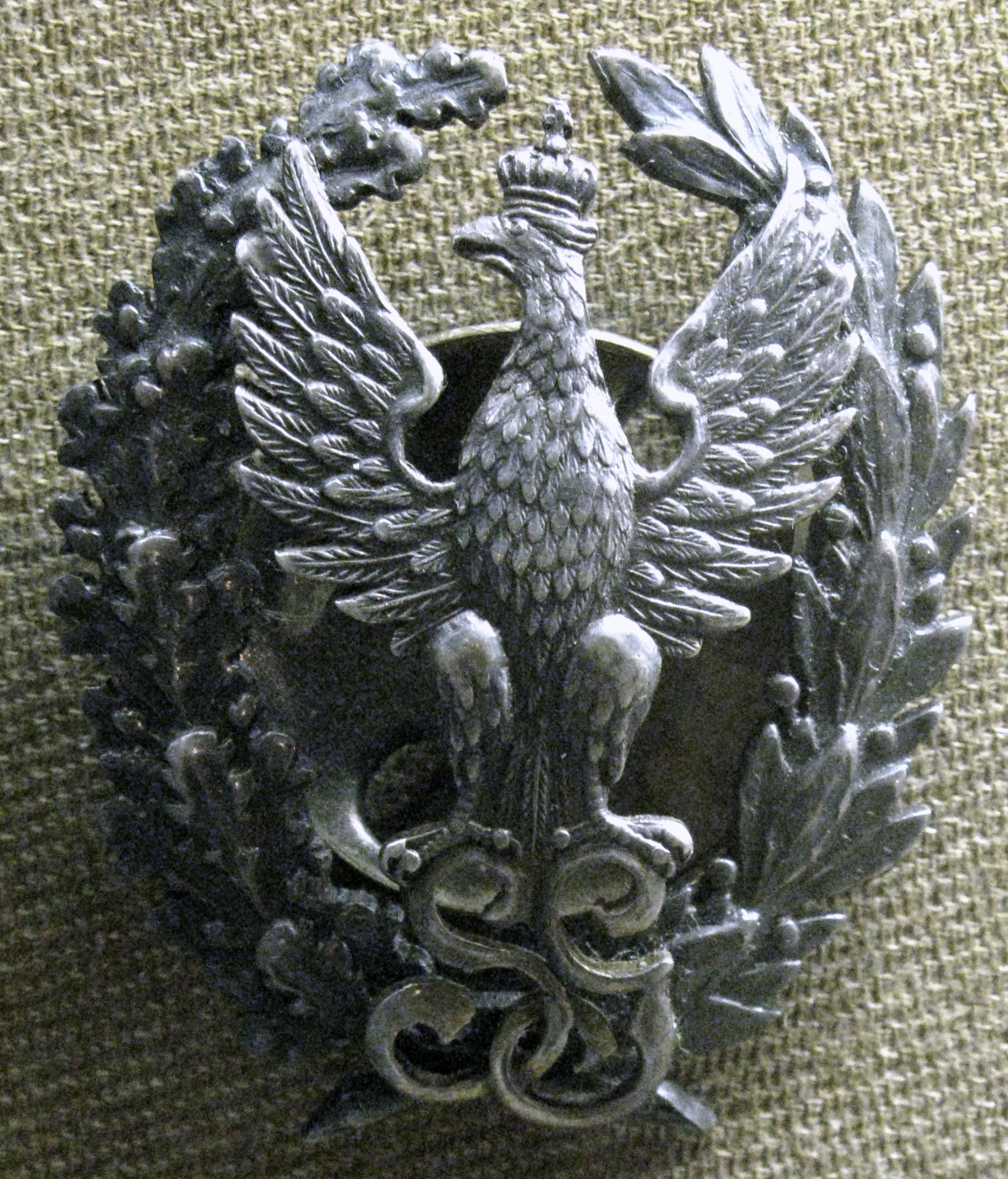
Badge of a certified officer of the General Staff of the Second Polish Republic

In Polish Armed Forces, a certified officer (Polish: Oficer dyplomowany) in a military title assigned to an officer after graduation of the corresponding military school. In addressing (in Polish), the title immediately follows the officer's military rank, e.g. "płk dypl." (pułkownik dyplomowany, certified colonel).

In the Second Polish Republic the title was awarded to the graduates of Wyższa Szkoła Wojenna (Higher Military School). In the Polish People's Republic this title was reintroduced in 1958 for the graduates of the Świerczewski General Staff Academy

In the modern Republic of Poland the title was awarded to the graduates of the commanders' and staff courses of the National Defence University of Warsaw. The title was abandoned after the reorganization of Polish military and reintroduced in 2017 for the graduates of Postgraduate Operational-Tactic Studies of the War Studies Academy (full title: "oficer dyplomowany Sił Zbrojnych Rzeczypospolitej Polskiej", abbreviated as "dypl. SZ RP")

== See also ==
- Category: Certified officers of the Second Polish Republic, in Polish Wikipedia
