= Monument to the 27th Volhynian Infantry Division of the Home Army =

Monument in Warsaw, Poland

Monument to the Volhynia 27th Home Army Infantry Division
- Pomnik 27 Wołyńskiej Dywizji Piechoty AK w Warszawa
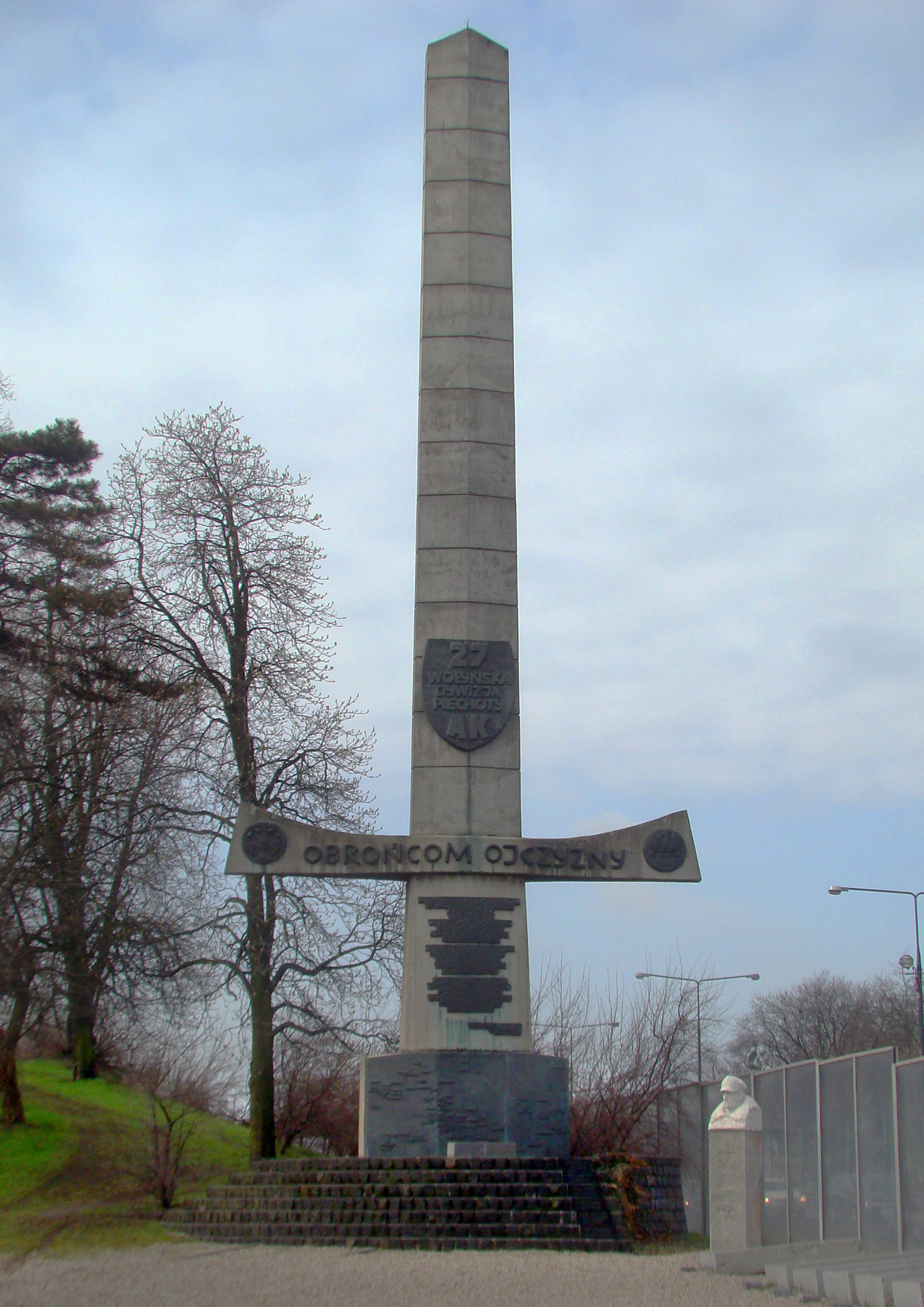
- The monument adjacent to Trasa Armii Krajowej
- Interactive map of Monument to the Volhynia 27th Home Army Infantry Division
- Location: Warsaw
- Coordinates: 52°16′32.58″N 20°58′17.65″E
- Designer: Kazimierz Danilewicz
- Material: Stone
- Completion date: 12 September 1993
- Dedicated to: Obroncom ojczyzny (Defenders of the homeland)

The Monument to the 27th Volhynian Infantry Division of the Home Army is located in Volhynian Square beside the main thoroughfare Trasa Armii Krajowej in northern Warsaw. It commemorates the contribution of the Armia Krajowa's 27th Infantry Division during World War II, especially fighting the Ukrainian Insurgent Army at the time of the Volhynia massacres.

The memorial was designed by sculptor Kazimierz Danilewicz (who was born in Volhynia). It was unveiled on 12 September 1993. The monument is shaped like a large stone sword.

On the 13 July 2003 a set of 11 stone column "candles" was unveiled, commemorating the martyrdom of Poles from Volhynia's 11 counties, the victims of the Volhynia massacres. Each column has a coat of arms and a name of a county from Volhynia. The columns are terminated with a "wick" - the columns are illuminated from below with lights hidden in the pavement.

To the right of the monument is a bust of General Jan Wojciech Kiwerski, a leader of the infantry division, who died during the war.

== Gallery ==
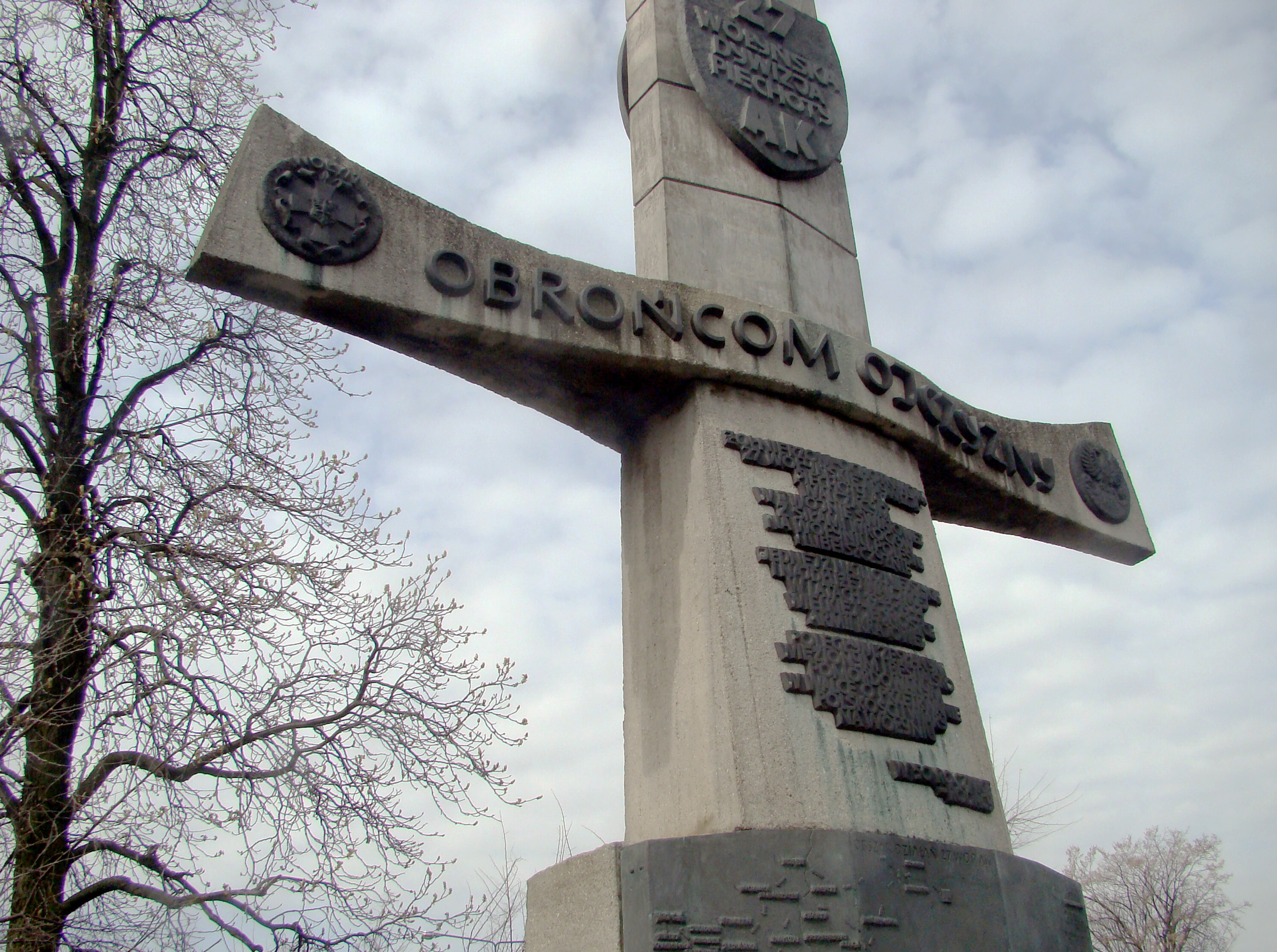
A view of the monument

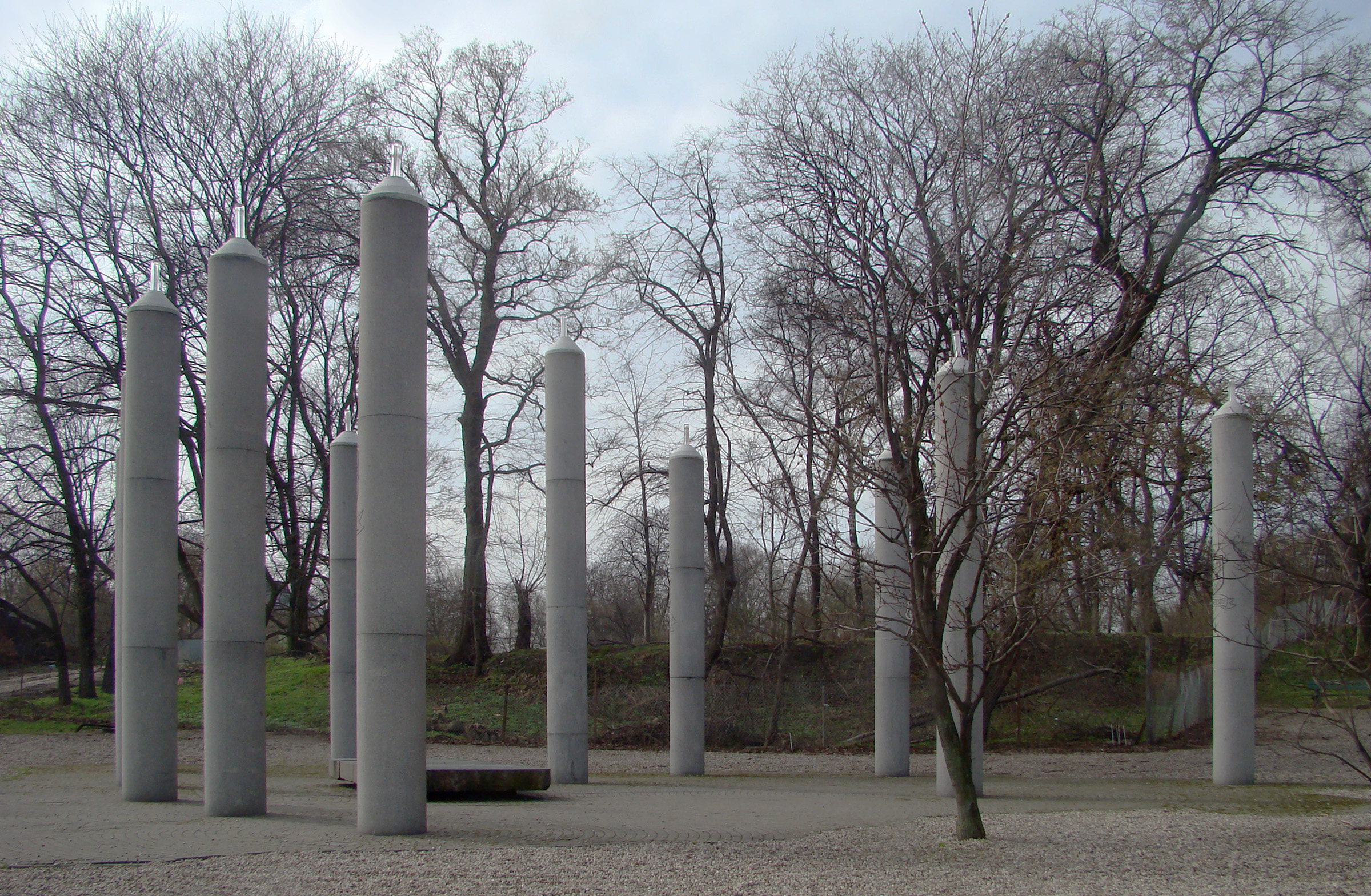
A view of the columns commemorating the victims at Volhynia

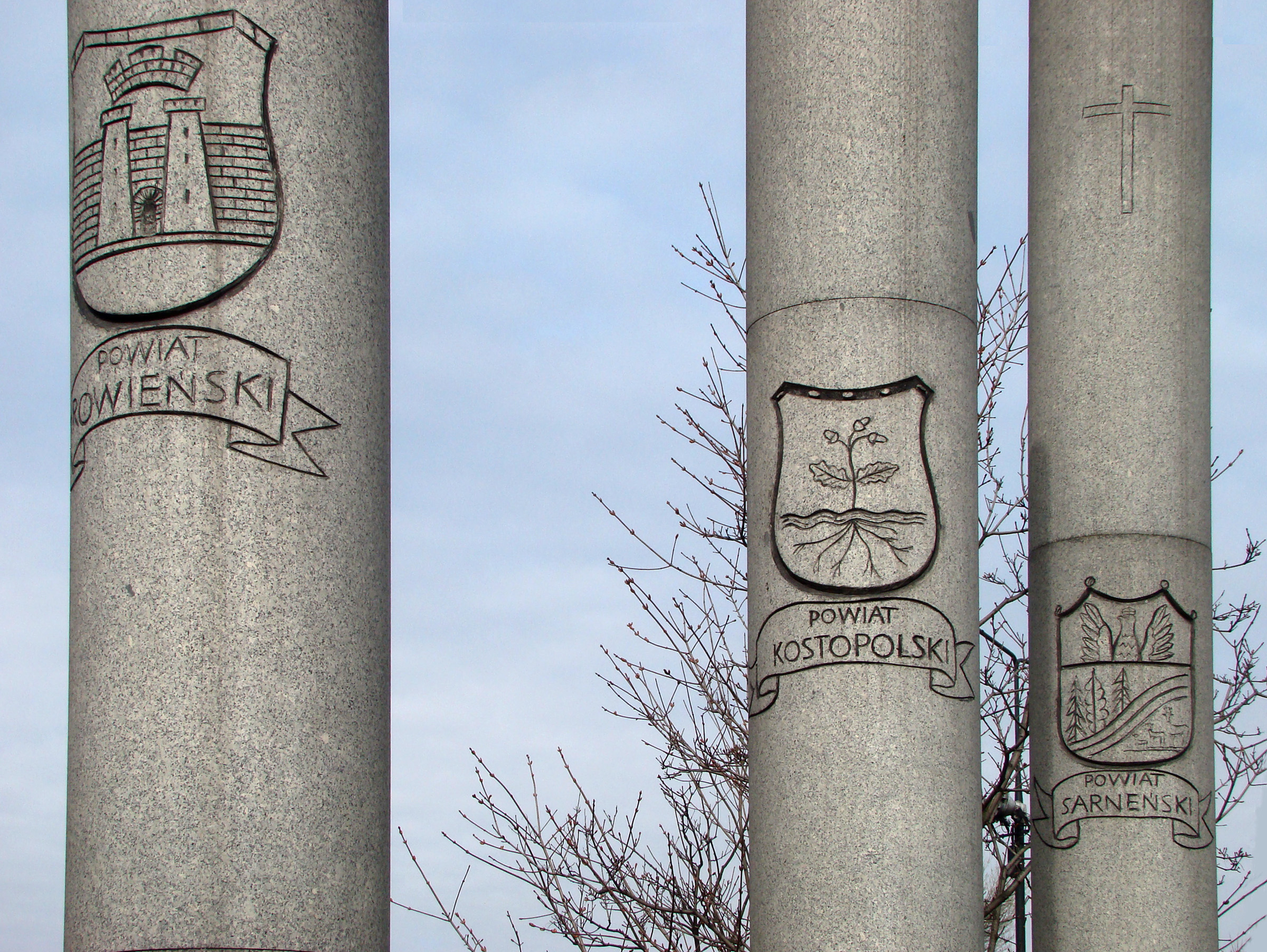
A close up of the columns

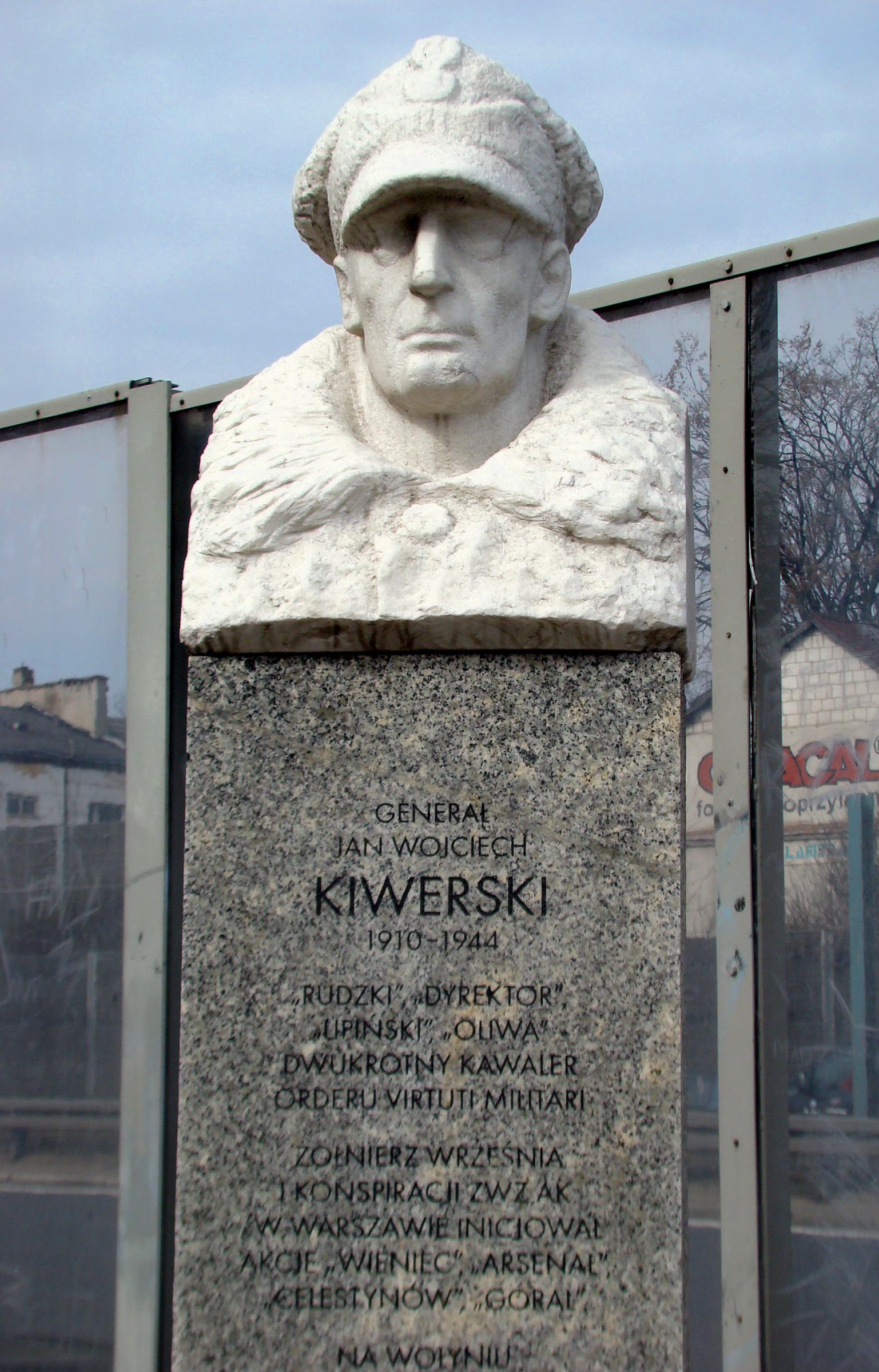
The bust of General Jan Wojciech Kiwerski

== Bibliography ==
- A view of the monument
