= Świerczewski General Staff Academy =

Military academy in the Polish People's Republic

- Akademia Sztabu Generalnego im. gen. broni Karola Świerczewskiego
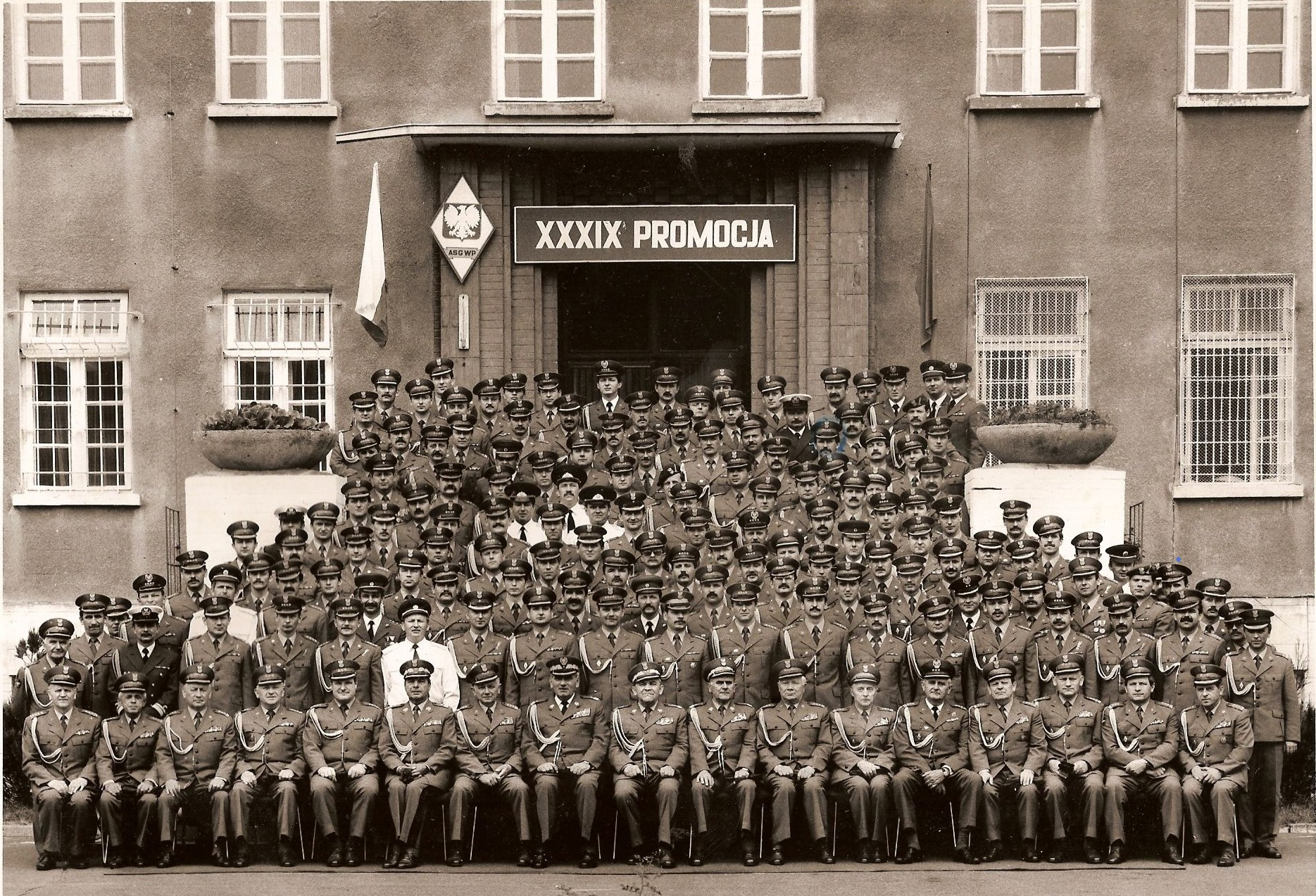
- Academy graduates on the background of the university in 1989
- Type: Military academy
- Active: 1947–1990
- Location: Rembertów, Poland

Świerczewski General Staff Academy (Polish: Akademia Sztabu Generalnego im. gen. broni Karola Świerczewskiego) was a military academy of the Polish People's Army. It was named after Karol Świerczewski. The statutory task of the academy was to develop the theory of warfare in accordance with the needs of the staffs and armies and the principles of effective defense of the state. It prepared officers with higher education for command and staff positions.

== History ==
On April 17, 1947, the Minister of National Defense, Marshal of Poland, Michał Rola-Żymierski, issued an order to establish the Preparatory Group of the General Staff Academy. Major General Zygmunt Berling became the Commander of the Preparatory Group, Colonel Mieczysław Szleyen was the Deputy Commander for Political Affairs, and Captain Włodzimierz Sęk was the Quartermaster. The group was given three rooms in a building at Aleje Niepodległości 247 in Warsaw. The group's task was to assemble a staff, primarily scientific, and to prepare a training base, including supervising the renovation of the former Free Polish University building at Opaczewska Street 2 (currently Stefana Banacha Street).

On July 7, 1947, the Minister of National Defense issued Order No. 0184/Org. on disbanding the Preparatory Group and organizing the General Staff Academy. In September 1947, the first candidates for studies were accepted.

On October 22, 1947, the Council of Ministers sanctioned the establishment of the General Staff Academy as a state academic school by decree. The school was directly subordinate to the Chief of the General Staff of the Polish People's Army.

On October 1947 the decree on its establishment was issued and on December 12, 1947, the ceremonial opening of the academy took place, combined with the inauguration of the first academic year. It was attended by, among others, the President of Poland Bolesław Bierut and the Minister of National Defense, Marshal of Poland Michał Rola-Żymierski. December 12 was celebrated as the school's holiday from then on. gen. dywizji Bolesław Zarako-Zarakowski was appointed as the first commandant.

On April 3, 1948, the Council of Ministers gave the academy the name of Lieutenant General Karol Świerczewski.

In 1948, a department structure was introduced in the academy teaching units. The following departments were established at that time: general tactics and staff service, armoured weapons, artillery, engineering and sappers, communications, rear tactics, military history and socio-political sciences. In 1950, further departments were established: air forces and history of warfare.

In 1951 the statue regulating it was approved. In the summer of 1954, the academy was moved from the building at Opaczewska (Banacha) Street 2 to the facilities of the pre-war Infantry Training Centre in Rembertów.

The fundamental influence on the creation of the academy scientific community was the decision of the Minister of National Defense of December 11 and 15, 1959, to award the title of associate professor to 11 officers with the greatest scientific and teaching achievements. They were awarded to: Brig. Gen. Mieczysław Bień, Col. Jakub Broch, Col. Józef Dac, Col. Jan Dyda, Col. Jan Kurniewicz, Col. Andrzej Madejski, Col. Edward Perkowicz, Col. Eugeniusz Petrykowski, Col. Józef Stachowski, Col. Felicjan Wiśniewski and Col. Remigiusz Wojtowicz. In the years 1961–1967, 38 academy employees obtained the degree of doctor of military science. In 1967, the first 3 habilitations were obtained – Col. Władysław Filar, Col. Kazimierz Gocyła, Col. Julian Kaczmarek.

In January 1964, Maj. Gen. Józef Kuropieska, the previous commander of the Warsaw Military District and a graduate of the pre-war Higher War School in Warsaw, was appointed to the position of academy commander. In the teaching process, General Kuropieska drew on the models in force at the Higher War School, whose long-time commander was Maj. Gen. Tadeusz Kutrzeba.

In the 1970s, the first books by academy employees in the field of military art were published, including those by Prof. Julian Kaczmarek and Kazimierz Nożka. Nationwide research programs in the field of military science were undertaken. The prestige of the university increased outside Poland, which was reflected in the fact that at the turn of the 1970s and 1980s when officers from the Soviet Union, Czechoslovakia, Hungarian People's Republic and East Germany arrived to study in the academy.

In 1983, a medal "for services to the Academy of the General Staff of the Polish Army named after General K. Świerczewski" was minted, issued by the Mint of Poland and designed by Józef Misztela.

The General Staff Academy was the longest-functioning command and staff academy in the history of Polish military education. 6,200 certified officers graduated from its walls, and over 4,800 officers completed postgraduate studies and military courses. Graduates of the academy received the certified officer title.

In accordance with resolution of the Council of Ministers of 21 May 1990, the General Staff Academy was transformed into the National Defence University of Warsaw on 1 October 1990.

== Commanders ==
- Maj. Gen. Bolesław Zarako-Zarakowski (25 July 1947 – 5 February 1948)
- Maj. Gen. Zygmunt Berling (February 5, 1948 – April 10, 1953)
- Brig. Gen. Ostap Steca (April 16, 1953 – November 11, 1953)
- Brig. Gen. Grigorij Łaźko (November 11, 1953 – December 31, 1954)
- Brig. Gen. Wiktor Sienicki (January 10, 1955 – November 25, 1956)
- Brig. Gen. prof. Dr. Mieczysław Bień (November 26, 1956 – January 1964)
- Maj. Gen. Józef Kuropieska (January 1964 – March 20, 1968)
- Maj. Gen. Adam Czaplewski (April 11, 1968 – January 12, 1973)
- Maj. Gen. Bolesław Chocha (January 24, 1973 – December 6, 1977)
- Lt. Gen. Józef Kamiński (April 1978 – December 1985)
- Maj. Gen. Prof. Dr. Władysław Mróz (December 1985 – July 14, 1990)
- Maj. Gen. Prof. Dr. Tadeusz Jemioło (July 14 – September 30, 1990)
