= Ludwik Malinowski =

Ludwik Malinowski may refer to:

- Ludwik Malinowski (resistance) (1887–1962), Polish resistance fighter
- Ludwik Malinowski (professor), succeeded Hryhoriy Yakhymovych as Rector of Lviv University
