= Kuty (Kąty) defence =

1943 skirmish between Poland and Ukraine

Kuty Defense
- Part of Polish–Ukrainian ethnic conflict
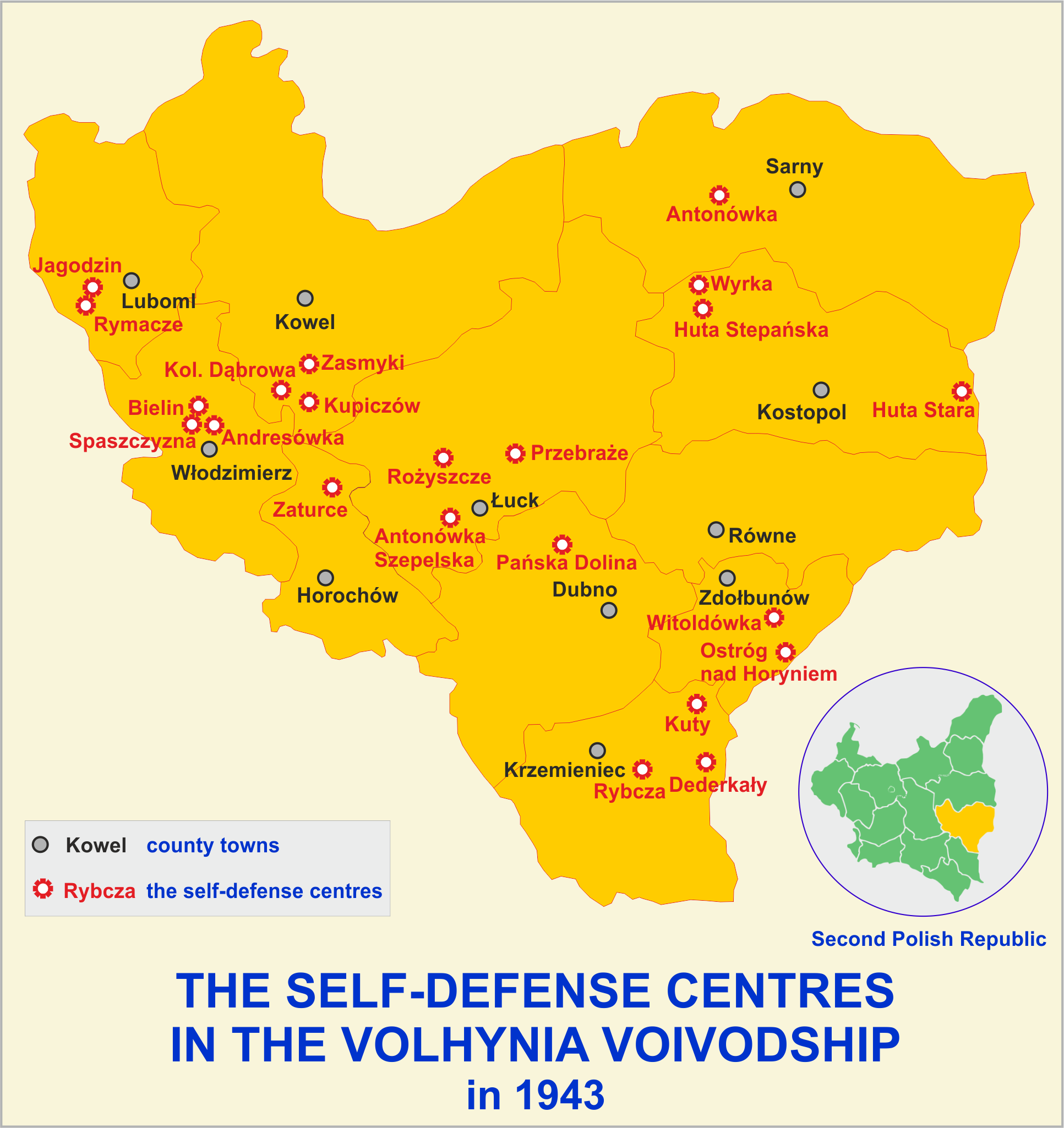
- The self-defense centres in the Volhynia Voivodship in 1943
Date	May 1943
Location	Kuty Ternopil Oblast Ukraine
Result	See Outcome

Belligerents
Polish Self–Defense; Home Army	Ukrainian Insurgent Army; OUN

Commanders and leaders
Edward Wawrzykowski; Stanisław Jasiński	Ivan Klymyshin; Mykola Nedwezhki

Strength
Unknown	More than the Poles

Casualties and losses
Unknown	Unknown
- 53 Polish civilians killed

Kuty (Kąty) defence was a skirmish between Polish self-defense units and Ukrainian Insurgent Army unit under commander Ivan Klymshyn (nom de guerre "Crow") and Andriy Melnyk's supporters in the village of Kuty (Polish Kąty) located in Volhynia, Krzemieniec (Kremenets) county, Shumsk commune 3 or 4 May 1943. In April, the Ukrainian insurgents decided to liquidate the village for the Polish population's collaboration with the Gestapo. During the fight no less than 53 Poles were killed, although the assault was repelled by self-defense forces. After the battle Poles abandoned the village, and escorted by Germans went to Shumsk and later to Kremenets.

== Prelude ==
Kuty was a Polish village with 234 Polish families (919 people) and 12 Ukrainian families. During the Soviet occupation some Poles were deported to Siberia. On November 14, 1942, Ukrainians killed a local leader, Władysław Giżycki, an organizer of the local Riflemen's Association.

After assassinations of individual Poles in late 1942, inhabitants of Kuty formed a self-defense unit. Leaders of the self-defense force included: Jan Jasiński, Feliks Jasiński, former accountant and soltys Stefczyk, Władysław Jasiński, Roman Kucharski, Edward Wawrzykowski and former soldiers - corporals Stanisław Jasiński and Stanisław Szymański. The self-defense unit gathered 25 rifles, some revolvers and hand grenades. The rest of men, in the event of an attack armed themselves with pitch-forks and scythes.

The line of defense in the center of the village included a bricked houses and a church with a tower. Since February 1943, when the Massacres of Poles in Volhynia had started, inhabitants who were afraid of attacks, began gathering in the centre of the village at night.

On May 2, the Ukrainian Insurgent Army (UIA) planned to attack the Polish village. This information leaked out to the villagers who began defence preparations, although many inhabitants did not believe that the UIA was a threat.

== Assault ==
On 3 May, at 10.20pm, the Banderites and Melnykovs attacked Kuty from the north. After being robbed, the attackers set fire to houses on the edge of the village and shelled the centre with incendiary shells. The accurate shelling of the defenders did not allow the Ukrainians to force their way through the fortifications. At around 3:30 a.m., the Ukrainians surrendered.

None of the defenders or the population who fled to the village centre were killed. However, those who disobeyed the orders of the self-defence and did not manage to hide were stabbed with knives and bayonets. In total, at least 53 people were murdered during the attack.

The attack was carried out jointly by the UPA militia under the command of Ivan Kłymyshyn "Kruk" and the OUN-M militia Mykola Nedweźki "Chron". Maksym Skorupsky "Maks", a participant in the attack, wrote after the assault: "Beginning with our action on Kuty, day after day, just after sunset, the sky was bathed in the glow of conflagration. Polish villages were burning.

== Aftermath ==
The self-defense forces decided to abandon the village due to a lack of ammunition. In the morning the Germans came from Shumsk, arrived at Kuty concerned by the glow of fire and the sound of gunfire. They gave 3 hours for everyone to pack their belongings and escorted the inhabitants to Shumsk. The next day all refugees departed to Kremenets. Most of inhabitants were deported to Germany to be used as slave labor as OST-Arbeiter. The abandoned village was razed except for the Ukrainian households. Bricked houses were disassembled. Poles who returned to Kuty after a few days were killed. The total number of Polish deaths due to the skirmish was 67 people.

== Outcome ==
Despite the fact that the Polish self-defence forces abandoned the village, they repulsed all attacks by the Ukrainians and thus saved the civilian population.
