= Malinovsky, Altai Krai =

Malinovsky Малиновский
- Settlement
- Location within Altai Krai Location within Russia
- Coordinates: 52°57′N 80°48′E
- Country: Russia
- Region: Altai Krai
- District: Zavyalovsky District
- Time zone: UTC+7:00

Malinovsky (Russian: Малиновский) is a rural locality (a settlement) and the administrative center of Malinovsky Selsoviet of Zavyalovsky District, Altai Krai, Russia. The population was 1266 as of 2016. There are 14 streets.

== Geography ==
Malinovsky is located 19 km north of Zavyalovo (the district's administrative centre) by road. Krasnodubrovsky is the nearest rural locality.

== Ethnicity ==
The village is inhabited by Russians and others.
