= Agnieszka Malinowska =

Polish mathematician

Agnieszka Barbara Malinowska is a Polish mathematician known for her research and books on fractional calculus and the fractional calculus of variations. She is an associate professor of mathematics, in the faculty of computer science of Bialystok University of Technology.

== Education and career ==
Malinowska earned a master's degree in mathematics from the University of Warsaw in 1995. She joined Bialystok University of Technology as a teaching assistant in that year. After completing her doctorate in 2003 through the Polish Academy of Sciences, she became an assistant professor at Bialystok University of Technology, and later an associate professor.

== Books ==
Malinowska is the coauthor of:

- Introduction To The Fractional Calculus Of Variations (with Delfim F. M. Torres, World Scientific, 2012)
- Quantum Variational Calculus (with Delfim F. M. Torres, Springer, 2014)
- Advanced Methods in the Fractional Calculus of Variations (with Tatiana Odzijewic and Delfim F. M. Torres, Springer, 2015)
