= Zygmunt Berling =

Polish general and politician

Zygmunt Henryk Berling
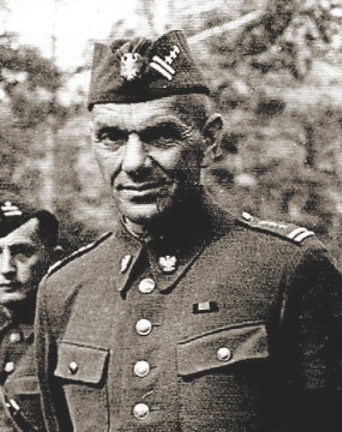
- General Zygmunt Berling (wearing the uniform of a colonel)
- Born: 27 April 1896; Limanowa, Kingdom of Galicia and Lodomeria, Austria-Hungary
- Died: 11 July 1980 (aged 84); Warsaw, Poland
- Military career
- Allegiance: Second Polish Republic; Polish People's Republic
- Branch: Polish Legions; Polish Army; Polish People's Army
- Service years: 1914–1953
- Rank: Lieutenant General
- Unit: Polish Legions
- Commands: 6th Infantry Regiment; 4th Infantry Regiment; 1st Tadeusz Kościuszko Infantry Division; First Polish Army
- Conflicts: World War I; Polish–Soviet War; Battle of Lwów; World War II; Battle of Lenino; Warsaw Uprising
- Awards: Virtuti Militari

Zygmunt Henryk Berling (27 April 1896 – 11 July 1980) was a Polish general and politician. He fought for the independence of Poland in the early 20th century. Berling was a co-founder and commander of the First Polish Army, which fought on the Eastern Front of World War II.

== Military career before World War II ==
Zygmunt Berling was born in Limanowa, then part of the Austro-Hungarian Empire, on 27 April 1896. He joined the Polish Legions of Józef Piłsudski in 1914, serving in the 2nd and 4th Legions Infantry Regiment (Pułk Piechoty Legionów). Between the "oath crisis" of June 1917 and October 1918 he served in the Austro-Hungarian Army. At the end of the World War I he joined the reborn Polish Army, becoming the commander of an infantry company in the 4th Infantry Regiment. During the Polish–Soviet War, he gained fame as an able commander during the Battle of Lwów and received the Virtuti Militari medal.

After the war, he remained in the military and in 1923 he was promoted to the rank of major, first serving on staff of the 15th Infantry Division of V District Corps Command in Kraków. In 1930, he was promoted to lieutenant colonel and started his service as a commanding officer, first in the 6th Infantry Regiment and then in the 4th Infantry Regiment. Berling retired from active duty in June 1939 because of divorce problems and conflicts with his superiors.

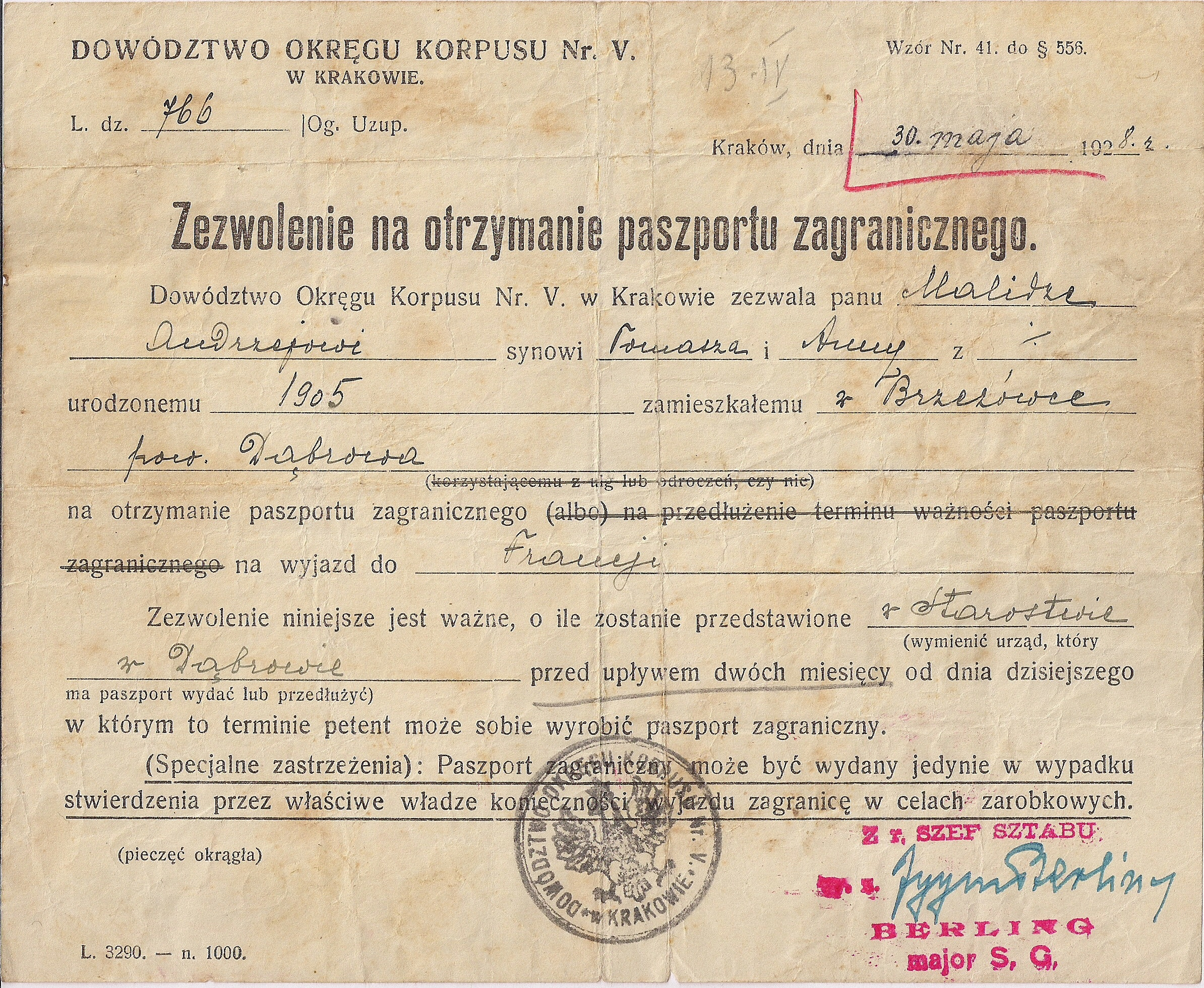
1928 army document signed by Berling when he was a major – Krakow.

== World War II ==
Berling did not participate in the Polish defence effort during the Invasion of Poland in 1939. After the city of Vilnius was occupied by the Soviet Union under the terms of the Molotov–Ribbentrop Pact, Berling, along with many other Polish officers, was arrested by the Soviet secret police (NKVD). He remained in prison until 1940, first in Starobilsk and later Moscow, eventually agreeing to cooperate with the Soviets.

After the Sikorski–Mayski agreement of 17 August 1941, Berling was nominated to be chief of staff of the recreated 5th Infantry Division, and later commander of the temporary camp for Polish soldiers in Krasnovodsk. Berling refused to leave the Soviet Union with the army led by Władysław Anders, of which Berling was formally a member. Along with two other officers, he was tried in absentia before an Anders' Army court which sentenced them to death. The sentence was vacated by General Kazimierz Sosnkowski, the Polish commander-in-chief of forces loyal to the London government in exile.

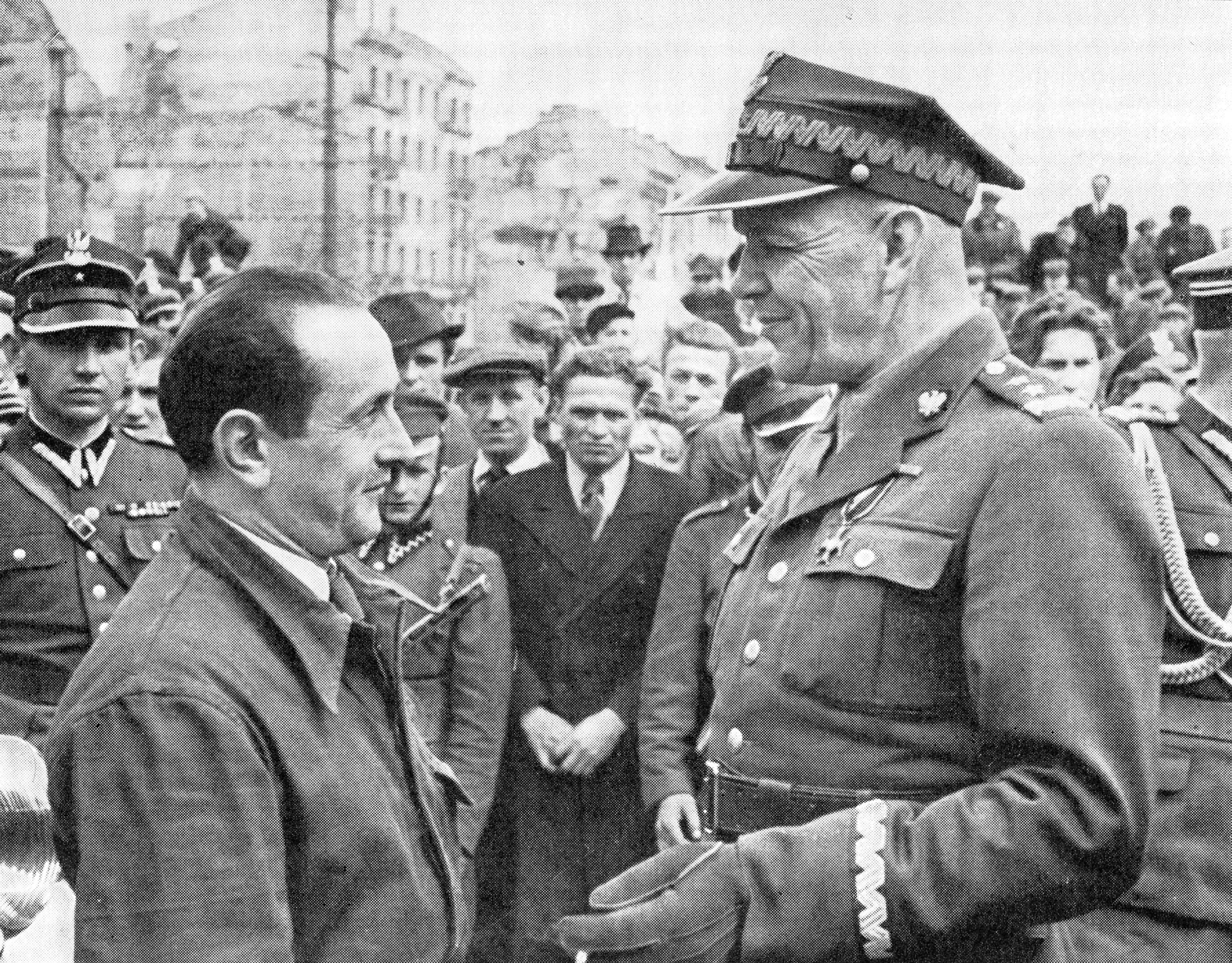
General Berling in Warsaw, 1947

From 1940, Berling had been involved in efforts to create a Polish division in the Soviet Union, at first within the Soviet Red Army. In September 1942 and during the following months, he and Wanda Wasilewska appealed to Joseph Stalin for permission to establish the Polish division. On 8 April 1943, Berling proposed the establishment of a new Polish army; permission was granted after the break in Soviet-Polish diplomatic relations.

In May 1943, the communist-led Polish People's Army was created in the Soviet Union. It was a new formation of the Polish Armed Forces in the East. Berling was nominated to be the commander of its first unit, the 1st Tadeusz Kościuszko Infantry Division, and was promoted to general by Stalin. He became the overall deputy commander of the Polish Army on the Eastern Front on 22 July 1944.

On 1 August 1944, the underground Polish Home Army, loyal to the Polish government-in-exile in London, began the 63-day long Warsaw Uprising, an attempt to free the city from the occupying German forces before the arrival of the Red Army. On 15–23 September, when the uprising was in its later phase, with his First Polish Army on the east bank of the Vistula River and the Praga district of Warsaw already secured, Berling led a rescue effort that involved crossing the Vistula and establishing a bridgehead on the west bank. The failed operation, possibly not fully consulted with Berling's Soviet military superiors, resulted in heavy Polish Army casualties and may have caused Berling's dismissal from his post soon thereafter. He was transferred to the War Academy in Moscow, where he remained until his return to Poland in 1947. In Poland, Berling organized and directed the Świerczewski General Staff Academy. He retired from the military in 1953.

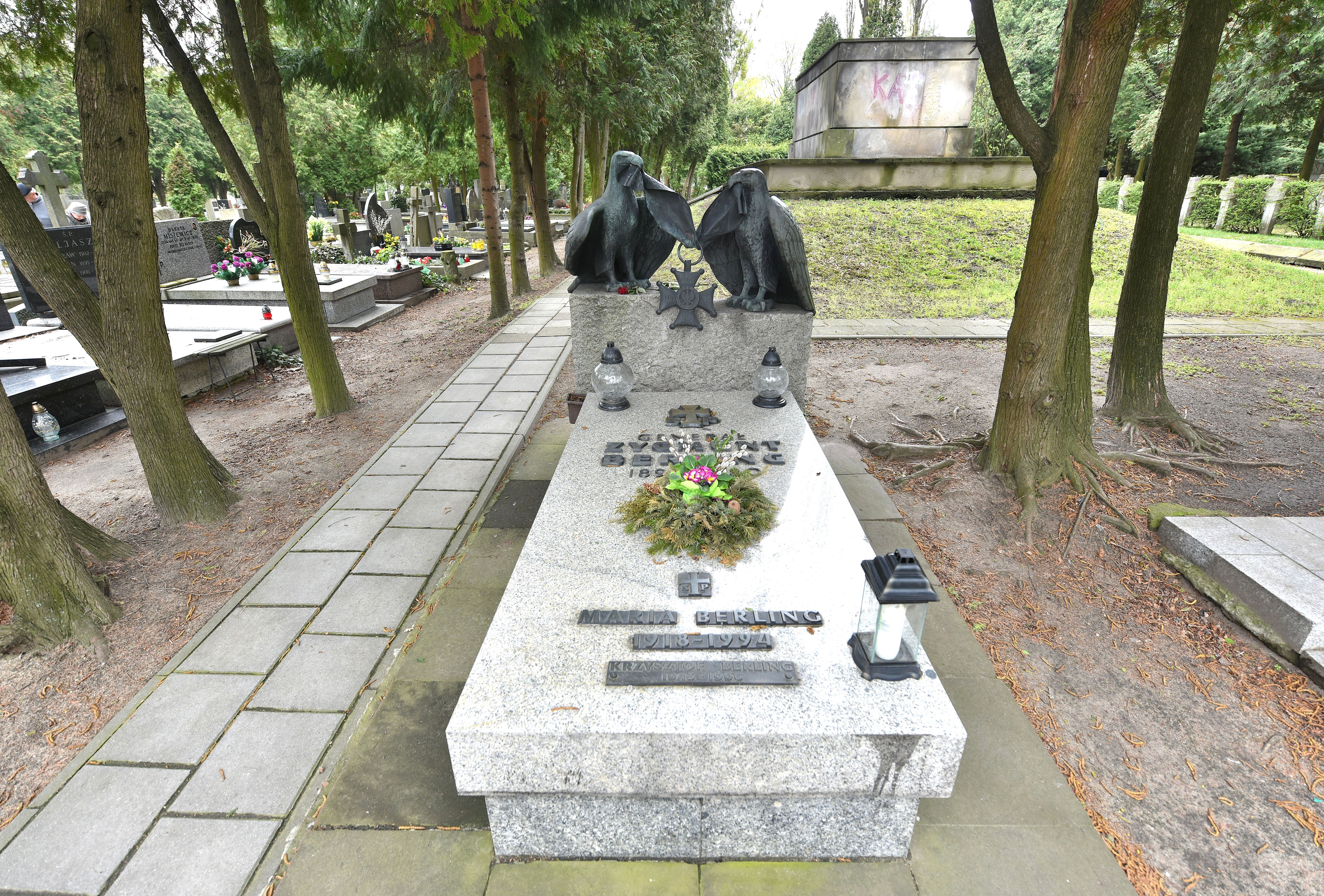
Berling gravestone at Powązki Military Cemetery

== Government career ==
Zygmunt Berling held a variety of government positions after 1953. Between 1953 and 1956, he was Undersecretary of State in the Ministry of National Agriculture Industries (Ministerstwo Państwowych Gospodarstw Rolnych), between 1956 and 1957 he was Undersecretary of State in the Ministry of Agriculture (Ministerstwo Rolnictwa) and from 1957 to 1970 he was General Inspector of Hunting (Inspektor Generalny Łowiectwa) in the Ministry of Forestry (Ministerstwo Leśnictwa). In 1963, he joined the Polish United Workers' Party.

He is buried at Powązki Military Cemetery in Warsaw.

== Promotions ==
- Chorąży (Standard-bearer) - 20 August 1915
- Podporucznik (Second lieutenant) - 1 November 1916
- Porucznik (First lieutenant) - 1918
- Kapitan (Captain) - 1920
- Major (Major) - 31 March 1924
- Podpułkownik (Lieutenant colonel) - 1932
- Pułkownik (Colonel) - 1 May 1943
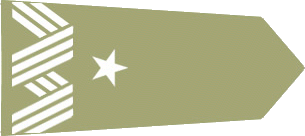
- Generał brygady (Brigadier general) - 10 August 1943
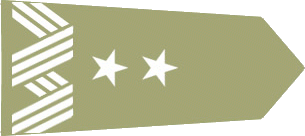
- Generał dywizji (Major general) - 22 July 1944
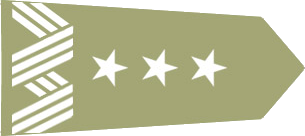
- Generał broni (Lieutenant general) - 7 October 1963

== Awards and decorations ==
- Polish People's Republic:
  - Order of the Builders of People's Poland
  - Grand Cross of the Order of Polonia Restituta
  - Commander's Cross with Star of the Order of Polonia Restituta
  - Silver Cross of the Virtuti Militari
  - Order of the Cross of Grunwald (1st class)
  - Order of the Cross of Grunwald (3rd class)
  - Order of the Banner of Labour (1st class), twice
  - Order of the Banner of Labour (2nd class)
  - Cross of Valour
  - Cross of Valour, twice
  - Gold Cross of Merit
  - Medal of Victory and Freedom 1945
  - Cross of Independence
  - Bronze Medal of Merit for National Defence
- Soviet Union:
  - Order of Lenin, twice
  - Medal "For the Victory over Germany in the Great Patriotic War 1941–1945"
  - Jubilee Medal "Twenty Years of Victory in the Great Patriotic War 1941-1945"
  - Jubilee Medal "Thirty Years of Victory in the Great Patriotic War 1941–1945"
  - Order of Friendship of Peoples

== See also ==
- Polish contribution to World War II
