= Tadeusz Czesław Malinowski =

Polish scientist and archaeologist

Tadeusz Malinowski
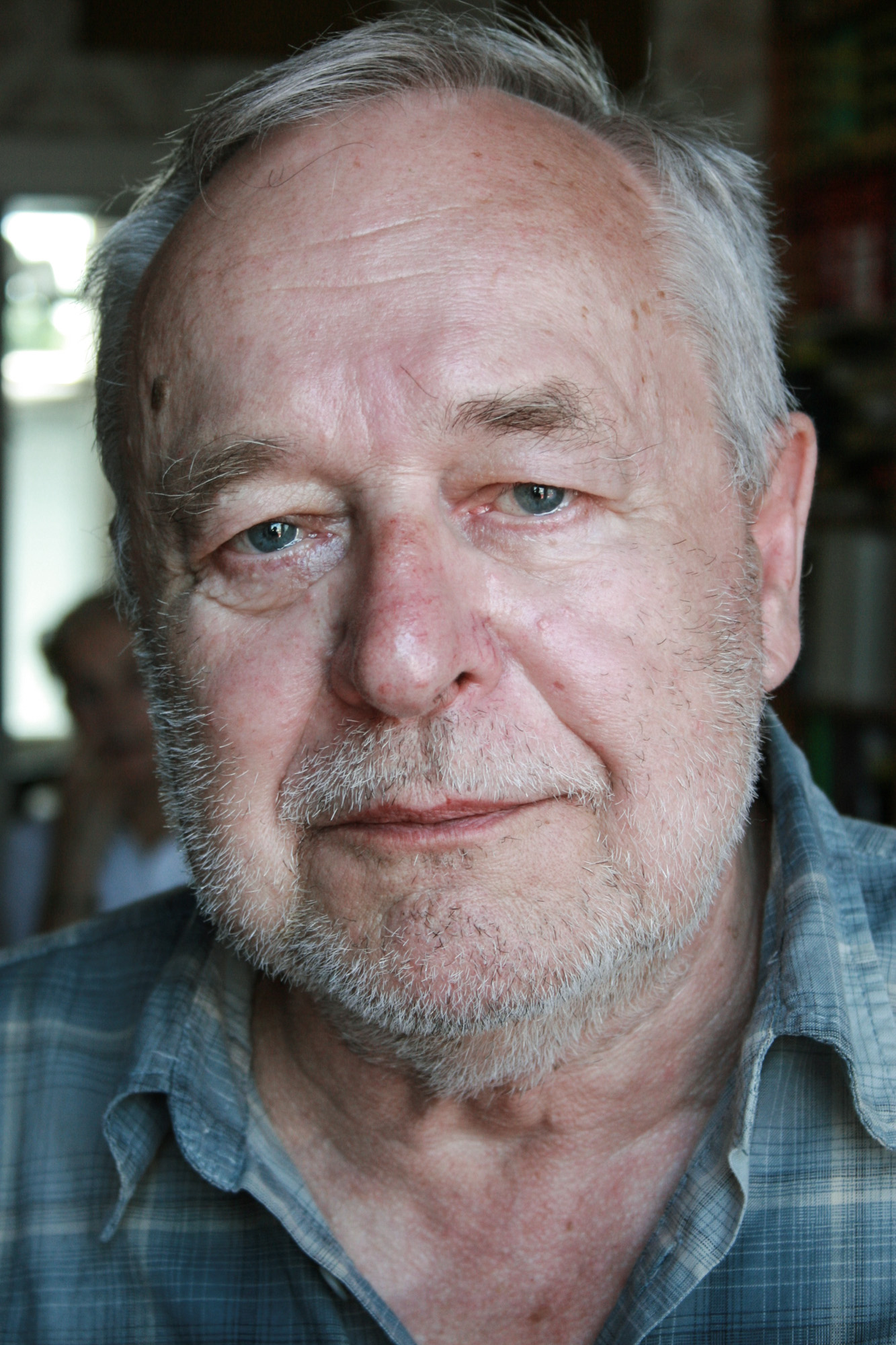
- Tadeusz Malinowski, 2009
- Born: 8 April 1932; Poznań, Poland
- Died: 20 December 2018 (aged 86)
- Education: Adam Mickiewicz University in Poznań
- Awards: Cross of Merit (Poland); Knight's Cross, Order of Polonia Restituta; Medal of the Commission of National Education
- Scientific career
- Fields: Archaeology
- Workplaces: University of Zielona Góra Akademia Pomorska in Słupsk
- Doctoral advisor: Józef Kostrzewski

Tadeusz Czesław Malinowski (8 April 1932 – 20 December 2018) was a Polish scientist and archaeologist specialising in the Bronze Age and early Iron Age.

== Early life and education ==
Born in Poznań, Poland, Malinowski was the son of Czesława Malinowska (born Brożek) and Czesław Pobóg Malinowski. His brother is Andrzej Paweł Malinowski, a Polish anthropologist.

As a child, Malinowski witnessed the Second World War. After his father escaped to the United Kingdom and his mother was arrested by the Gestapo, he lived through the Nazi occupation of Poland with his extended family in Radom and Lublin.

He studied archaeology at Adam Mickiewicz University in Poznań, where he received his doctoral title in 1960 and his habilitation in 1969. His main teachers were Józef Kostrzewski, Witold Hensel, and Eugeniusz Frankowski. By the time he received his doctorate, he had written 47 scientific publications. In 1980, he became a professor.

== Career ==
He worked in the Museum of Archaeology in Poznań from 1950 to 1975, as a professor at the Higher Pedagogical School in Słupsk until 1993, and at the University of Zielona Góra until 2002. He lectured in the Department of Archaeology at the University of Łódź from 1973 to 1974, at the Institute of Archaeology and Ethnography of the Nicolaus Copernicus University in Toruń from 1979 to 1980, and at the School of Social Skills in Poznań from 2002 to 2004.

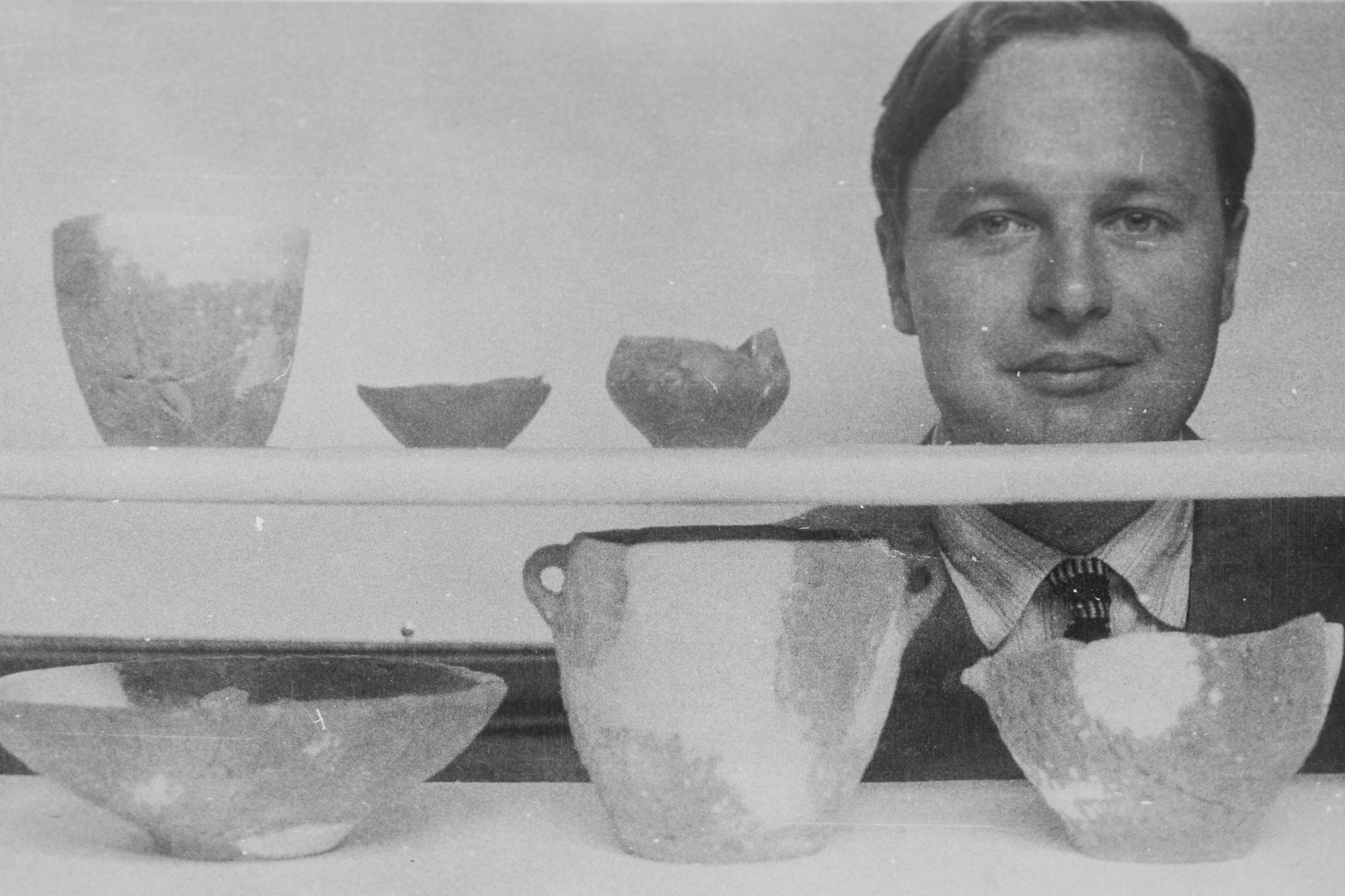
Malinowski in the Museum of Archaeology in Poznań, 1958.

Malinowski has participated in numerous archaeological excavations in Greater Poland and beyond. He was a member of a team that researched an early settlement in Saint-Jean-le-Froid, France, in the department of Aveyron. In Poland, he has studied fortified settlements from the early Iron Age in Słupca, Smuszewo, and Komorowo. He also worked on a late medieval cemetery on Rowokół hill in Smołdzino, and on an early medieval cemetery in Komorowo.

He was the author of over 380 scientific and popular publications, including more than a dozen books published in Poland and abroad. After he retired, his extensive collection of books (several thousand volumes), illustrative material (photographs and drawings), and slides were purchased by the University of Rzeszów for its Institute of Archaeology.

As a professor emeritus, Malinowski lived in Poznań, where he reviewed doctoral works and habilitations and continued his scientific research and writing.

== Scientific research ==
Malinowski's research mainly dealt with Central European funeral rites in prehistory and the early Middle Ages. He also studied the meaning of amber in prehistory and the early Middle Ages in Europe, facial representations in ceramic rituals in prehistorical Europe, and musical instruments from prehistory to modern times in Central Europe. Further, he worked on Slavic ethnogenesis issues and conducted interdisciplinary research in prehistory. Through 25 years of work at the Museum of Archaeology in Poznań, he specialised in archaeological museology.

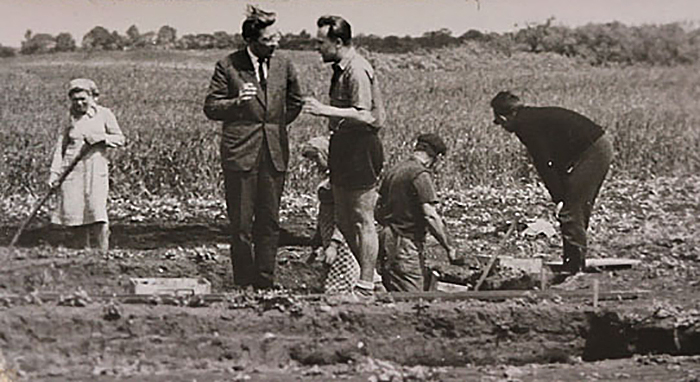
On an excavation, 1980

== Other work ==
Malinowski was vice-president of the Trade Union of Workers of Culture and Arts in Poznań from 1970 to 1973. With his brother, Andrzej, he published the book Wspomnienia z obozów: Majdanek-Oświęcim-Ravensbrück-Neu Rohlau-Zwodau (2008) on the diaries of their mother, who survived several Nazi concentration camps during World War II. He was featured in the documentary film Resettlement by Filip Antoni Malinowski in 2012.

He was married to archaeologist Maria Malinowska (born Konieczna in 1932 in Poznań). They have a daughter, Anna, and a son, Antoni.

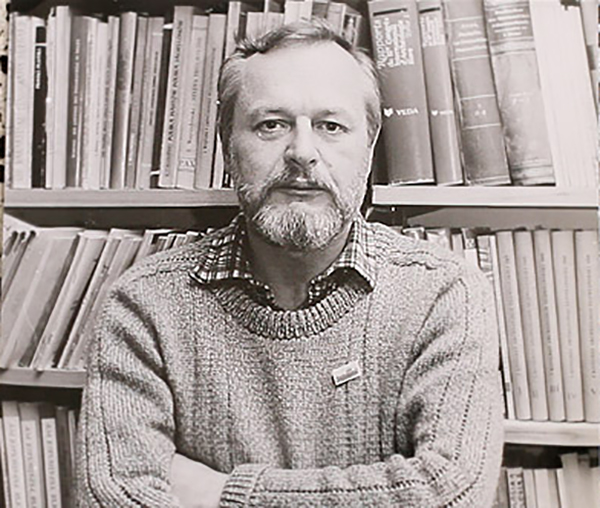
In his library in Słupsk, ca. 1990

== Honours and recognitions ==
- 1978: Cross of Merit (Poland)
- 1990: Knight's Cross, Order of Polonia Restituta
- 1998: Medal of the Commission of National Education

=== Memberships ===
- 1957: Poznań Society of Friends of Learning (Poznańskie Towarzystwo Przyjaciół Nauk)
- 1967: Current Anthropology, University of Chicago
- 1973: Poznań Committee of Sciences, Department of Archaeology (Komitet Archeologii Oddział PAN w Poznaniu)
- 1983: Study Group on Music Archaeology, Hanover, Germany
- 1990: Committee on Science, Work, and Protohistory (Komitet Nauk Pra- i Protohistorycznych PAN)
- 1993: Committee for Archaeology in Wrocław (Komitet Archeologii Oddział PAN in Wrocław)
- 1999: Lubusz Scientific Society (Lubuskie Towarzystwo Naukowe)

== Selected publications ==
=== Books ===
- Katalog cmentarzysk ludności kultury łużyckiej w Polsce, Vol. 1–2, Warsaw, Instytut Historii Kultury Materialnej PAN (1961)
- Obrządek pogrzebowy ludności kultury pomorskiej, Wrocław/Warsaw/Kraków, Ossolineum (1969)
- Katalog cmentarzysk ludności kultury pomorskiej, Vol. 1–3, Pedagogical School of Słupsk (1979–1981)
- Wielkopolska w otchłani wieków, Poznań, Wydawnictwo Poznańskie (1985)
- Laski. Materiały z cmentarzyska kultury łużyckiej, Part 1–4, Pedagogical School of Słupsk (1988–1991)
- Komorowo, stanowisko 1: grodzisko kultury łużyckiej – faktoria na szlaku bursztynowym, University of Rzeszów, (2006)

=== Scientific publications ===
- "Grodziska kultury łużyckiej w Wielkopolsce", Fontes Archaeologici Posnanienses, Vol. 5, 1955
- "Obrządek pogrzebowy ludności kultury łużyckiej w Polsce", Przegląd Archeologiczny, Vol. 14, 1962
- "Problem pogranicza prasłowiańsko-prailiryjskiego", Slavia Antiqua, Vol. 21, 1975
- "Les hochets en argile dans la civilisation lusacienne de Pologne (age du bronze – age du fer)", in: "La pluridisciplinarite en archeologie musicale", Vol. 1, Paris, 1994
- "Niektóre zagadnienia rozwoju kulturowego u schyłku epoki brązu i we wczesnej epoce żelaza w Europie Środkowej", in: "Kultura pomorska i kultura grobów kloszowych", Warsaw, 1995
- "Łaba – Odra – Wisła: oddziaływania kulturowe u schyłku epoki brązu i we wczesnej epoce żelaza", in: "Rola Odry i Łaby w przemianach kulturowych epoki brązu i epoki żelaza", Wrocław-Gliwice, 1997

== Bibliography ==
- Księga jubileuszowa: Miscellanea archaeologica Thaddaeo Malinowski dedicata, edited by Franciszek Rożnowski, Słupsk/Poznań, 1993, Pedagogical School of Słupsk
- Opuscula archaeologica – Opera dedicata in Professorem Thaddeum Malinowski, edited by Wojciech Dzieduszycki, University of Zielona Góra, 2007
- Enzyklopädisches Handbuch zur Ur- und Frühgeschichte Europas, edited by Jan Filip, Vol. 2, Prag, 1969; Vol. 3, Praha, 1998
- Fifth International Directory of Anthropologists, Chicago/London, 1975
- Współcześni Uczeni Polscy, Słownik Biograficzny, Vol. III, M-R, edited by Janusz Kapuścik, Warsaw, 2006, Ośrodek Przetwarzania Informacji
