= Władysław Filar =

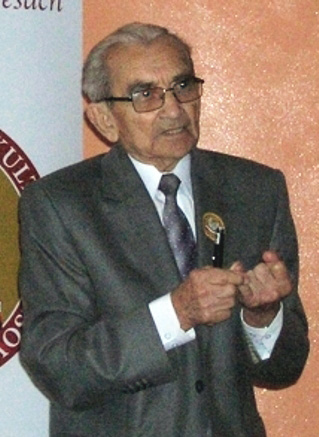
Władysław Filar

Władysław Filar (18 July 1926 – 13 August 2019) was a Polish historian, academic and a soldier of the 27th Home Army Infantry Division.

Filar was born in Iwanicze Nowe in Volhynia, Poland (now Ukraine). During the Second World War, he fought against the Germans in Volhynia in Operation Tempest, and defended Polish villages against the Ukrainian Insurgent Army. In 1956, he completed the Świerczewski General Staff Academy and in 1963 received a doctorate in Military History. He habilitated in 1970 and became associate professor in 1973. He authored up to 120 historical and military publications. Filar also organized a series of historical seminars: "Poland – Ukraine: difficult questions" (1996–2001).

Filar latterly served as the vice-chairman of Volhynia County, World Union of Home Army. He died in Warsaw on 13 August 2019, at the age of 93.

== Awards and decorations ==
- Cross of Valour
- Partisan Cross
- Polish Army Medal, three times
- Home Army Cross

== Books ==
- Przed Akcją Wisła był Wołyń, książka pod redakcją Władysława Filara, Wydawnictwo: Światowy Związek Żołnierzy Armii Krajowej, 1997. ISBN 83-901947-4-0
- Wołyń 1939-1944. Eksterminacja, czy walki polsko-ukraińskie, Wydawnictwo Adam Marszałek, 2003. ISBN 83-7322-621-4
- Przebraże bastion polskiej samoobrony na Wołyniu, Rytm Oficyna Wydawnicza, 2007. ISBN 978-83-7399-254-2
- Wydarzenia wołyńskie 1939-1944. W poszukiwaniu odpowiedzi na trudne pytania, Wydawnictwo Adam Marszałek, 2008. ISBN 978-83-7441-884-3
- "Burza" na Wołyniu". Z dziejów 27 Wołyńskiej Dywizji Piechoty Armii Krajowej. Studium historyczno-wojskowe, Oficyna Wydawnicza RYTM i ROPWiM, Warszawa 1997. ISBN 83-86678-73-9

== Sources ==
- Publishing house Adam Marszałek, (In Polish)
