= Franciszek Malinowski (activist) =

Polish activist, communist and politician

- Born: Franciszek Malinowski; 8 or 10 October 1897; Rogów, Sokołów County, Vistula Land
- Died: 27 or 28 February 1944 (aged 46); Weimar, Thuringia, Nazi Germany
- Occupation(s): Activist, communist, politician

Franciszek Malinowski (8 or 10 October 1897 – 27 or 28 February 1944) was a Polish activist, communist and politician.

== Death ==
Franciszek Malinowski was executed on either 27 or 28 February 1944, aged 46, at the Buchenwald concentration camp in Weimar, Thuringia, Nazi Germany.
