= 27th Volhynian Infantry Division =

Polish partisan unit active during World War II

27th Home Army Infantry Division
- 27 Wołyńska Dywizja Piechoty
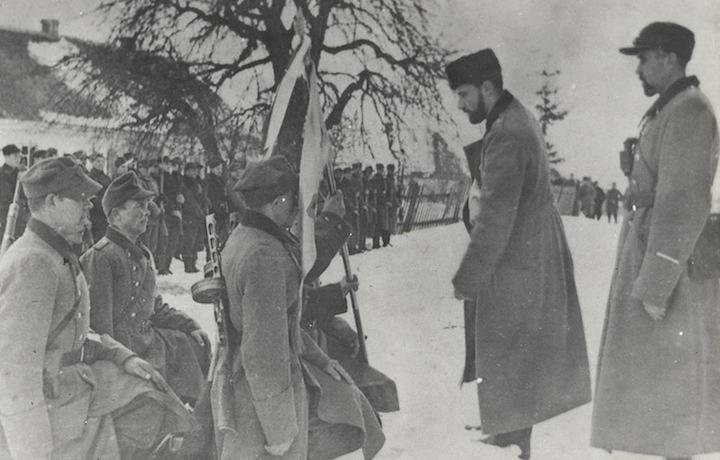
- An official oath of the division's soldiers, winter 1944
- Leader: Kazimierz Bąbiński "Luboń"
- Dates active: 15 January – 25 July 1944
- Active regions: Volhynia
- Size: 7,300 (March 1944)
- Part of: Armia Krajowa
- Wars: World War II

27th Volhynian Infantry Division (Polish: 27 Wołyńska Dywizja Piechoty) was a World War II Polish Home Army formed in the Volhynia region in 1944. It was created on January 15, 1944, from smaller partisan self-defence units during the Volhynia massacre and was patterned after the prewar Polish 27th Infantry Division.

== History ==
The 27th Volhynian Infantry Division of the Home Army (AK) was the first large Polish military unit to openly engage in combat with the Germans as part of Operation Tempest. Volhynia, even before the war, was a region with the smallest percentage of Polish population, further decimated by Soviet deportations, German terror, and the ethnic cleansing carried out by Ukrainian nationalists since 1943. Considering the dire situation, the local AK command, led primarily by commander Colonel Kazimierz Bąbiński "Luboń" and chief of staff Captain Tadeusz Klimowski "Ostoja", decided to concentrate all forces in one region, east of the Bug River, and form a single large corps.

Bąbiński issued the mobilization order on January 15, 1944, and headed to Kupychiv, where his headquarters was to be located. Most local Polish units refused to comply with the order, not wanting to leave the Polish population without any defense against the still marauding UPA units. Consequently, the division-strength unit was formed mainly from the Kowel and Łuck inspectorates. And numbered about 6,500 people in January 1944. After mobilization in March 1944, the division became one of the largest partisan units in Central Europe with 7,300 soldiers, officers and NCOs.

The division initially aided local self-defence units during the massacres of Poles in Volhynia and fought against the Ukrainian Insurgent Army. It also fought German anti-partisan units and regular Wehrmacht troops. The unit commander, Colonel Babiński strictly prohibited any repressions against women and children. Despite this and despite the orders by the Polish government not to harm civilians, some Polish partisans retaliated against the massacre of Poles by burning down Ukrainian villages and killing ethnic Ukrainians whom they encountered on Volhynian roads.

In 1944 the division fought several major battles near Włodzimierz Wołyński (February 23), Hołoby (March 9) and Zasmyki (March 17). During the latter two battles the division cooperated with local Soviet partisan groups and the advancing Red Army. After reaching the frontline and contacting the Soviets, Colonel Jan Kiwerski "Oliwa" was asked to combine the unit with the Red Army as a regular unit of the Soviet-backed Polish army. He declined and returned to partisan fighting. The division was surrounded by the Germans near Kowel on April 2.

After receiving a promise of Soviet help, the unit fought surrounded for two weeks. When no help arrived, the unit started to break through in the direction of Włodawa. As a result of heavy fighting, it lost between 10% and 50% of its personnel.

The division returned northwards and was surrounded by the end of May. Elements of the division broke through the Pripyat river and reached the Soviet lines. The officers were arrested by the NKVD and sent to Russia while most of the soldiers were conscripted into the First Polish Army of General Zygmunt Berling.

The division's remnants withdrew westwards, crossed the Bug river on June 7 to the Parczew Forest near Lublin. It joined other Home Army units and took part in the liberation of Kock, Lubartów, and the village Firlej on July 21.

After the Red Army reached the area they took over the captured territory. Most of the divisions officers, NCOs and ordinary soldiers were arrested by the NKVD and were interred in gulags. Only a small part joined the Red Army or the Soviet-controlled Polish People's Army.

== Commanders ==
- Colonel Kazimierz Damian Bąbiński "Luboń" - January 15 - February 11
- Lieutenant Colonel Jan Wojciech Kiwerski "Oliwa" - February 11 - April 18
- Major Jan Szatowski "Kowal" - April 18 - May 3
- Major Tadeusz Sztumberk-Rychter "Żegota" - May 3 - July 16
- Colonel Jan Kotowicz "Twardy" - July 16 - July 25

== See also ==
- Operation Tempest
- Defense of Przebraże
- Monument to the Volhynia 27th Home Army Infantry Division

== Bibliography ==
- Sowa, Andrzej Leon (2016). Kto wydał wyrok na miasto? Plany operacyjne ZWZ-AK (1940-1944) i sposoby ich realizacji [Who passed the sentence on the city? Operational plans of the ZWZ-AK (1940-1944) and methods of their implementation] (in Polish). Warsaw: Wydawnistwo Literackie. ISBN 978-83-08-05835-0.
