= Partisan Cross =

Partisan Cross Krzyż Partyzancki
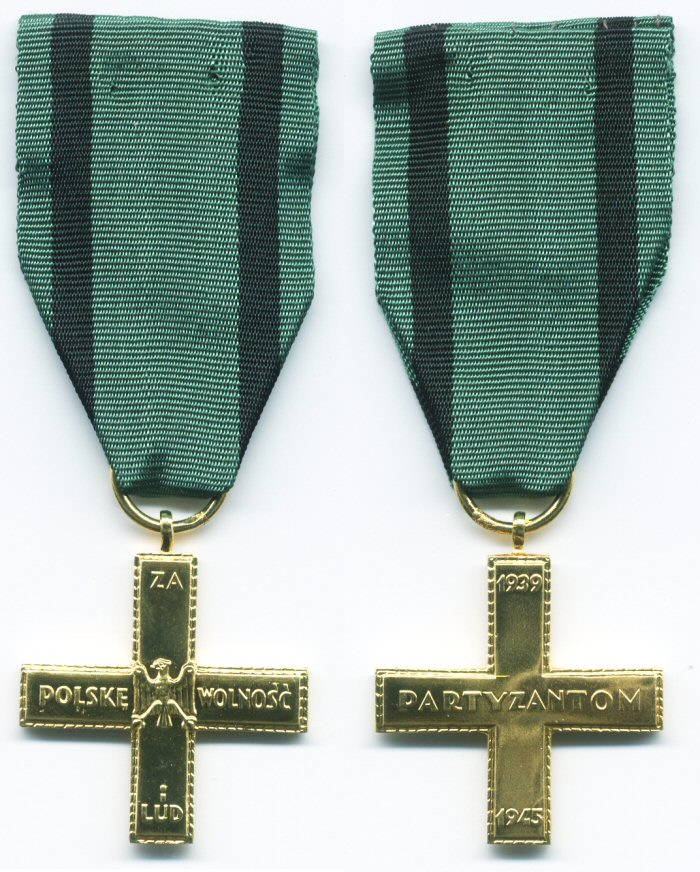
- Krzyż Partyzancki
- Description: (see text)
- Country: Poland
- Eligibility: organizers, commanders and members of partisan units
- Motto: ZA – POLSKĘ – WOLNOŚĆ – i LUD
- Established: October 26, 1945
- First award: 1952
- Final award: 1999

Highlights
- Total: c. 55,000

Precedence
- Next (higher): Cross of Valour (Poland)

The Partisan Cross (Polish: Krzyż Partyzancki) was a Polish military decoration awarded to World War II partisans (part of resistance movement fighting in the countryside). It was introduced by the Council of Ministers on October 26, 1945. It was awarded from 1945 until 1999.

It was awarded to organizers, commanders and members of partisan units who fought against Germans on a Polish territory, or to Poles who fought in partisan units in the USSR, Yugoslavia and France, or to foreigners, who fought in partisan units on a Polish territory. It could be given also to cities or villages, that distinguished themselves in supporting the partisan movement.

It was awarded first by the Ministry of Defence, from 1952 by the Council of State, from 1989 by the President of Poland. It ceased to be awarded in 1999. About 55,000 Partisan Crosses were awarded.

== Description ==
The Cross is a gold-plated Greek cross with thin arms, 38 x 38 mm. Obverse shows the eagle in the centre (the Polish coat-of-arms) and an inscription: "ZA – POLSKĘ – WOLNOŚĆ – i LUD" (For Poland, Liberty and People) on arms. The reverse bears the horizontal inscription "PARTYZANTOM" (to partisans), and the date "1939" on an upper vertical arm and "1945" on a lower arm. A ribbon is dark green, 35 mm wide, with black strips 7 mm wide, near both edges.

In an order of precedency, the Partisan Cross was worn after Cross of Valour.

== Number awarded ==
According to the data of the State Decorations Bureau of the State Council Chancellery and the Decorations Bureau of the Chancellery of the President of the Republic of Poland, 75,374 crosses were awarded until 1987, and then additionally 18,651 crosses; in total - 94,025 crosses.

== See also ==
- Polish partisans
- Recipients of the Partisan Cross
