= First UPA attack on Mizocz =

- Part of Polish-Ukrainian ethnic conflict during Massacres of Poles in Volhynia and Eastern Galicia
Date	August 24/25 or August 31/September 1, 1943
Location	Mizocz
Result	Axis victory: Beginning of the attacks on the Mizocz; 80% destruction of Mizocz
Territorial changes	Withdrawal of UPA forces

Belligerents
Germany; Hungary: Polish Auxiliary Police	Ukrainian Insurgent Army

Commanders and leaders
Unknown or lack of a unified commander	Petro Olijnyk

Strength
Incomplete company of the Hungarian army, Schutzmannschaft (about 40 policemen), armed Poles	Sotnias dubienskiy and krzemienieckiy kurienskiy

Casualties and losses
Unknown	27 killed or wounded
- 100 Polish civilians killed

The first UPA attack on Mizocz - an attack by Ukrainian Insurgent Army units on the town of Mizocz, located in the Zdolbunov district of Volhynia province, and battles with a Hungarian army unit and police, combined with the murder of more than 100 Poles and the burning of most of the village buildings. The attack took place on the night of 24 to 25 August or 31 August to 1 September 1943, during the German occupation. The consequence of the attack was the evacuation of the surviving Polish civilians to Zdolbunov.

== Before attack ==
From the beginning of the German occupation, the Ukrainians of Mizocz began to show hostility towards the Poles, but according to Władysław and Ewa Siemaszek, the presence of a company of Germans on the site prevented them from making more anti-Polish appearances until the summer of 1943. There were murders of individuals and, in July 1943, the murder of 15 people grazing cattle. During the Massacres of Poles in Volhynia and Eastern Galicia, Polish refugees from villages exterminated by the Ukrainian Insurgent Army (UPA) were drawn to the town; burials of brought bodies took place in the cemetery every day. Some of the new arrivals, seeing no possibility of survival, volunteered for forced labour in the Third Reich or left for larger centres. Among the refugees, the Germans recruited 40 men for the police. From 1943, a Hungarian company was also stationed in the town and helped the Poles by feeding them and giving them weapons.

In the summer of 1943, a company of Germans left Mizocz and the Hungarian garrison was also reduced. The Hungarians and the police were stationed in the buildings of Count Dunin-Karwicki's palace and the sugar factory, which were located in the western part of the town.

In August 1943, the Miso people lived in anticipation of an attack by the Ukrainian Insurgent Army; just before the attack, the Ukrainians moved out of the town. Stanisława Kowalska was warned of the attack by the Ukrainian Dawidiuk.

== Attack ==
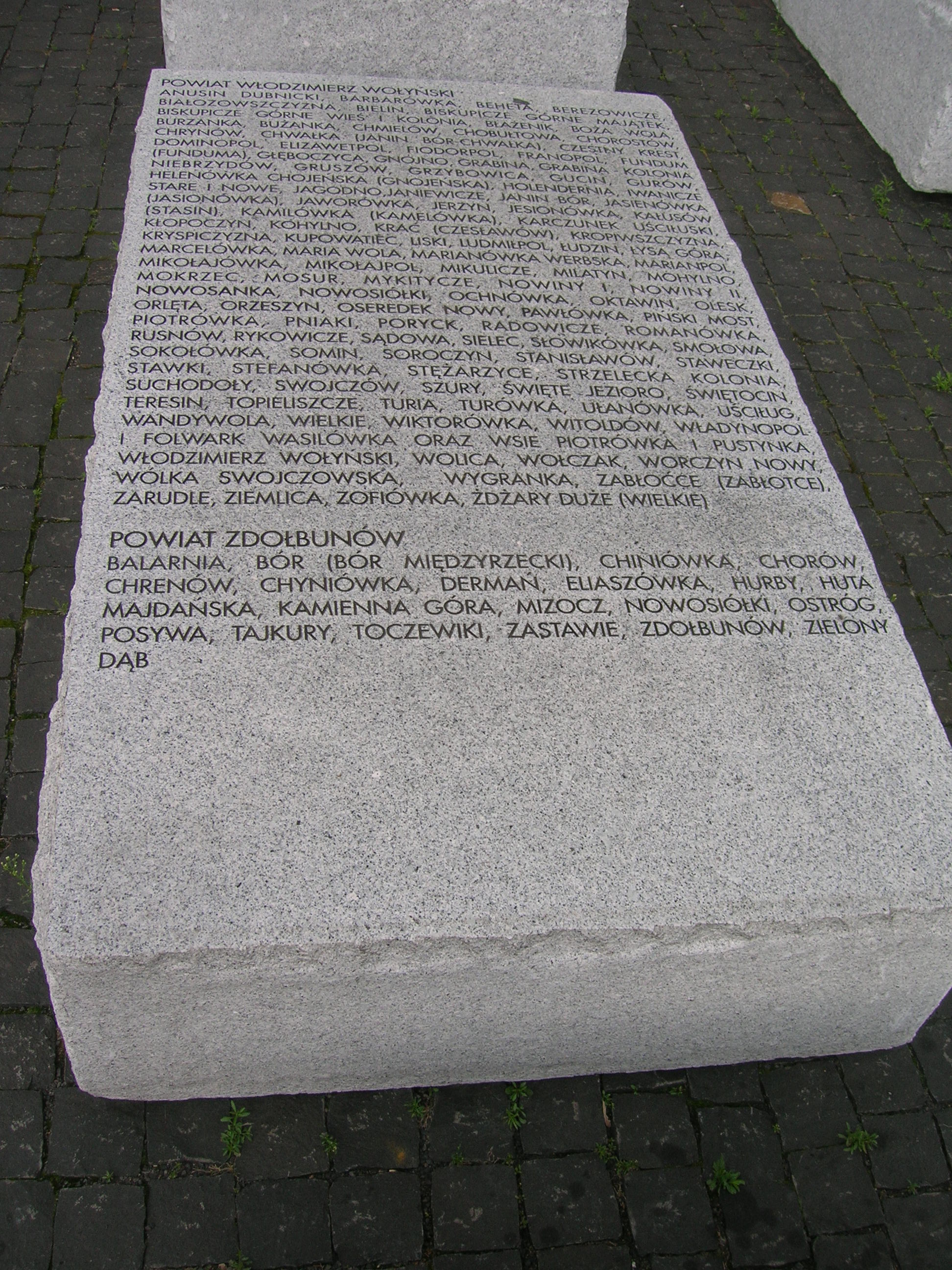
Plaque at the Monument to the Victims of the Crimes Committed against Polish Citizens by the OUN-UPA mentioning Mizocz

At the end of August 1943 (on the night of 24–25 August or 31 August/1 September), shortly after midnight, two Ukrainian Insurgent Army's kurenas (Dubiensk and Krzemieniec) attacked Mizocz from the east and started exterminating Poles and burning buildings. They were murdered mainly with white weapons (sickles, axes, knives). The fight against the attackers was undertaken by Polish policemen and armed civilians, as well as a Hungarian company. The fighting and slaughter of the population lasted all night. The number of casualties W. and E. Siemaszek estimate at over 100, although higher estimates also exist. The victims were mostly refugees from the villages. According to the Siemaszko family, the underground AK platoon that existed in Mizocz played no role in the defence of the Poles.

Maksym Skorupski's "Maks" sotnia captured the sugar factory, but did not manage to take the sugar, as it was ordered to retreat due to the appearance of German forces in the area. According to the Siemaszko family, the reason for the aborted attack may have been the Hungarian relief from Zdolbunov, which arrived in Mizocz in the morning.

== Subsequent events ==
On the second day, the Poles collected the dead from the streets, buried them in a mass grave and almost all of them left the 80% burned town evacuating by rail to Zdolbunov. Along the way, the refugees were constantly fired upon by the Ukrainians, to which the armed Poles responded with fire. Those who remained, in time, left on their own. The Czechs, who had not yet been attacked by the UPA, also left the village.

The second UPA attack on Mizoch occurred on 3 November 1943.
