= Mizoch Ghetto =

World War II ghetto in occupied Ukraine

Coordinates: 50°24′N 26°09′E

- Mizoch Ghetto location during the Holocaust, with the Nazi administrative districts

- Mizocz Ghetto in Modern Ukraine Mizocz Ghetto in Modern Rivne Oblast, Ukraine
- Location: Near Rivne in western Ukraine, Reichskommissariat Ukraine
- Date: March 1942 - 14 October 1942
- Incident type: Imprisonment, forced labor, mass shootings
- Perpetrators: Einsatzgruppen, Order Police battalions, Ukrainian Auxiliary Police
- Ghetto: 1,700 population
- Victims: about 200 (at the fire) about 2,000 to 3,500 (at mass shootings) (Note: Some testimonies stated over 2,000 deads in the mass killings, while others reported 1,500 jews were executed the first day (14 October), 800 the second day, with a total of 3,500 by the end of January 1943.)

The Mizoch (Mizocz) Ghetto (German: Misotsch; Cyrillic: Мизоч; Yiddish: מיזאָטש) was a World War II ghetto set up in the town of Mizoch, then Eastern Poland, today Western Ukraine, by Nazi Germany for the forcible segregation and mistreatment of Jews. In October 1942, Ukrainian Auxiliary Police and German policemen enclosed the ghetto; an uprising erupted, and the remaining inhabitants were mass murdered. Their execution was photographed by the SS.

== Background ==
Jews settled in Mizoch in the 18th century. In 1897, the total population of the town was 2,662 with 1,175 Jews owning factories for felt, oil and sugar production, as well as the flour mill and sawmills. Some Jews emigrated during World War I. According to the national census of 1921 in the Second Polish Republic there were 845 Jews in Mizocz, most of them identifying with Turzysk Hasidism. Their numbers grew as the Polish economy improved. It was an urban community between world wars like many others in Kresy (eastern Poland), inhabited by Jews and Poles along with members of other minorities including Ukrainians. There was a military school in Mizocz for officer cadets of Battalion 11 of the Polish Army's First Brigade; the Karwicki Palace (built in 1790), Hotel Barmocha Fuksa, a Catholic and an Orthodox church, and a Synagogue. The nearest major city was Równo.

Mizoch is situated some 29 kilometres (18 mi) east of Dubno. Before the German-Soviet invasion of Poland in 1939, the town, Mizocz, was located in the Wołyń Voivodeship in the Second Polish Republic. Annexed by the USSR following the 1939 Soviet invasion of eastern Poland, Mizocz was occupied by the Wehrmacht in Operation Barbarossa, the June 1941 invasion of the Soviet Union. Some 300 Jews escaped with the retreating Soviets.

== Uprising and mass killings ==
On 12 October 1942 the closed-off ghetto of about 1,700 Jews was surrounded by Ukrainian Auxiliary Police and German policemen in preparation for the ghetto liquidation action. The Jews fought back in an uprising which may have lasted as long as two days. About half the residents were able to flee or hide during the confusion before the uprising was put down. On October 14, the inmates of the ghetto set many of the houses on fire; as a result, while many succeeded in escaping, about 200 people died in the flames inside the ghetto. On 14 and 15 October the captured survivors were transported in lorries to a secluded ravine and shot.

=== Photographs ===
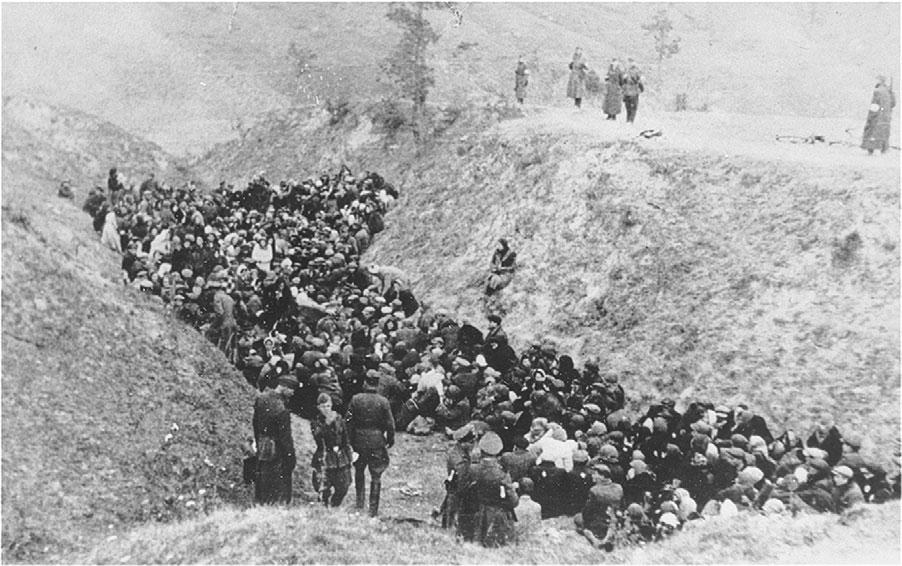
Jews from the Mizocz Ghetto rounded up with the assistance of the Gendarmerie and Ukrainian Schutzmannschaften for execution.14 October 1942

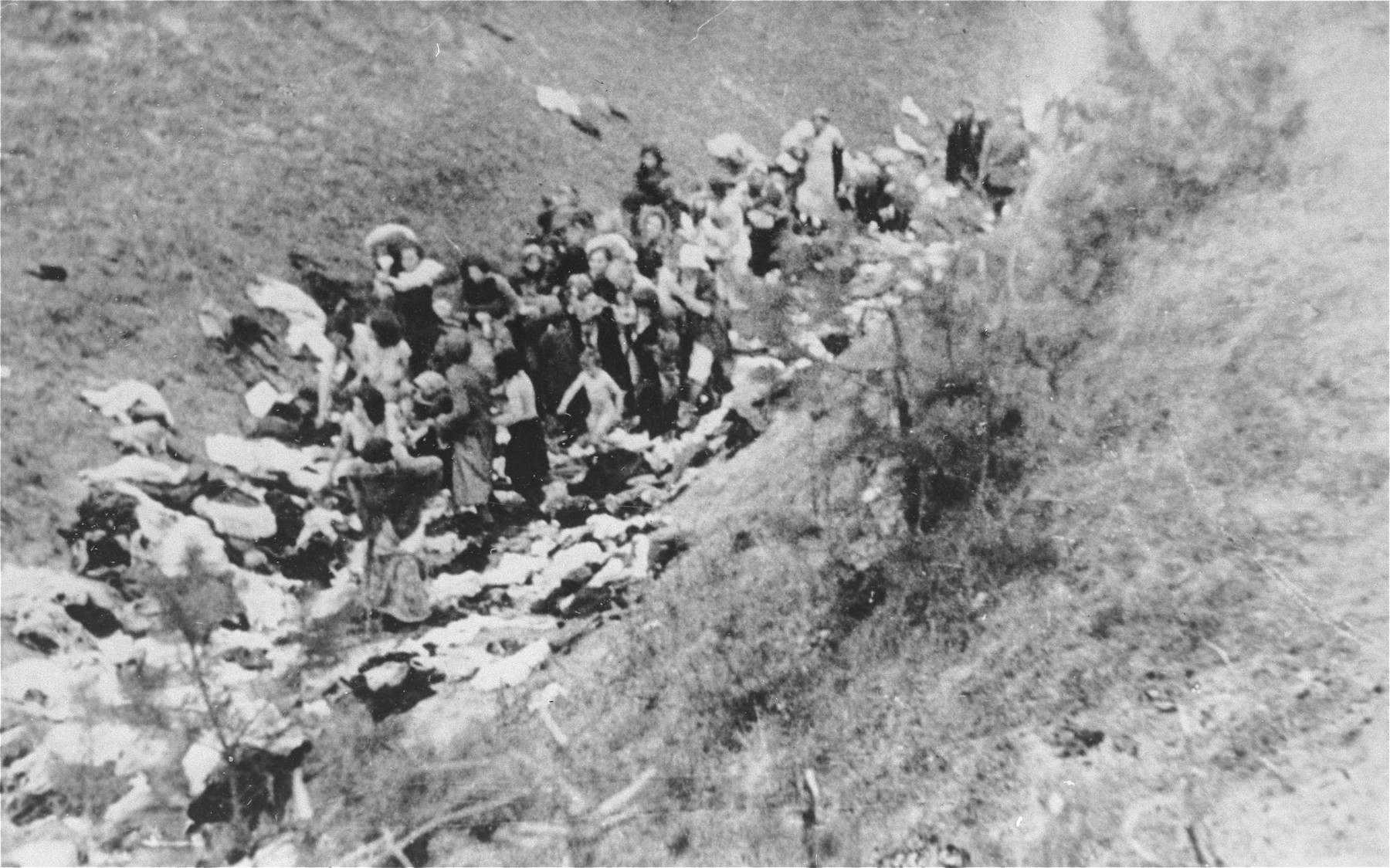
Jewish women and children are ordered to undress prior to their execution outside the Mizocz Ghetto.14 October 1942

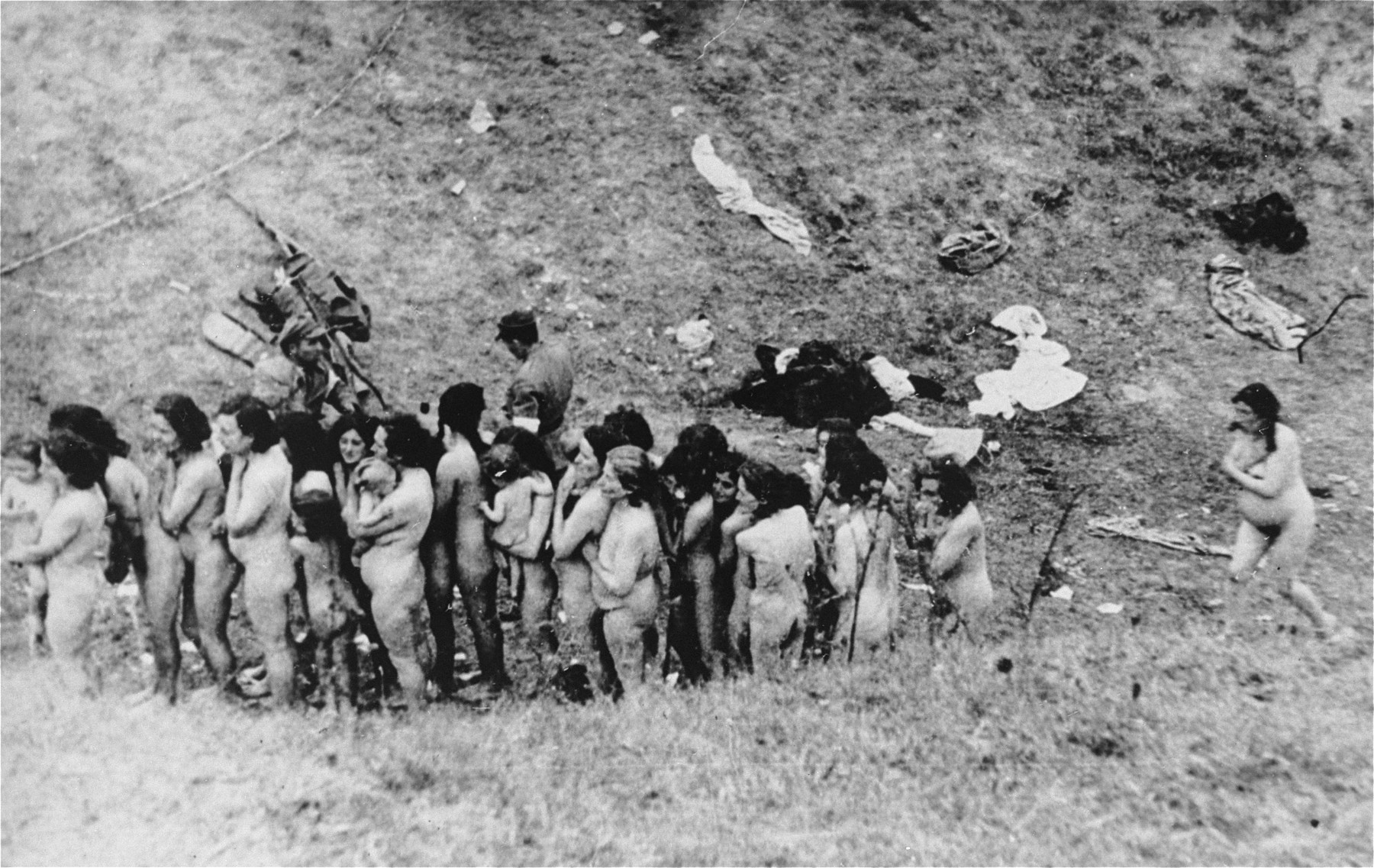
Naked Jewish women wait in a line before their execution by German Police with the assistance of Ukrainian auxiliaries.14 October 1942

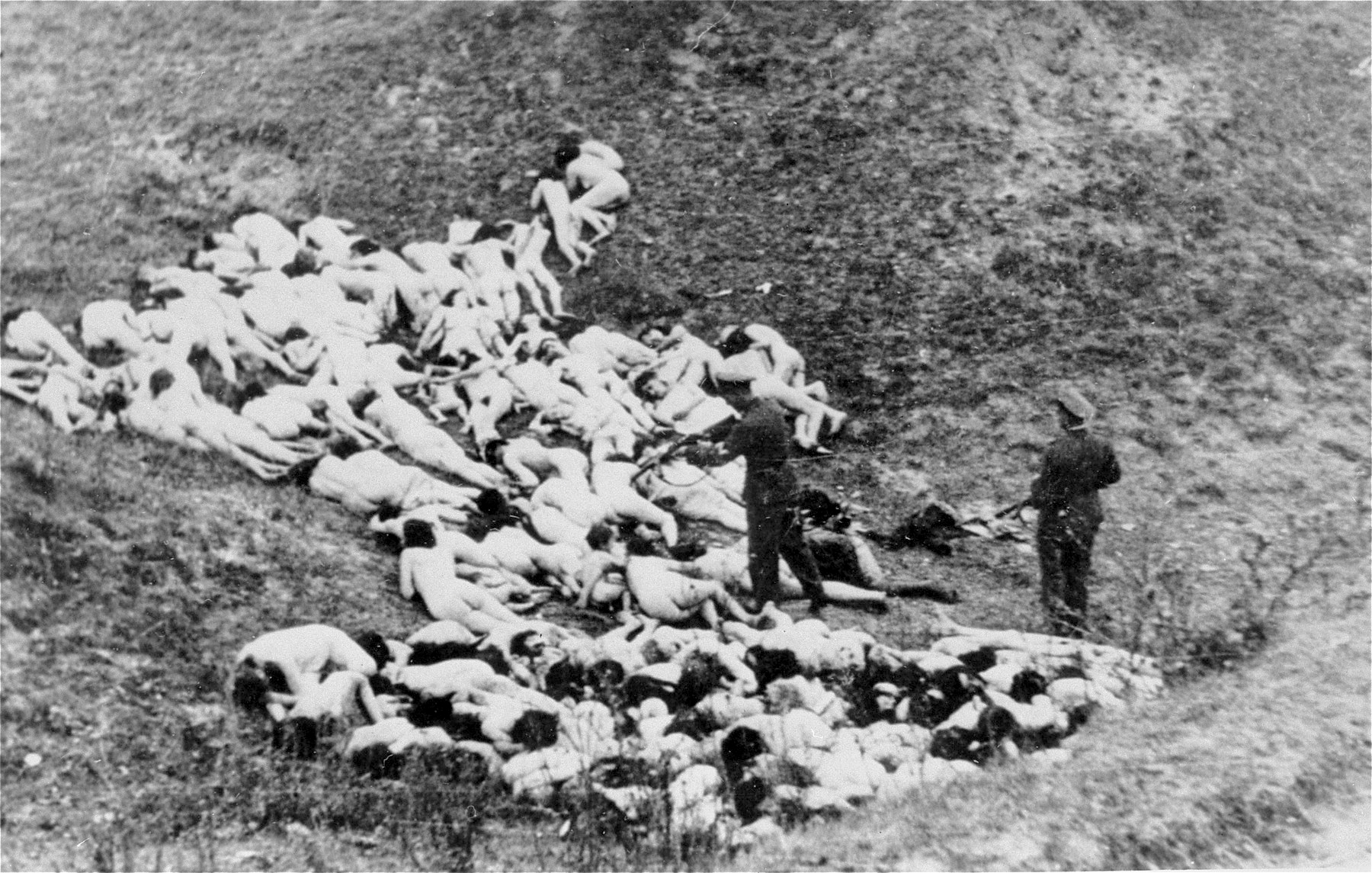
German police officer shooting women still alive after a mass execution in the Mizoch ghetto, 14 October 1942

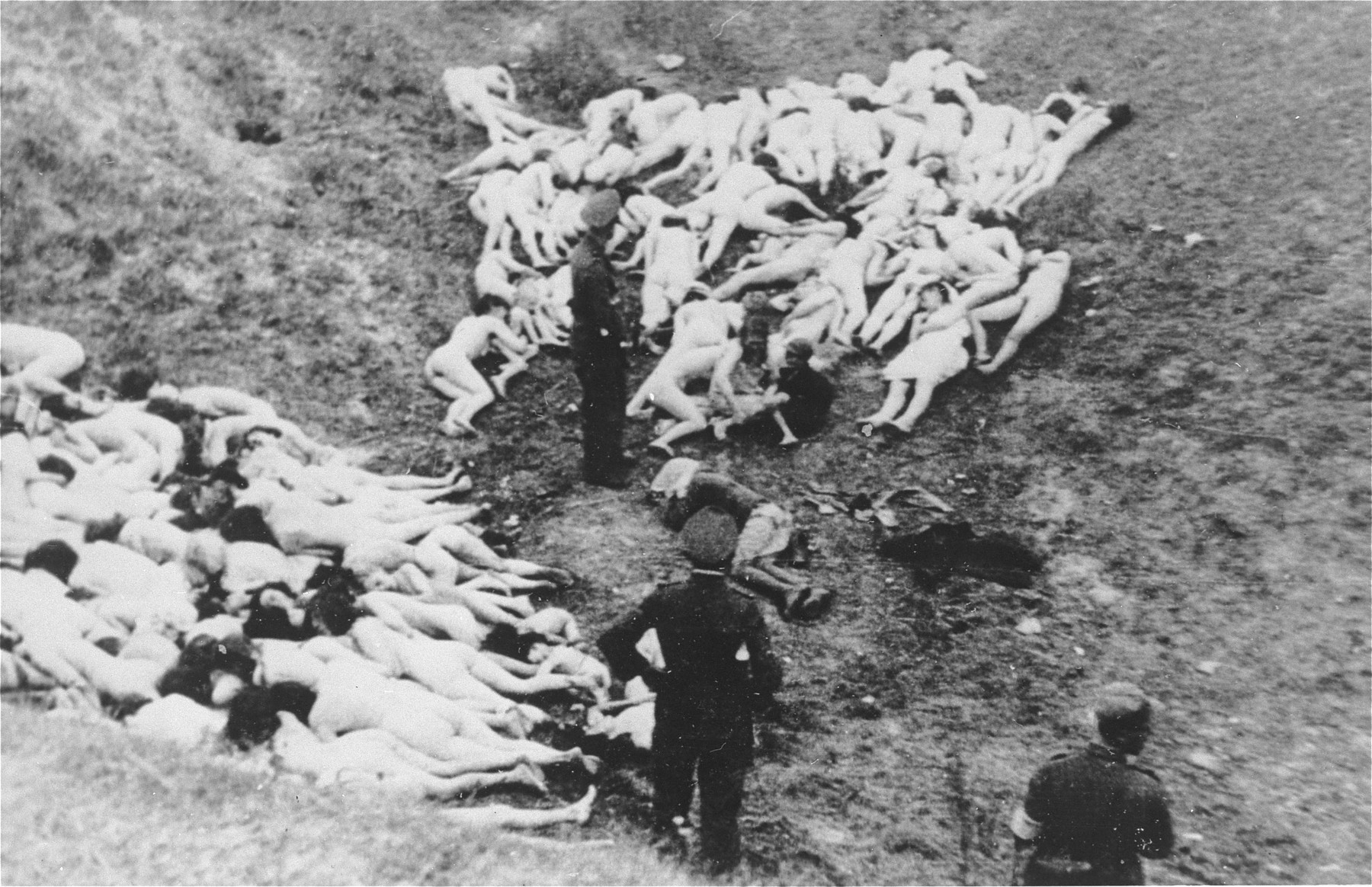
A German policeman prepares to complete the Mizocz mass execution by shooting two Jewish children, 14 October 1942

The shootings were photographed. The images, owned by SS-Unterscharführer Schäfer until 1945, became part of the Ludwigsburg investigation (ZSt. II 204 AR 1218/70). They were published, and have become well known. Frequently the photographs are erroneously said to depict other Holocaust shootings.

Two of the photographs show the "Aktion" in progress. The photographs give clear evidence of the execution practice common during the Holocaust by bullet in Reichskommissariat Ukraine. The victims were led to the killing place in groups of five or so individuals, and forced to lie down among the prior victims, to be shot in the back of the neck or head, with a single bullet. Historians have commented upon the brutality shown in the Mizocz mass murder photographs:

In 1942 at Mizocz, in the region of Rovno in Ukraine, approximately 1,700 Jews were executed. The photographs show large numbers of people being herded into a ravine, women and children undressing, a line of naked women and children in a queue and finally their executed bodies. Two particular harrowing photographs show German police standing among heaps of naked corpses of women strewn on either side of the ravine.

The archival description of the entire set of photographs by the United States Holocaust Memorial Museum (USHMM) includes the following statements. Photograph #17876: "According to the Zentrale Stelle in Germany (Zst. II 204 AR 1218/70), these Jews were collected by the German Gendarmerie and Ukrainian Schutzmannschaft during the liquidation of the Mizocz ghetto, which held roughly 1,700 Jews." Photograph #17877: "Naked Jewish women, some of whom are holding infants, wait in a line before their execution by German Sipo and SD with the assistance of Ukrainian auxiliaries." Photograph #17878: "German police officer shoots Jewish women still alive after a mass execution (Zst. II 204 AR 1218/70)." Photograph #17879: a "German policeman prepares to complete a mass execution by shooting two Jewish children."

=== Aftermath ===
Mizocz was later the site of the OUN-UPA massacre of about 100 Poles by Ukrainian nationalists in late August 1943. Some 60 percent of the homes were set on fire and burned. Among the victims was Ukrainian carpenter Mr Zachmacz and his entire family, murdered along with the Poles because he refused to enter the fray. His eight-year-old son survived hiding with the Poles.

Following World War II, Poland's borders were redrawn and Mizoch was incorporated into the Ukrainian SSR. The Jewish community was never restored. After the dissolution of the Soviet Union, the town became part of independent Ukraine.
