= Yurii Lavreniuk =

Ukrainian civil servant (born 1980)

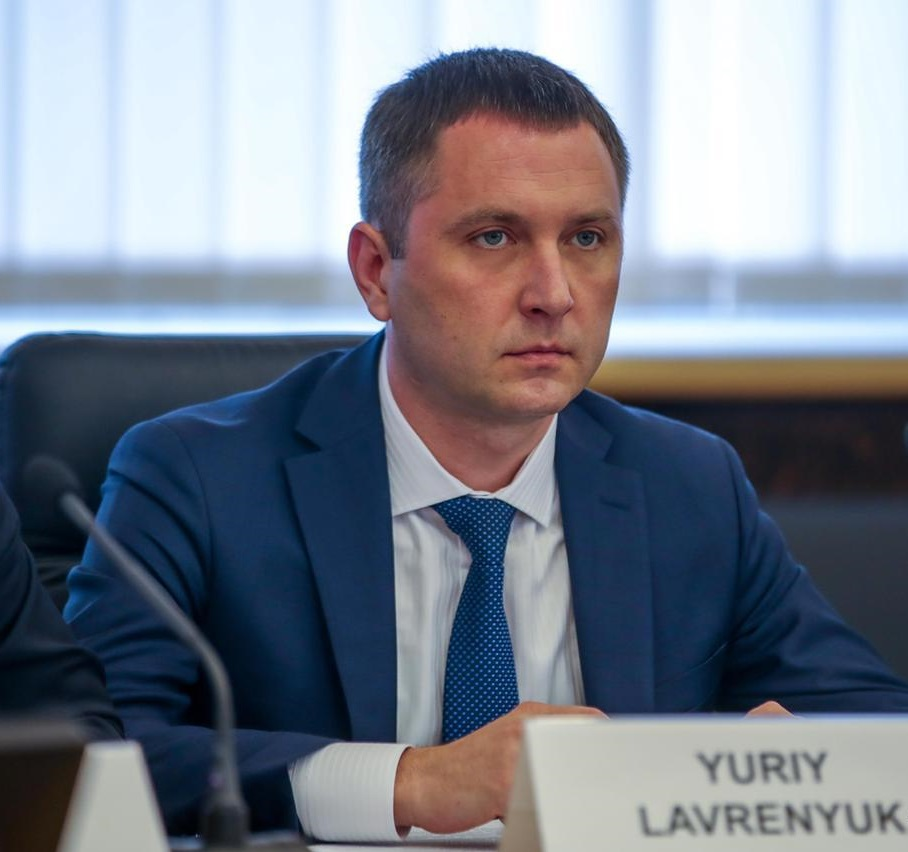
- Born: April 25, 1980 (age 46); Derman, Zdolbuniv district, Rivne Oblast, Ukraine
- Citizenship: Ukraine
- Education: Ternopil Academy of National Economy
- Occupation: civil servant

Yurii Lavreniuk (born April 25, 1980) is a Ukrainian civil servant, PhD (Philosophy Doctor) in public administration; Deputy Minister of Infrastructure of Ukraine (2016-2019), member of the National Council on Anti-Corruption Policy (2019-2020), veteran of the war in Donbas (2014-2015).

== Biography ==
Yurii Lavreniuk was born on April 25, 1980, in the village of Derman, Zdolbuniv district, Rivne region, Ukrainian SSR.

From 1995 to 1999, he studied at the Kamianets-Podilskyi Industrial Technical School at the Electrical Engineering Faculty.

From 2000 to 2004, he studied at the Ternopil Academy of National Economy, Institute of Finance.

From 2010 to 2014, he got MPA at the National Academy of Public Administration under the President of Ukraine.

=== Career ===
In 1999, he started working in the 1st territorial department of the State Service for Special Communication and Information Protection of Ukraine of the Security Service of Ukraine. In 2000, he transferred to the Ministry of Internal Affairs in the criminal investigation unit of the Kamianets-Podilskyi Ministry of Internal Affairs of the Ministry of Internal Affairs of Ukraine in the Khmelnytskyi region, where he held operational and managerial positions.

In 2006, Yurii Lavrenyuk co-founded the All-Ukrainian Special Board on Combating Corruption and Organized Crime. Lavreniuk was the chairman of the Board from 2006 to 2014.

In 2014, he returned to the Ministry of Internal Affairs. From 2014 to 2016, he held senior positions in the Ministry of Internal Affairs of Ukraine.

From 2014 to 2015, he was a participant in the Anti-Terrorist Operation in the East of Ukraine, a war veteran.

From May 18, 2016 to October 31, 2019, he was the Deputy Minister of Infrastructure of Ukraine.

From 2019 to 2020, he was a member of the National Council on Anti-Corruption Policy.

From May 2019 to June 2020, he was a member of the Supervisory Board of the SE "Boryspil International Airport".

Since February 2020, he is the vice president of operations in Eastern Europe, Asia and the Middle East of LAVR INTERNATIONAL LLC USA.

== Awards ==
- The "Honor, Courage, Law" award of the Verkhovna Rada of Ukraine
- The award of the Ministry of Internal Affairs of Ukraine "Firearm"
