= Battle of Gurby =

- Part of Anti-Soviet resistance by the Ukrainian Insurgent Army
| Date | 21–25 April 1944 |
| Location | Gurby, Ukraine |
| Result | See § Aftermath |

Belligerents
| Ukrainian Insurgent Army | Soviet Union |

Commanders and leaders
| Vasyl Kuk; Petro Oliinyk; Mykola Svystun; Ivan Lys † | Mikhail Marchenkov; (WIA) |

Strength
| 5,000 partisans 500–1,000 militiamen 2 artillery batteries 15 motars | 30,000–35,000 soldiers 5–15 light tanks |

Casualties and losses
| 400 killed 400 captured Other estimates: Per UPA: 80 killed 100–200 wounded 12 captured; Per NKVD: 2,018 killed 1,570 captured | Hundreds killed and wounded Other estimates: Per UPA: 900–2,000 killed 300–900 wounded 5 tanks disabled; Per NKVD: 11 killed 46 wounded |
- 2,000 civilians killed

The Battle of Gurby (Ukrainian: Бій під Гурбами), according to the Institute of History of the National Academy of Sciences of Ukraine, the largest battle that took place 21–25 April 1944 near the village of Gurby (also spelled Hurby) in the south of Zdolbuniv Raion, between the USSR NKVD troops and UPA forces. It ended with breakthrough of Ukrainian fighters from the encirclement. The number of military and civilian casualties is not precisely known.

The battle took place during the transition of UPA units across the Soviet-German front. The defeated German troops were no longer a threat to the UPA units, so the NKVD departments were the greatest danger to the Ukrainian insurgents.

== Background ==
Soviet successes in Belarus and Ukraine in 1944 led to a rapid German retreat. But along with the German retreat, the Red Army was moving westwards. It was at this time that the Ukrainian insurgent movement reached its peak – in 1943–1944 the UPA had 30 to 100 thousand soldiers in its ranks.

Since the German army was rapidly retreating and no longer posed a threat to the UPA and Ukraine as a whole, Slovak units had long since stopped fighting Ukrainian insurgent units, and the Hungarian military command had even signed a secret treaty of mutual non-aggression with the UPA, the Soviet troops posed a serious threat to the UPA. The locals expected a repeat of the repressions of 1939–1941.

Failing to meet significant resistance from the UPA troops, the Red Army continued its offensive against the German positions. The Soviet command sent several NKVD divisions to fight the "OUN gangs" who were in the rear. After the main forces of the Red Army passed through Western Ukraine, the UPA organised a number of military actions that were directed against NKVD troops, communists and civilians.

According to Petro Mirchuk, the main reason that led to the fighting at Gurby was an assassination attempt on the commander of the 1st Ukrainian Front, Nikolai Vatutin, committed by a UPA detachment on 29 February 1944 near the village of Myliatyn. A SMERSH task force of 60 men was sent to search for the UPA hundred. But even by the time they arrived, the rebels, as well as the vast majority of the inhabitants of Milyatin, had managed to withdraw into the forest. In response to Vatutin's death, the NKVD began large-scale punitive operations against the UPA. One of the tasks was to destroy a large UPA grouping in the Kremenets forest area.

== Force ratio ==
Formations of the UPA North ("Bogun" (Ukr. "Богун"), commanded by Petro Oliinyk) and UPA South (commanded by Vasyl Kuk) took part in the battle. The approximate strength was 5,000. Also joining the UPA were about 500–1000 people from the surrounding villages of Gurby and Antonivka, who were seeking protection for their families from the Bolsheviks. They were sent deep into the forest, tasked with helping the wounded and taking them away from the battlefield.

Against the insurgents, the NKVD used 5 brigades of soldiers and some Red Army units, aviation, 15 light tanks, and a regiment of cavalry. All in all, about 30,000 soldiers and officers. The aeroplanes were used for reconnaissance to identify large concentrations of UPA troops.

Before the battle of Gurby, there was a small skirmish between UPA and NKVD units near the village of Moskalivka). According to contemporary Ukrainian historians, the insurgents won the battle.

== Battle ==
On 20 April 1944, the Soviets concentrated most of their troops on the line Shepetivka – Rivne – Zbarazh. On the morning of 21 April, UPA soldiers began digging chancers and installing cannons. A field hospital was deployed. The first attack of the NKVD troops took place at noon from the west, north and south, but the UPA fighters managed to repel the attack.

The second attack took place on 23 April. The NKVD troops managed to squeeze the UPA's flanks with flanking blows, as a result of which the insurgents found themselves in a "sack". Finally, on the morning of 24 April, the NKVD command decided to launch a general offensive. After an artillery bombardment of the UPA positions, the NKVD troops moved on the insurgents in an avalanche. The next day, having broken through the defence line of commander Yasen, the NKVD troops surrounded and destroyed Storchan's camp. Storchan himself, four petty officers and about 60 insurgents were killed. By 16:00 Soviet military units launched an offensive from the south-west, causing the rebel units to retreat deep into the Gurby forest.

On the night of 23–24 April 1944, UPA troops tried for the first time to break through the enemy's ring, but this attempt was unsuccessful and they were forced to take the battle in the Gurbenskie forests. The main battles first took place in the villages, but then the UPA was forced to retreat deep into the Gurby Forest.

On 24 April 1944 the UPA command decided that it was necessary to break out of the encirclement and organise a breakthrough attempt. The reasons cited were "limited ammunition and food supplies" (this information does not correspond to the NKVD report, which spoke of the huge amount of ammunition, weapons, and food captured after the battle). The hospital was disbanded. The lightly wounded fighters joined the combat units, and the seriously wounded, together with the civilian population, were divided into several groups, which had to infiltrate across the front line while the main forces diverted the attention of the NKVD troops. On the morning of 25 April, the insurgents in three groups began to withdraw from the encirclement near the village of Bushcha.

== Aftermath ==
Each side involved in this battle declared victory. The UPA, as usual, announced in an order that "enemy losses were 10 times greater than their own". later, enemy losses increased – up to 17 to 20 times or more. The rebels destroyed most of the Soviet troops, but the losses of the rebels themselves were evidenced by the strong reorganisation and later the unification of the UPA North and UPA South groups. The NKVD captured about 100 UPA fighters. Soon all the captives were executed. During the NKVD offensive on the rebel positions, which broke out of the encirclement, the commander of the kuren Mamai died. Some other centurions and platoon leaders committed suicide to avoid being captured by the enemy.

== Losses of parties ==
=== Soviet Union ===
Around 27 April, the command of the internal forces of the NKVD troops wrote a report to the commander of the 1st Ukrainian Front, Marshal of the Soviet Union Zhukov, on the results of the operation to eliminate the "OUN gangs" in the Kremenets forests of the Rivne region.

It noted that a huge amount of ammunition, weapons, Soviet and German uniforms, food and barrels of petrol were captured. The report also referred to a captured working U-2 aircraft.

According to the Soviet side, UPA losses were 2,018 killed and 1,570 prisoners of war.

In the official report Beria, compiled for Stalin, Molotov and Chief of the General Staff of the Red Army Antonov indicated that in the fighting from 21 to 27 April losses of the NKVD were 11 killed and 46 wounded.

=== UPA ===
A description of the battle near Gurby was published in the newspaper of the Regional Cell of the OUN Provision "Na zminu" in July 1950. The newspaper described the battle in detail and also noted the losses of both sides: "...80 insurgents were killed in the battle near Gurby. The Bolshevik losses totaled over 1,800 killed and many wounded...".

Vasyl Kuk in his interview to Oleksandr Gogun stated that the UPA lost no more than 100 people, while the insurgents killed 1700 Soviet soldiers and wounded the same number of others.

According to other data, the losses of Soviet troops totaled 120 people, Ukrainian insurgents – 80 plus Wehrmacht casualties, who support the nationalists. The State Archive of the Russian Federation contains a review of an unidentified person from the UPA leadership dated 14 August 1944, which says that 80 UPA fighters and about 120 "Bolsheviks" were killed in the battle near Gurby.

== Literature ==
- Kyrychuk Yurii. History of the UPA. – Ternopil, 1991. – Chapter III.
- Mirchuk Petro. Ukrainian Insurgent Army 1942–1952: Prosvita Bookstore.
- Anatolii Kentii. The Armed Forces of Ukrainian Nationalists. Volume 1. – Kyiv, 2005.
- Yovyk Ivan. Unconquered Army – Memoirs – Kyiv: Lesya Publishing House, 1995.
- Skorupskyi Maksym. Memoirs of the Battle for Freedom – Kyiv, 1992.
- Sodol Petro. Ukrainian Insurgent Army 1943–49. Handbook. – New York: "Prologue, 1994.
- Gogun Oleksandr. Between Hitler and Stalin: the struggle of OUN-UPA. – St. Petersburg : "Neva", 2004. – 416 с. – (Secret materials) – 3500 primes -.ISBN 978-5-7654-3809-1.
- Centre for the Study of the Liberation Movement. Ukrainian Insurgent Army: History of the Unconquered – Lviv: Centre for Research on the Liberation Army, 2007. 352 p. – ISBN 978-966-8041-43-3.
- Tovsty V. P. Ukrainian Insurgent Army – Kharkiv: Promin, 2007. – ISBN 979-966-8826-00-8.
