= Mizoch =

Rural locality in Rivne Oblast, Ukraine

Mizoch Мізоч
- Rural settlement
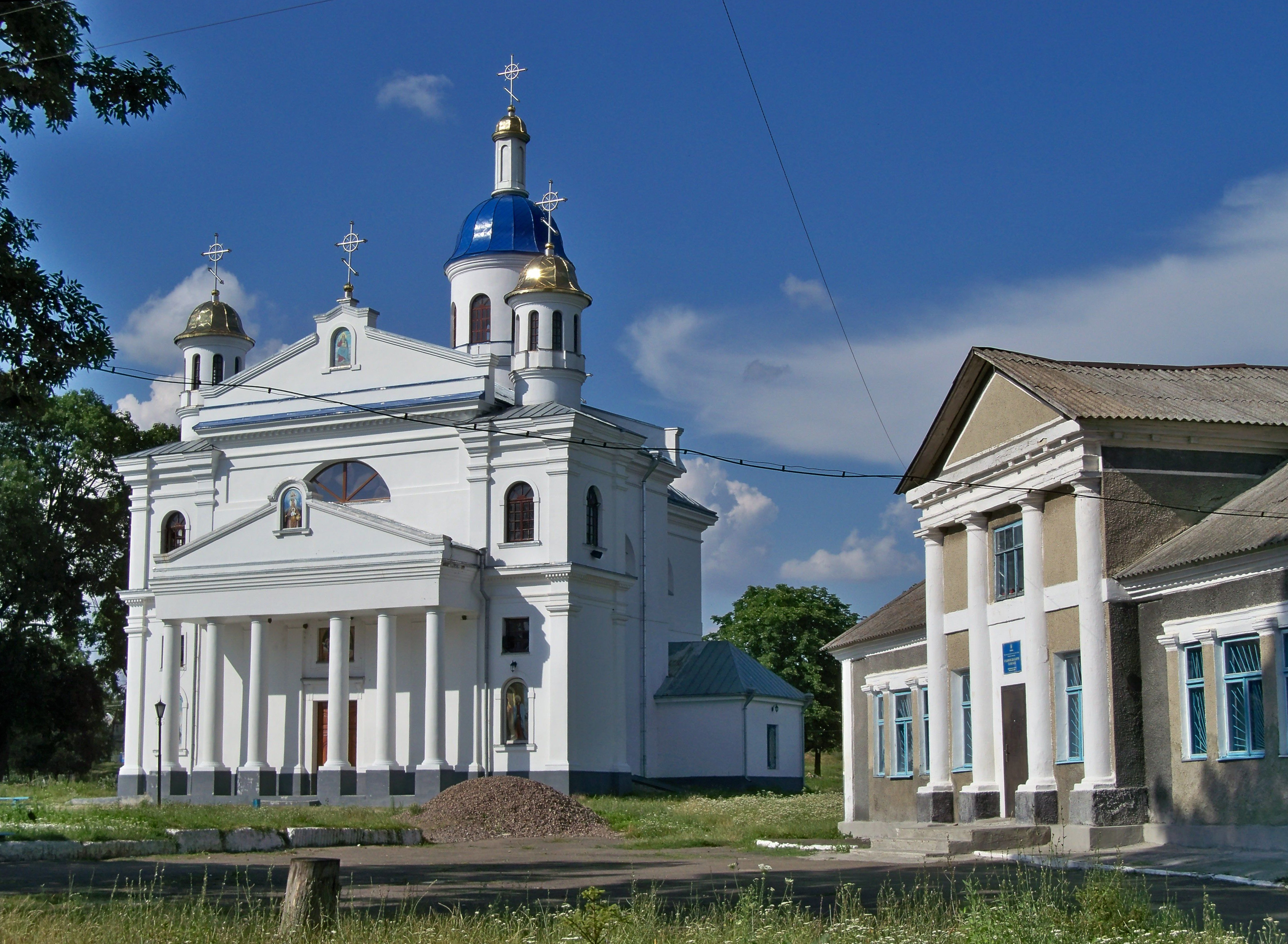
- Orthodox church in Mizoch after renovation

- Coat of arms

- Location within Rivne Oblast Location within Ukraine
- Coordinates: 50.4069°N 26.145°E
- Country: Ukraine
- Oblast: Rivne Oblast
- Raion: Rivne Raion
- Hromada: Mizoch settlement hromada
- Time zone: UTC+2 (EET)
  - Summer (DST): UTC+3 (EEST)

Mizoch (Ukrainian: Мізоч, Russian: Мизоч, Polish: Mizocz, Yiddish: מיזאָטש) is a rural settlement in Zdolbuniv Raion, Rivne Oblast, Ukraine, 30 km far from Rivne. Its population was 3,329 (2022 estimate).

== History ==
The first written record goes back to 1322. The confirmation of the city's legal status dates from 1429. In 1761, the King Augustus III of Poland granted Mizocz the Magdeburg Rights. The civic self-government placed the city Velykyi Mizoch (Greater Mizoch) in the Luts'k district. Between world wars, Mizocz was a multi-ethnic community like many others in eastern Poland, inhabited by Jews, Poles, and Ukrainians. There was a military school in Mizocz for the officer cadets of the Battalion 11 of the Polish Army's First Brigade; the Karwicki Palace (built in 1790, partly destroyed by the Bolsheviks in 1917), Hotel Barmocha Fuksa, a Catholic and an Orthodox church, and a Synagogue. The nearest major city was Równo.

In World War II, the town was invaded twice. It fell under the Nazi occupation in 1941. The Jewish inhabitants were first forced into the newly formed Mizocz Ghetto, from which they were taken out and slaughtered at a nearby ravine. The Jews of Mizoch endured constant abuse, were exploited as forced labourers and had their property confiscated. In spring 1942, a ghetto was created in Mizoch, which further worsened the situation of the Jews. Between 1,700 and 2,500 Jews were forced to live in the cramped confines of the ghetto. On the night of 13 October 1942, the liquidation of the ghetto began. The Security Police and SD (SS Security Service) from Rivne, along with the Zdolbuniv and Mizoch gendarmerie and auxiliary police, surrounded the ghetto and ordered all Jews to gather at the market. In resistance, a group of Jews set the buildings of the ghetto on fire. Almost half of the prisoners managed to escape; about 200 Jews died in the fire. The rest – between 800 and 1,700 people – were murdered over the course of two days in a ravine near this memorial.

The Jews who managed to escape the mass executions hid with villagers they knew, tried to survive in the forests or joined various partisan units. As a result of constant raids by the Germans and the auxiliary police, frequent denunciations by individual villagers, and the Ukrainian-Polish conflict, very few Jews survived to experience the end of the Nazi occupation in 1944.

In January 1989, the population was 4220 people.

The Gonfalon and modern emblem were approved by the city council on September 11, 1996.

Until 26 January 2024, Mizoch was designated urban-type settlement. On this day, a new law entered into force which abolished this status, and Mizoch became a rural settlement.

== Notable residents ==
- Sonia Peres, the wife of President and Prime Minister of Israel, Shimon Peres.

== Gallery ==
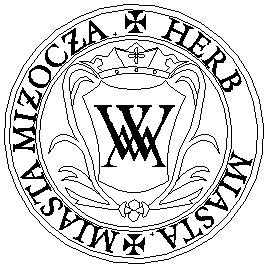
Polish–Lithuanian Commonwealth Emblem, Wielki Mizocz (W-M)

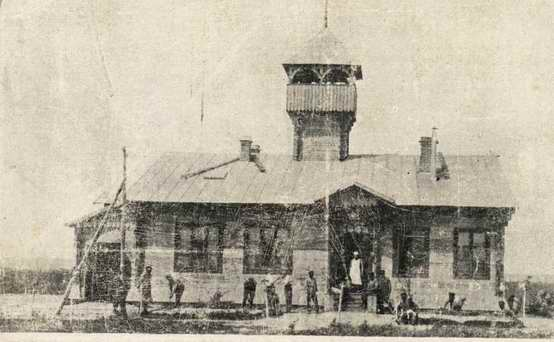
Watchtower of the Polish military school for the officer cadets, 1925

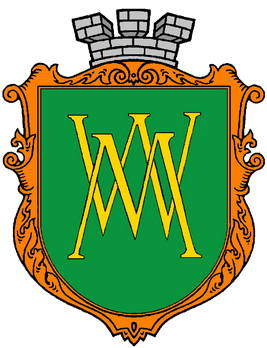
Present-day Emblem

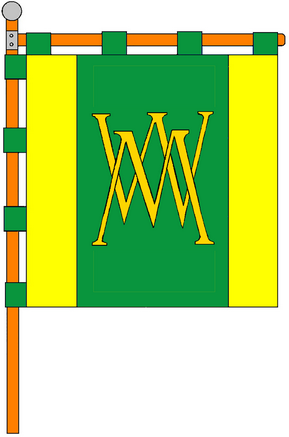
Gonfalon

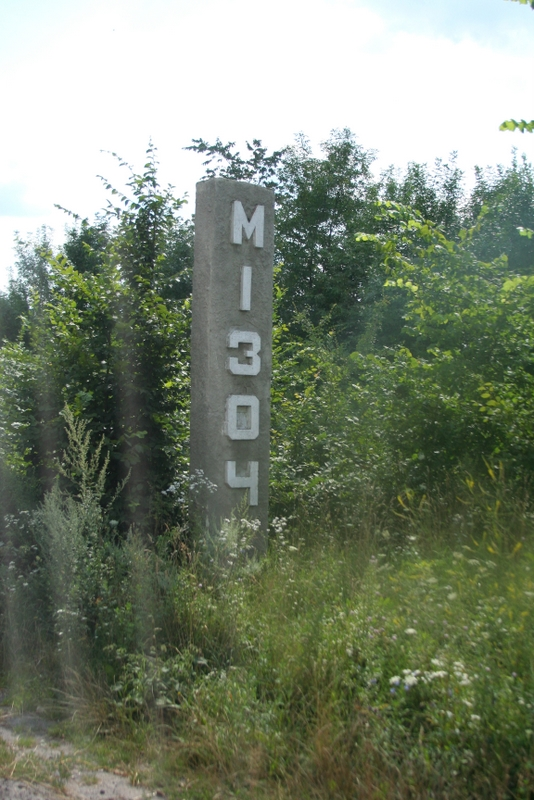
Roadsign
