= Zdolbuniv =

City in Rivne Oblast, Ukraine

Zdolbuniv Здолбунів Zdołbunów
- City
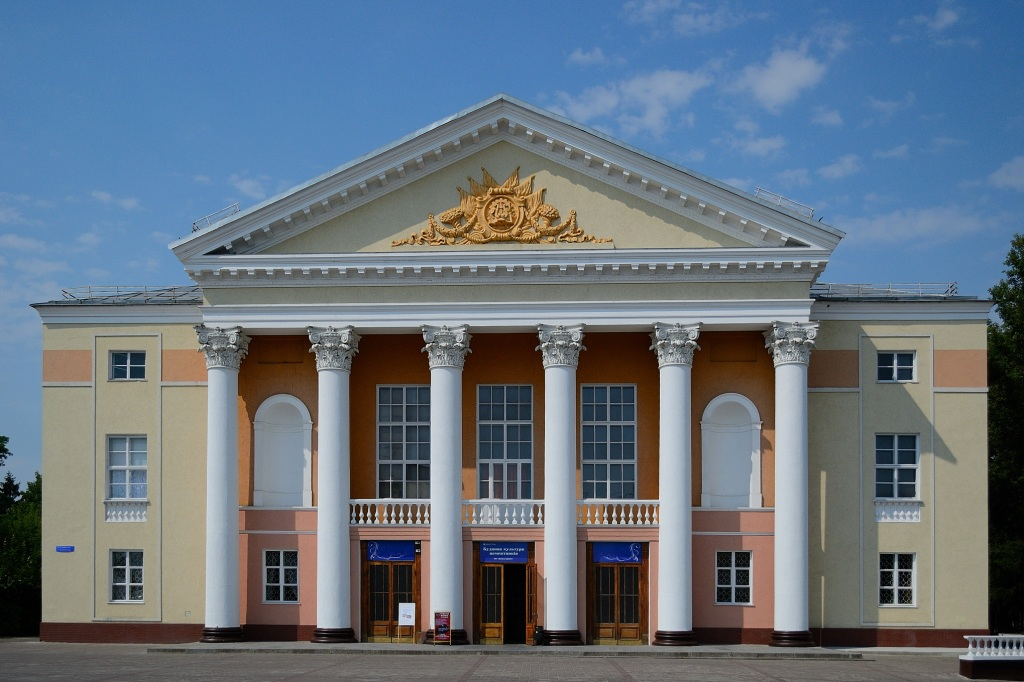
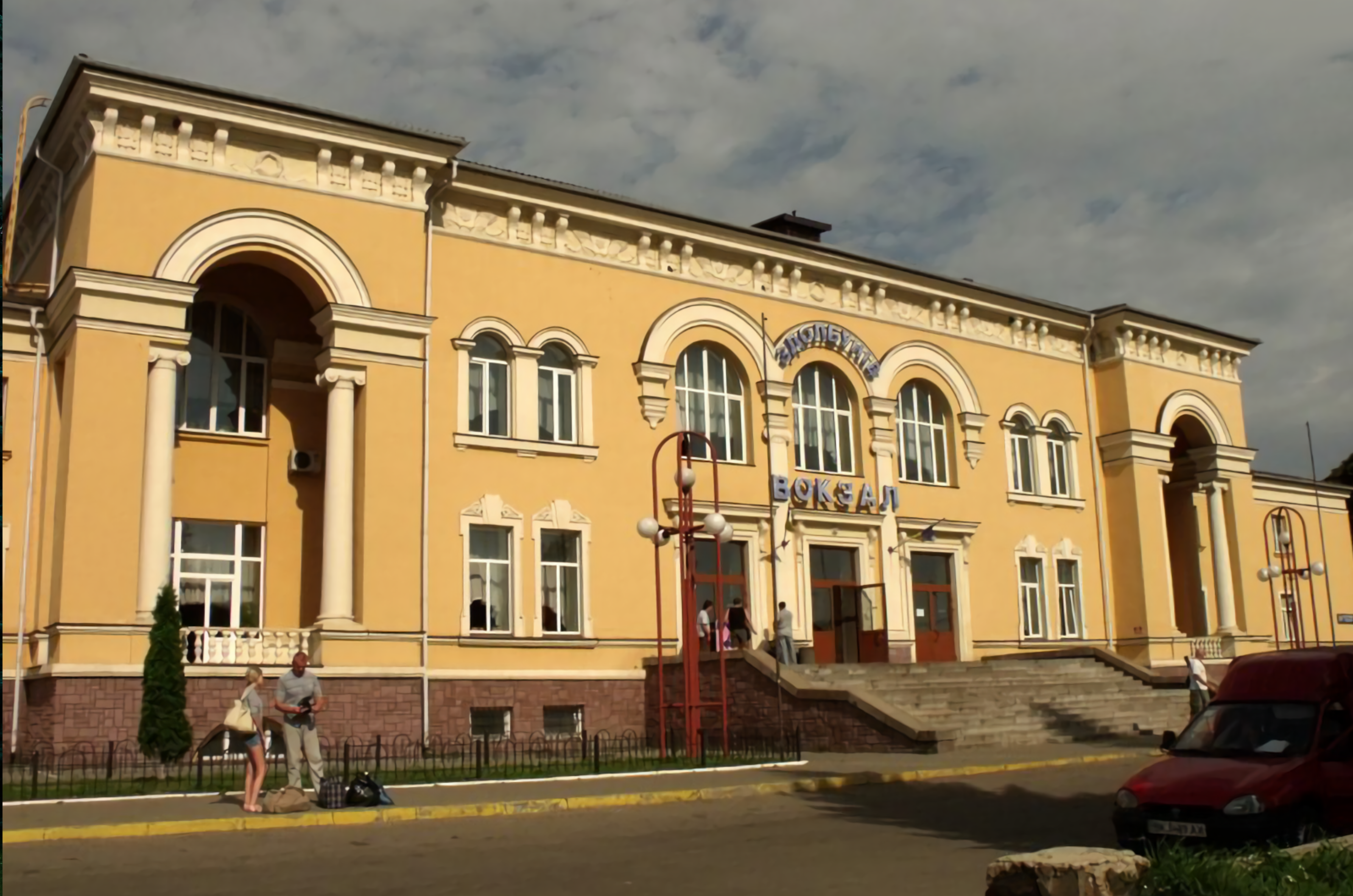
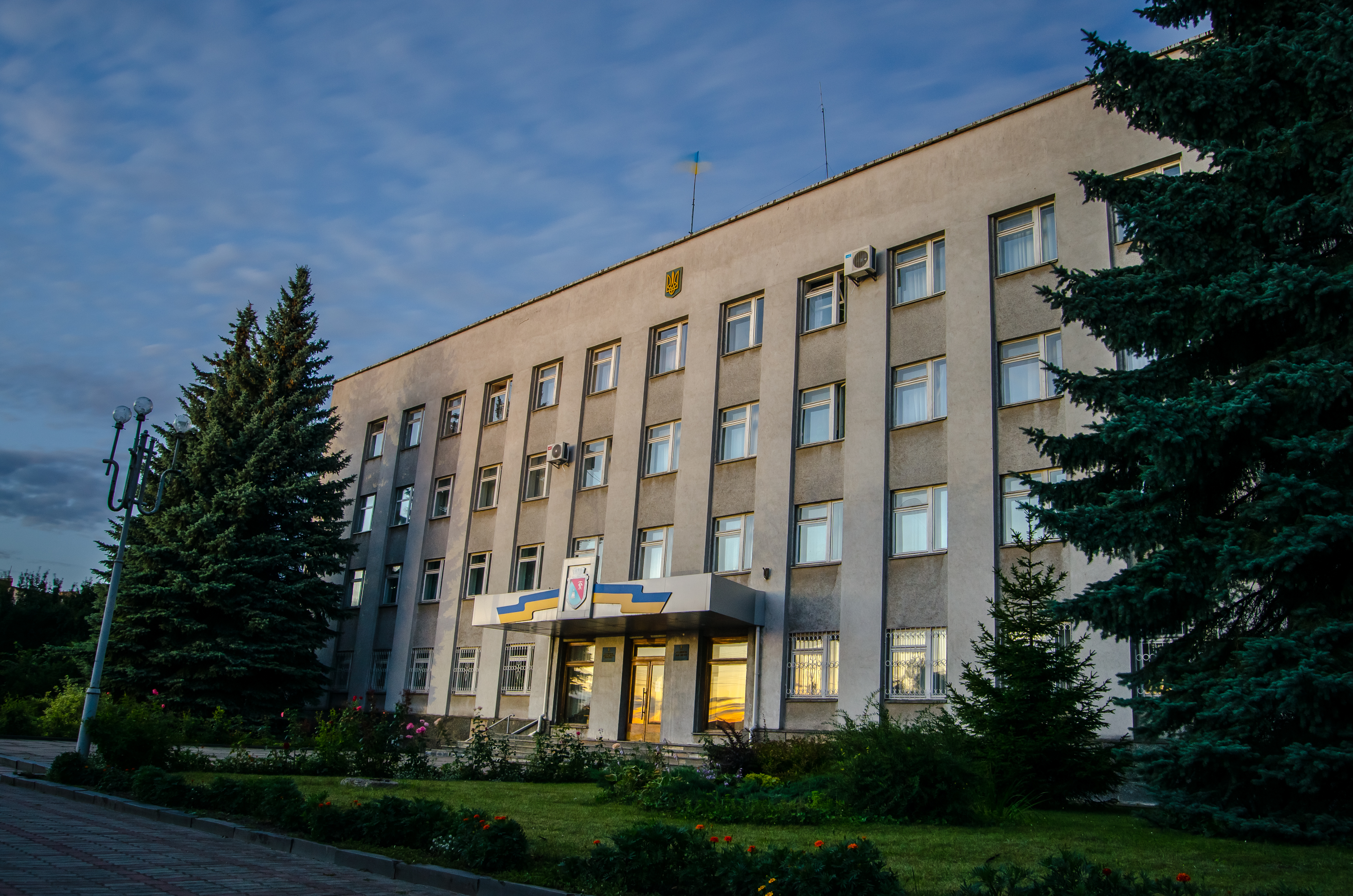
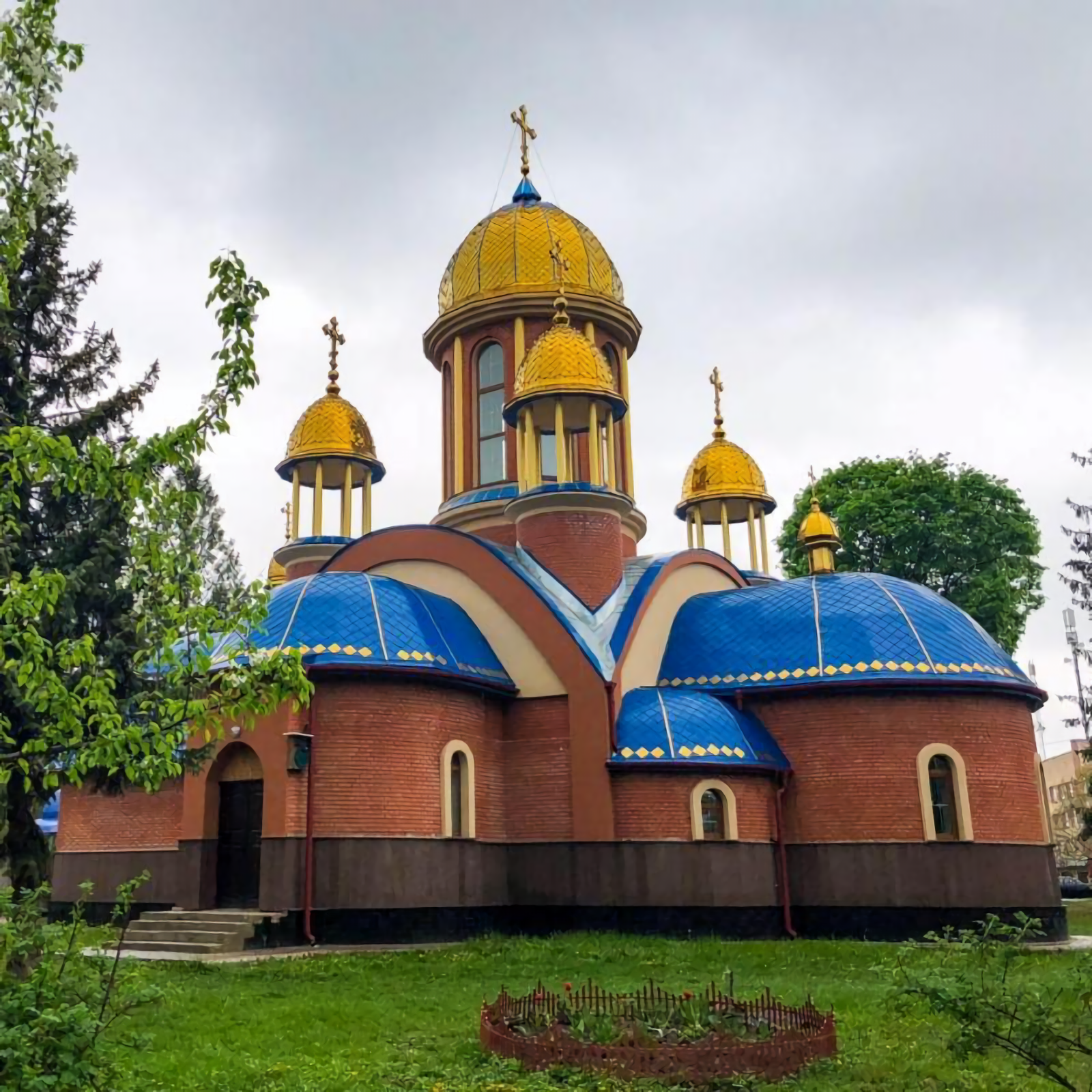
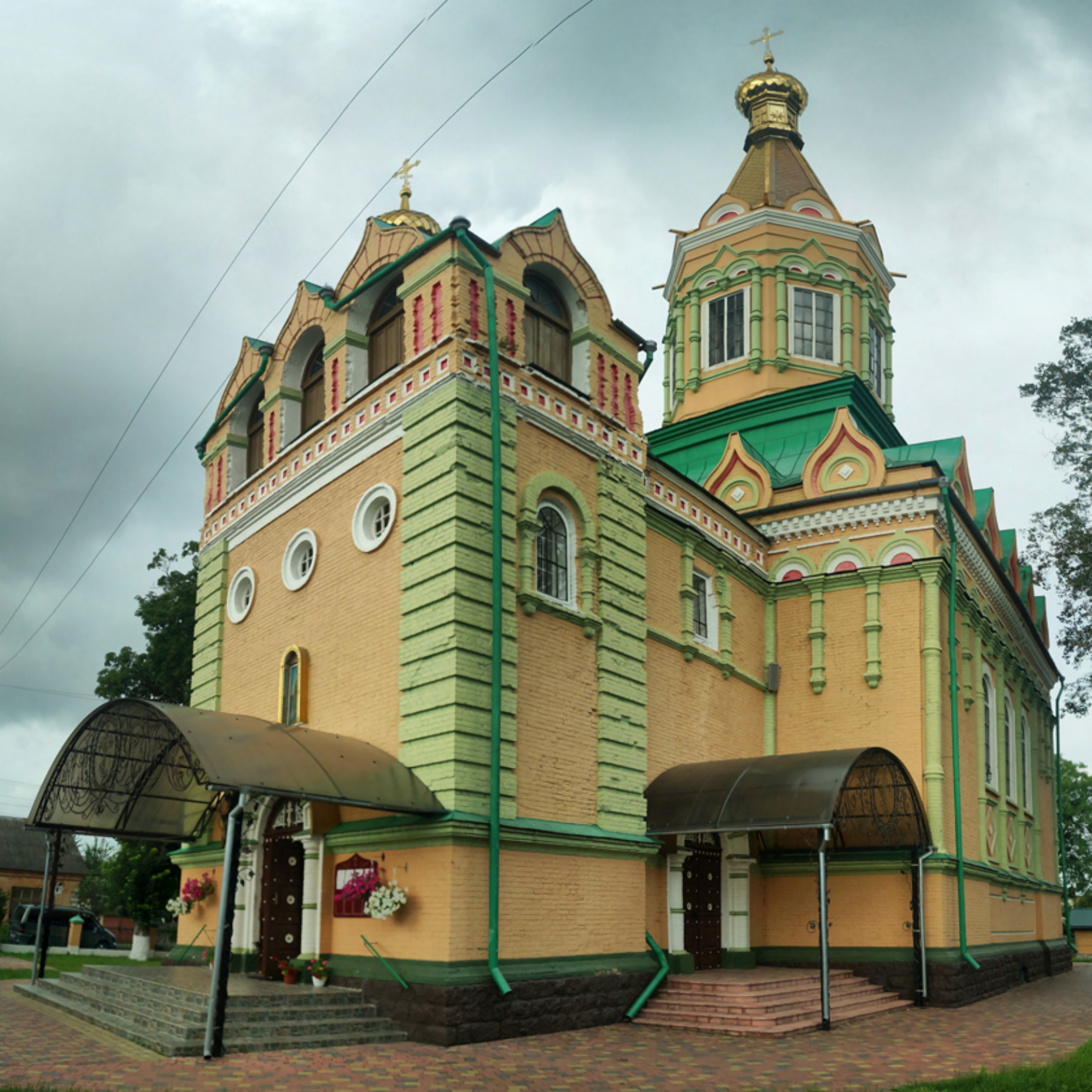
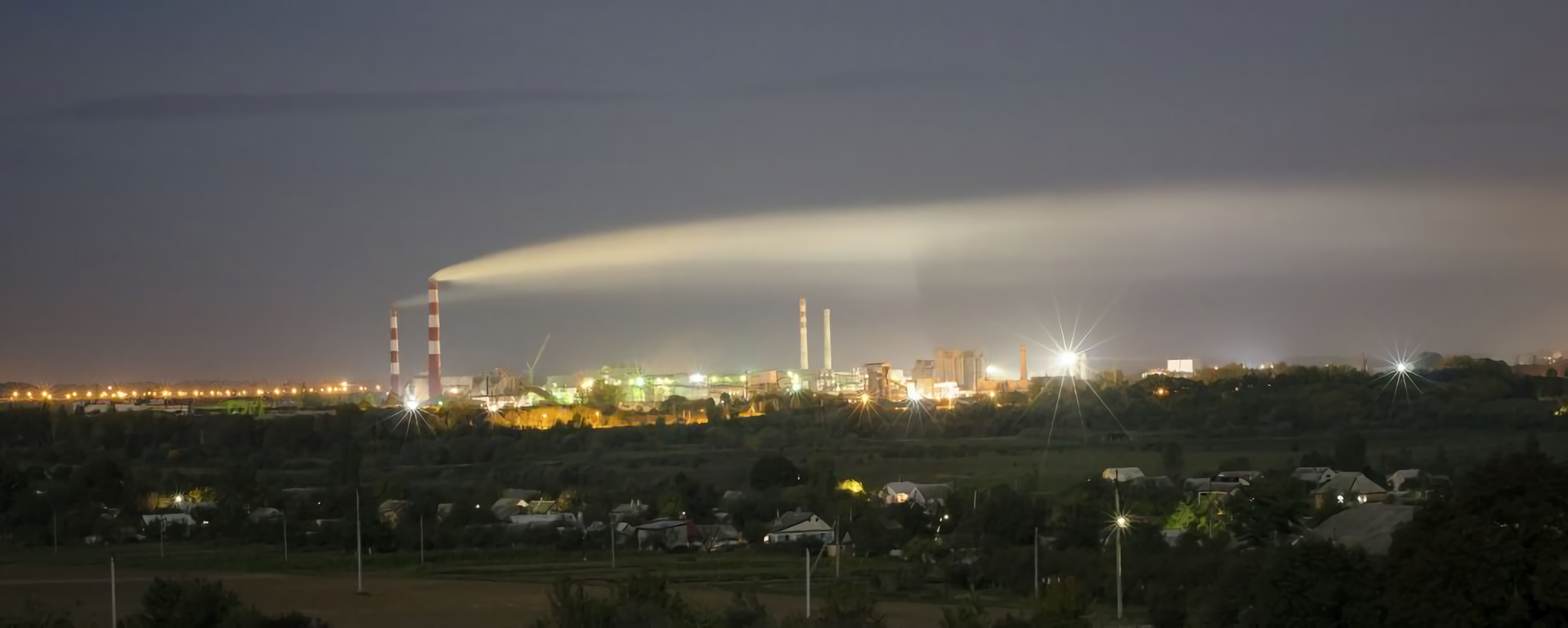
- Zdolbuniv city

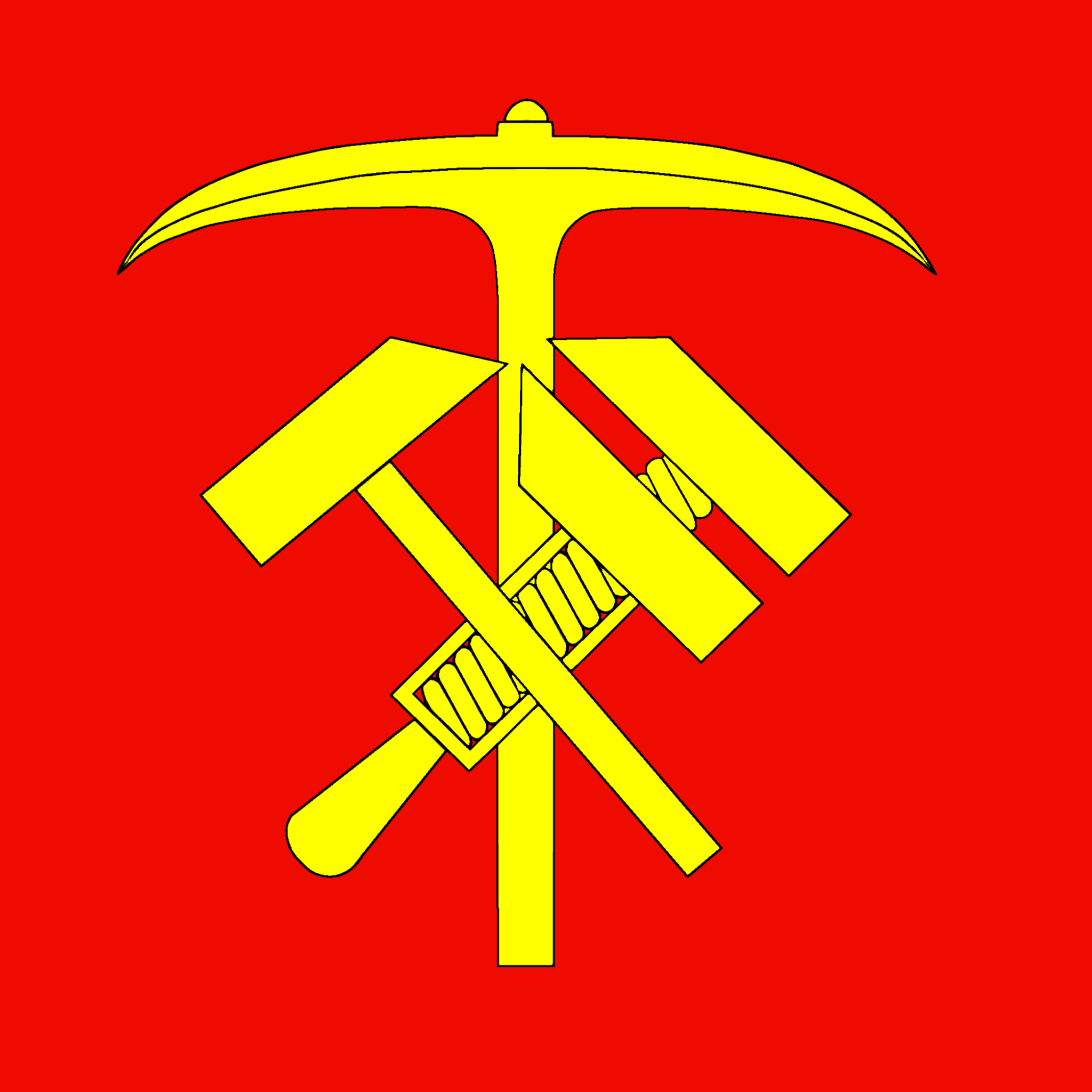
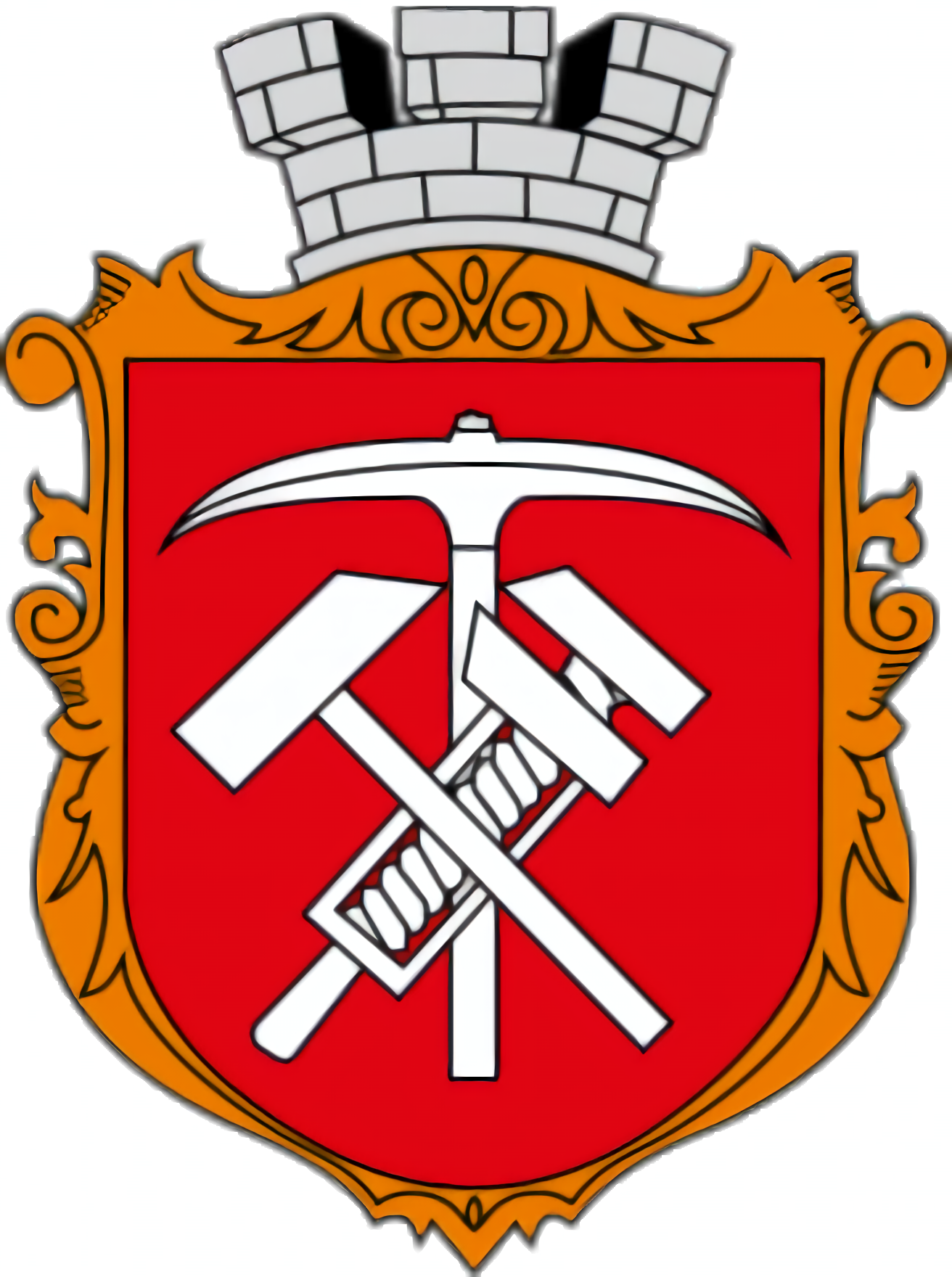
- Flag Coat of arms

- Location within Rivne Oblast Location within Ukraine
- Coordinates: 50°30′34″N 26°15′35″E
- Country: Ukraine
- Oblast: Rivne Oblast
- Raion: Rivne Raion
- Hromada: Zdolbuniv urban hromada
- First mentioned: 1497

Population (2022)
  - Total: 25,040

Zdolbuniv (Ukrainian: Здолбунів, IPA: [zdolˈbun⁽ʲ⁾iu̯]; Polish: Zdołbunów) is a city in the Rivne Raion of Rivne Oblast (province), in the historical region of Volhynia, western Ukraine. It has an important railway station and a cement plant (there is a deposit of chalk). Population: 25,040 (2022 estimate).

== History ==
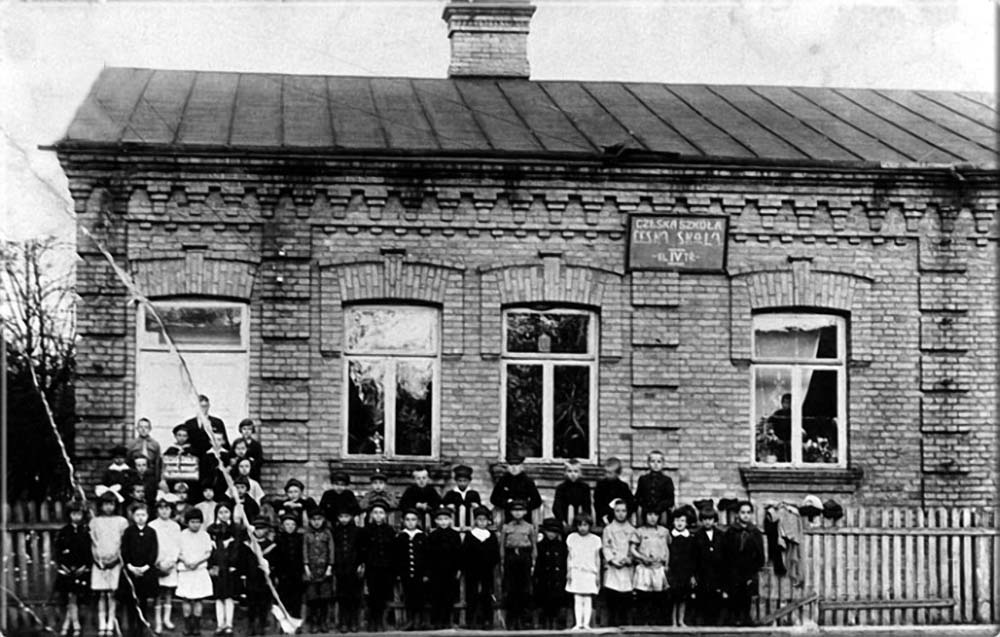
Czech school in 1917

The town was mentioned in 1497 in the deed, in which the Lithuanian Grand Duke and future King of Poland Alexander Jagiellon committed several villages to Prince Konstanty Ostrogski. Among the villages mentioned in the deed was Dolbunov. The town has had its present name of Zdolbuniv since 1629. In 1569, following the Union of Lublin, Zdolbuniv became part of the Kingdom of Poland, where it remained for over 200 years, until the Partitions of Poland. In 1793, it was annexed by the Russian Empire, and in the interbellum period, it again belonged to Poland. It was a powiat (country) centre in Wołyń Voivodeship during this period. Zdołbunów, as it was then known, was an important rail hub, located near the Polish-Soviet border. According to the 1921 census, the town had a mixed population, 40.0% Polish, 31.3% Ukrainian, 10.0% Jewish, 9,0% Russian, 8.9% Czech. By 1931 the population had grown to 10,000 inhabitants.

In September 1939, following the Soviet Invasion of Poland, Zdołbunów was captured by the Soviet Union, where it remained until the Operation Barbarossa. Its Jewish minority was murdered in the Holocaust, and in late 1943, Zdołbunów became a shelter for the ethnic Polish population of Volhynia, escaping the Volhynian Genocide. On February 3, 1944, the town was captured by the Red Army, and eventually annexed from Poland.

Prior to the administrative reform of 2020, it was the administrative center of the now abolished Zdolbuniv Raion.

== Economy ==
Zdolbuniv is an important railway junction, as well as a centre of cement and brick production. Railway repair workshops are located in the city.

== Notable people ==
Zdolbuniv is the birthplace of a contemporary Polish painter Stanislaw Fijalkowski (1922–2020), and singer Teresa Tutinas (born 1943)

== Gallery ==
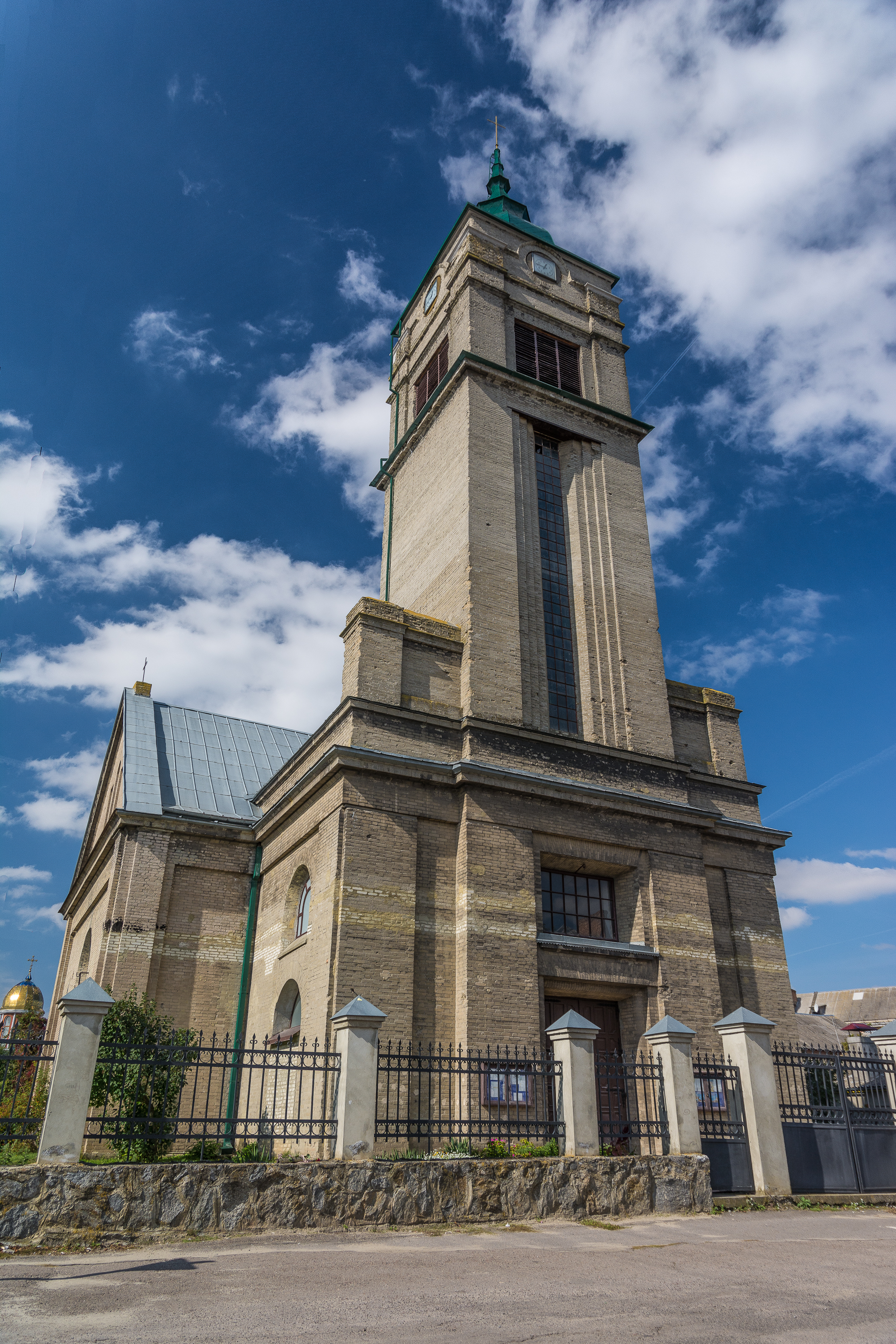
Catholic church of Sts. Peter and Paul

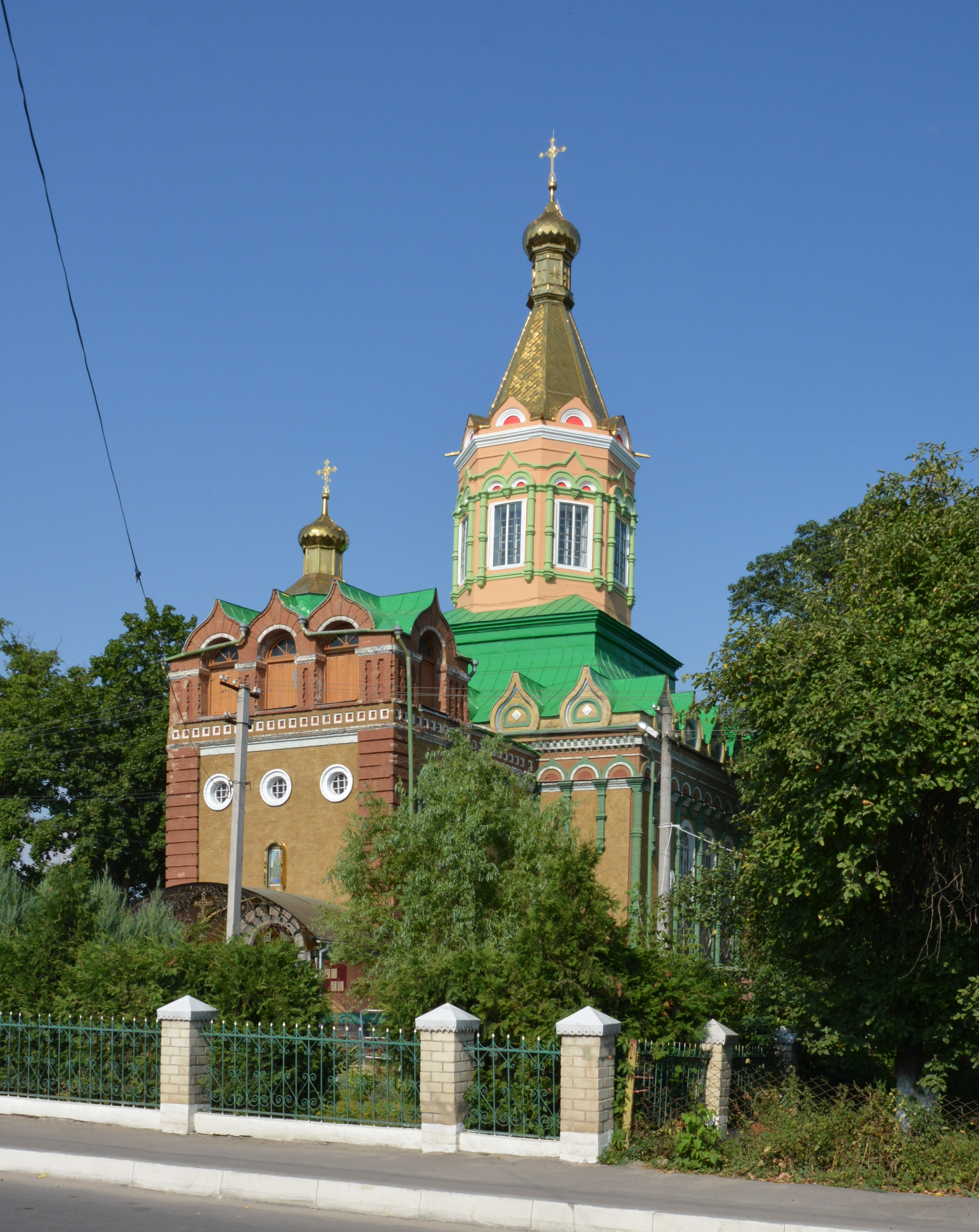
St. Catherine Church

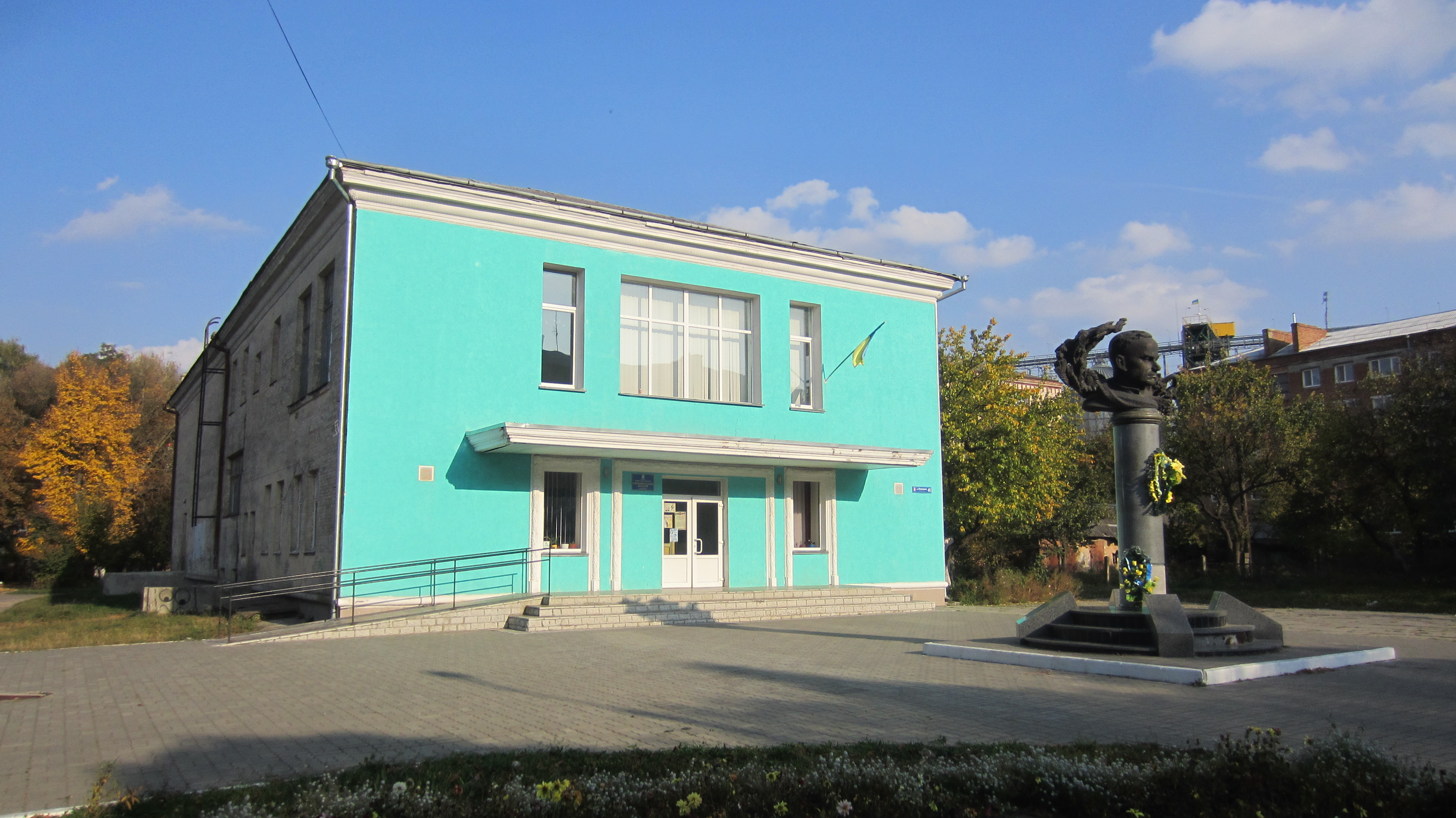
House of culture and bust of Ulas Samchuk

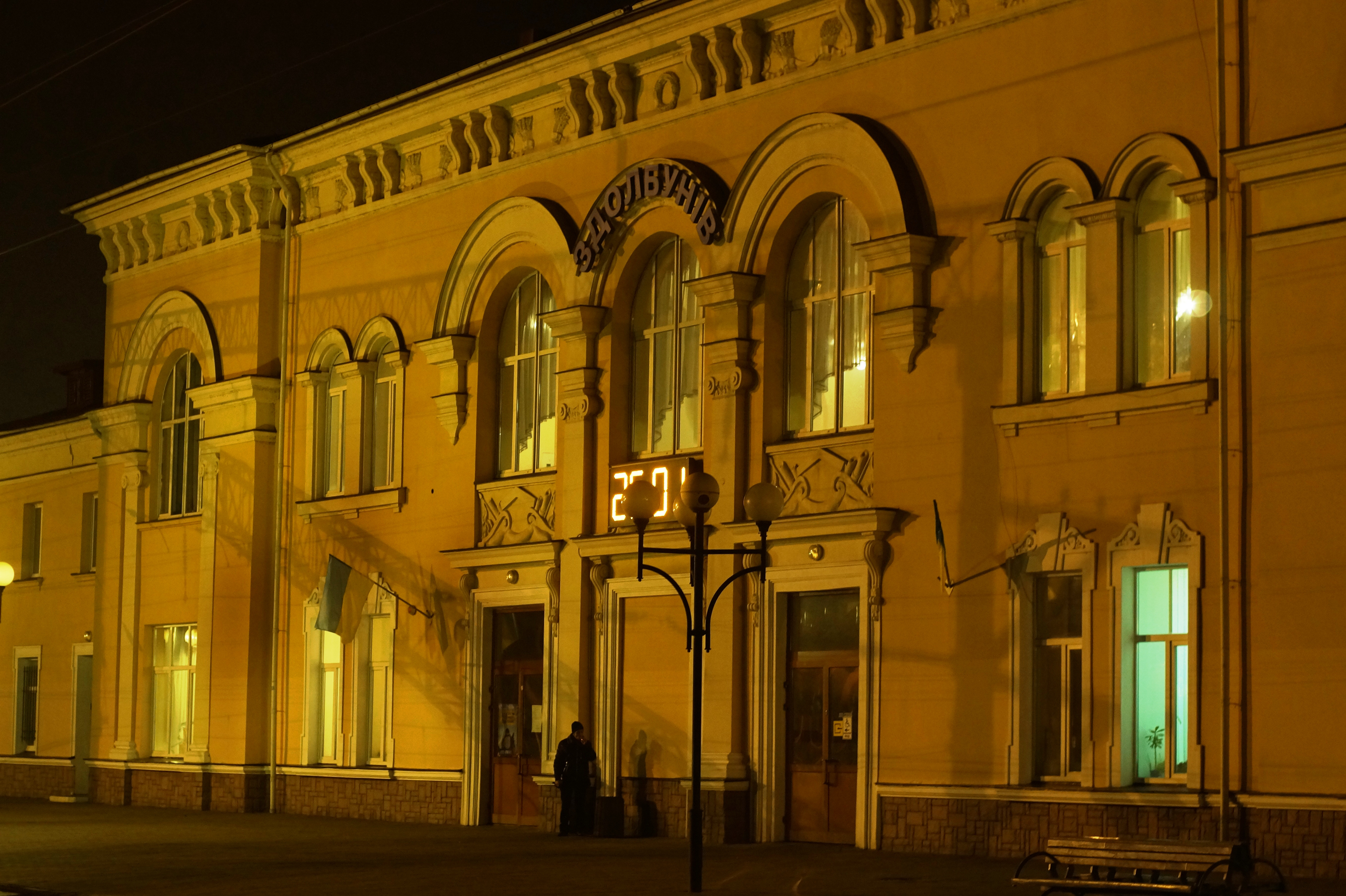
Zdolbuniv railway station

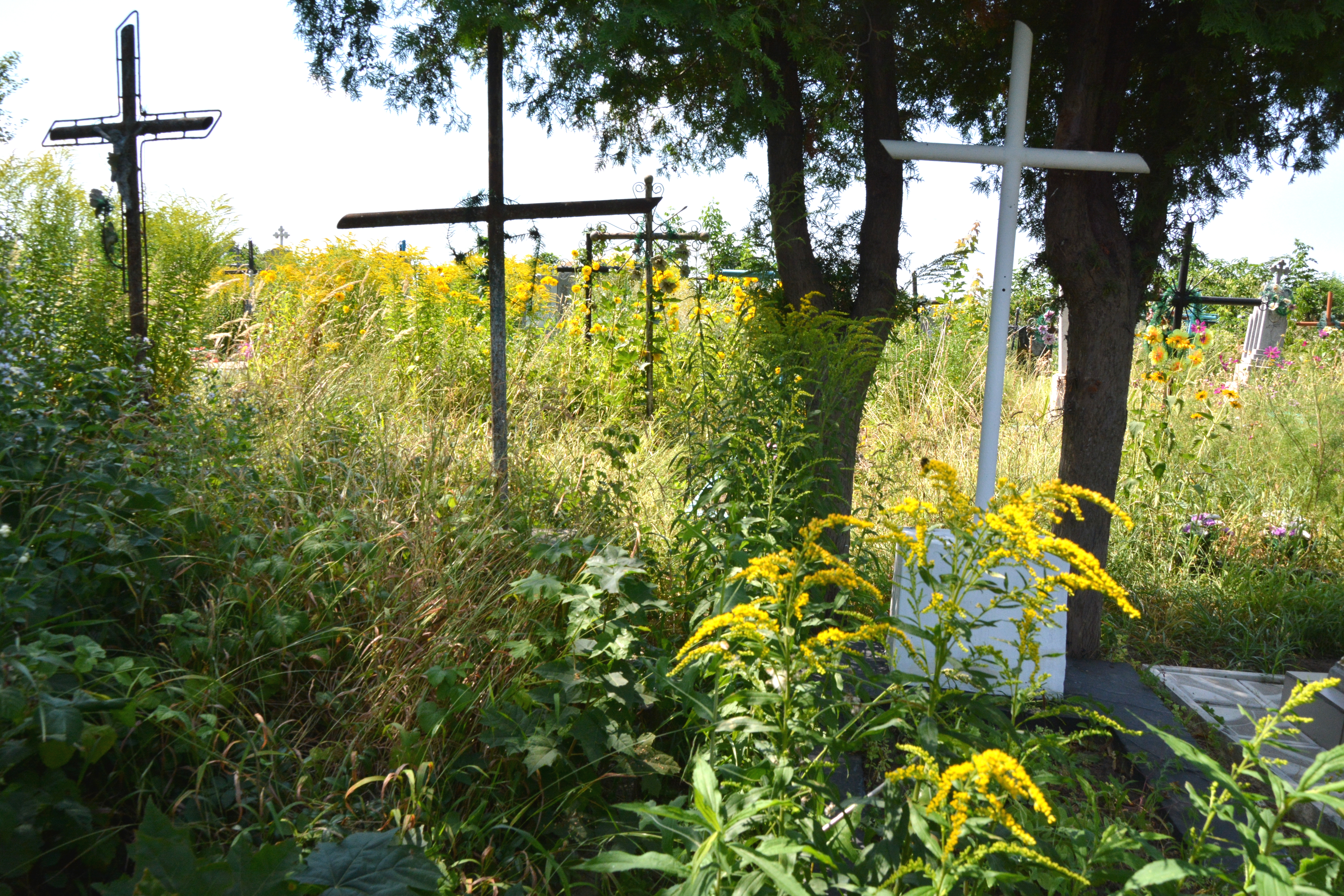
Graves of soldiers of Ukrainian People's Republic

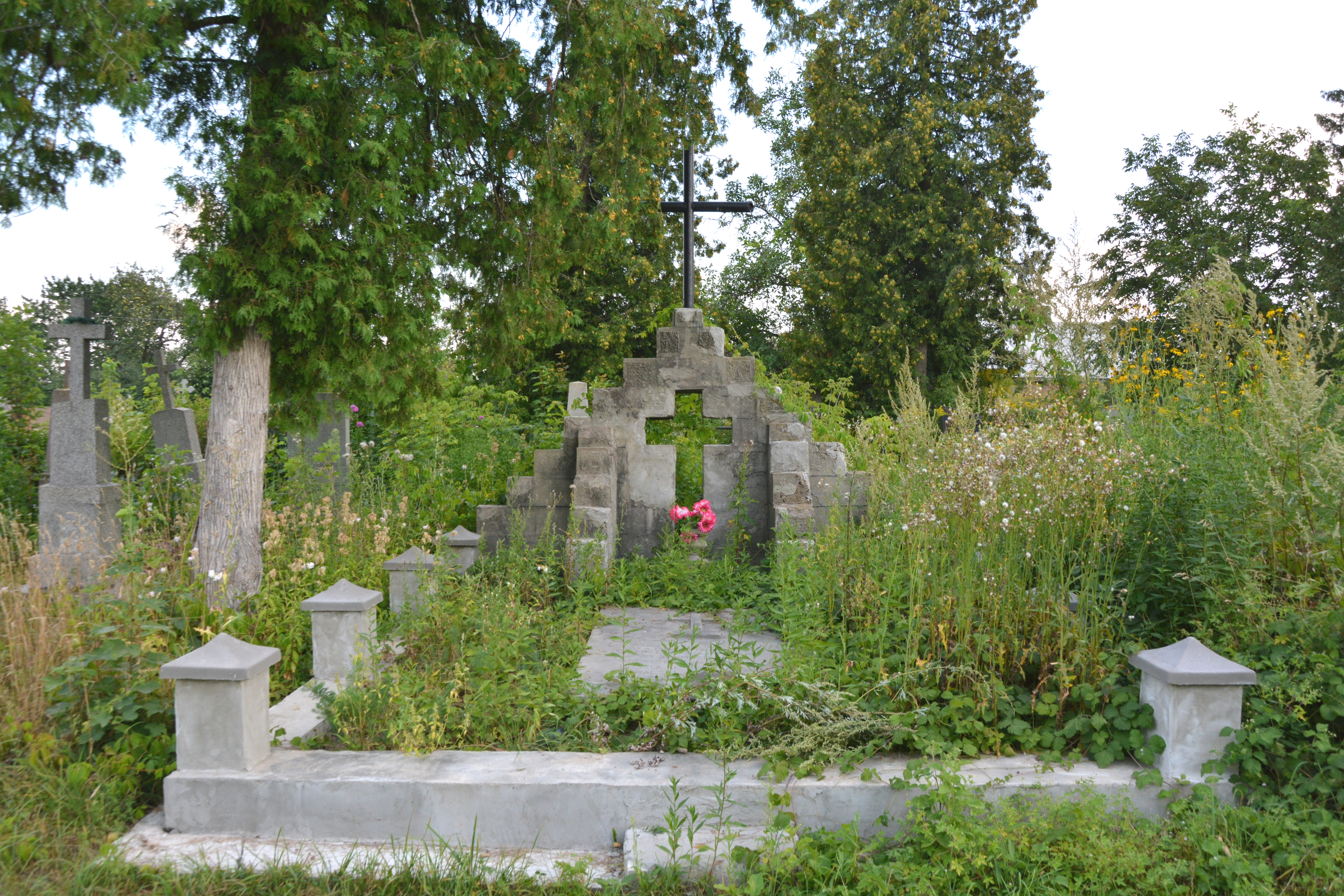
Memorial and common grave of Polish soldiers

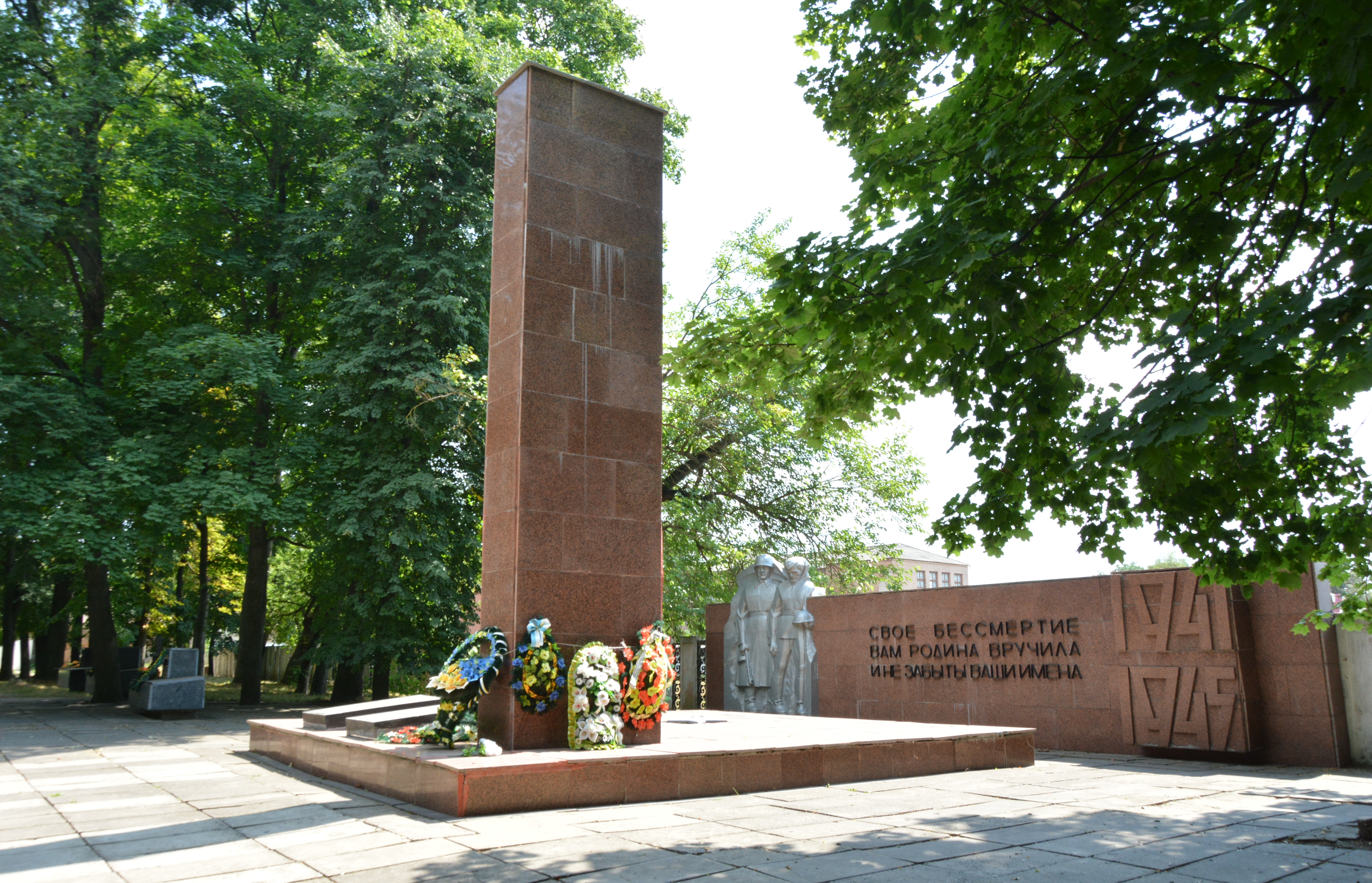
Memorial of World War II soldiers

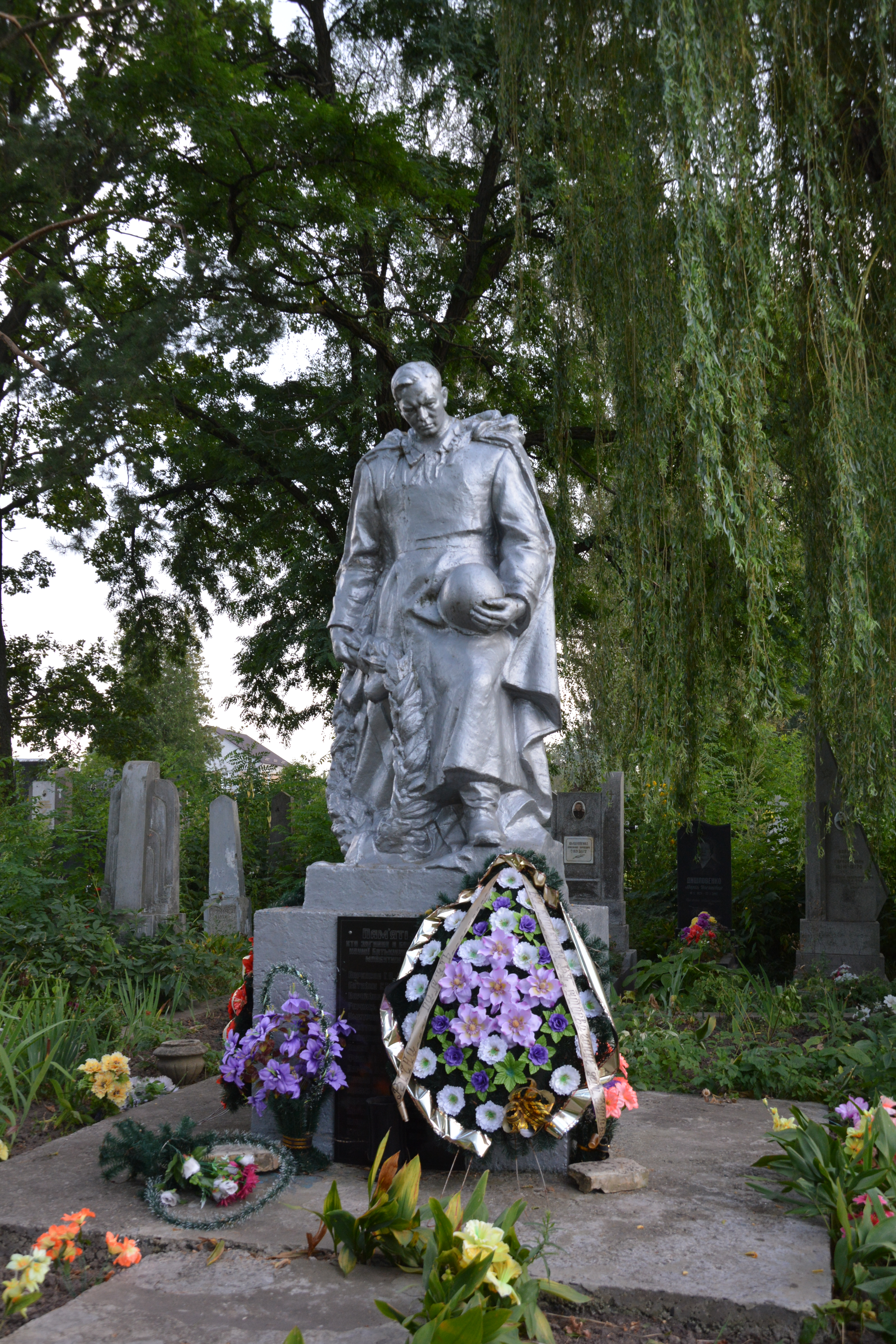
Common grave of World War II soldiers

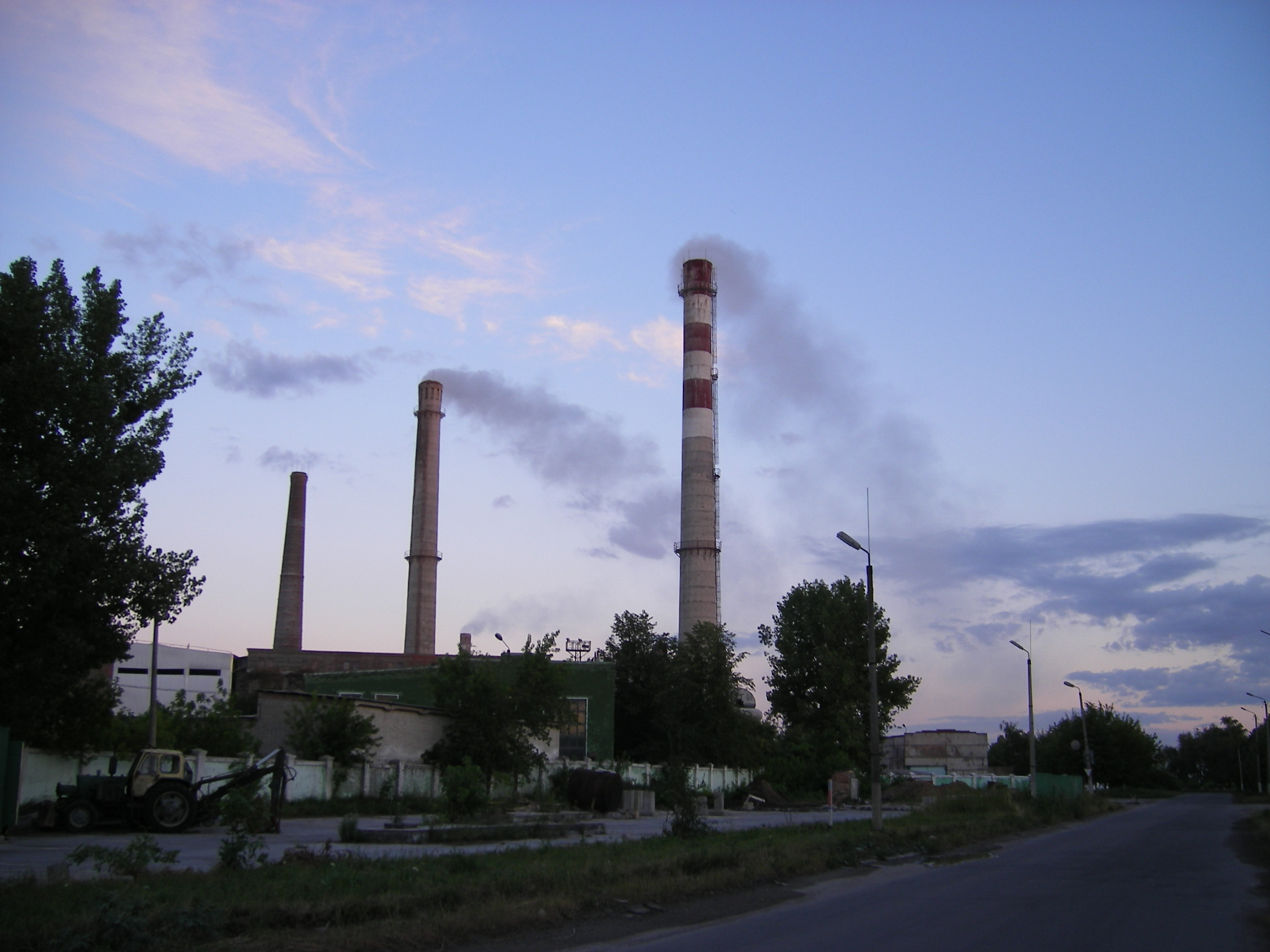
Zdolbuniv cement factory
