= Zdolbuniv Raion =

Former subdivision of Rivne Oblast, Ukraine

Zdolbuniv Raion Здолбунівський район
- Raion
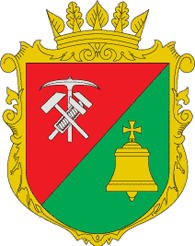
- Flag Coat of arms

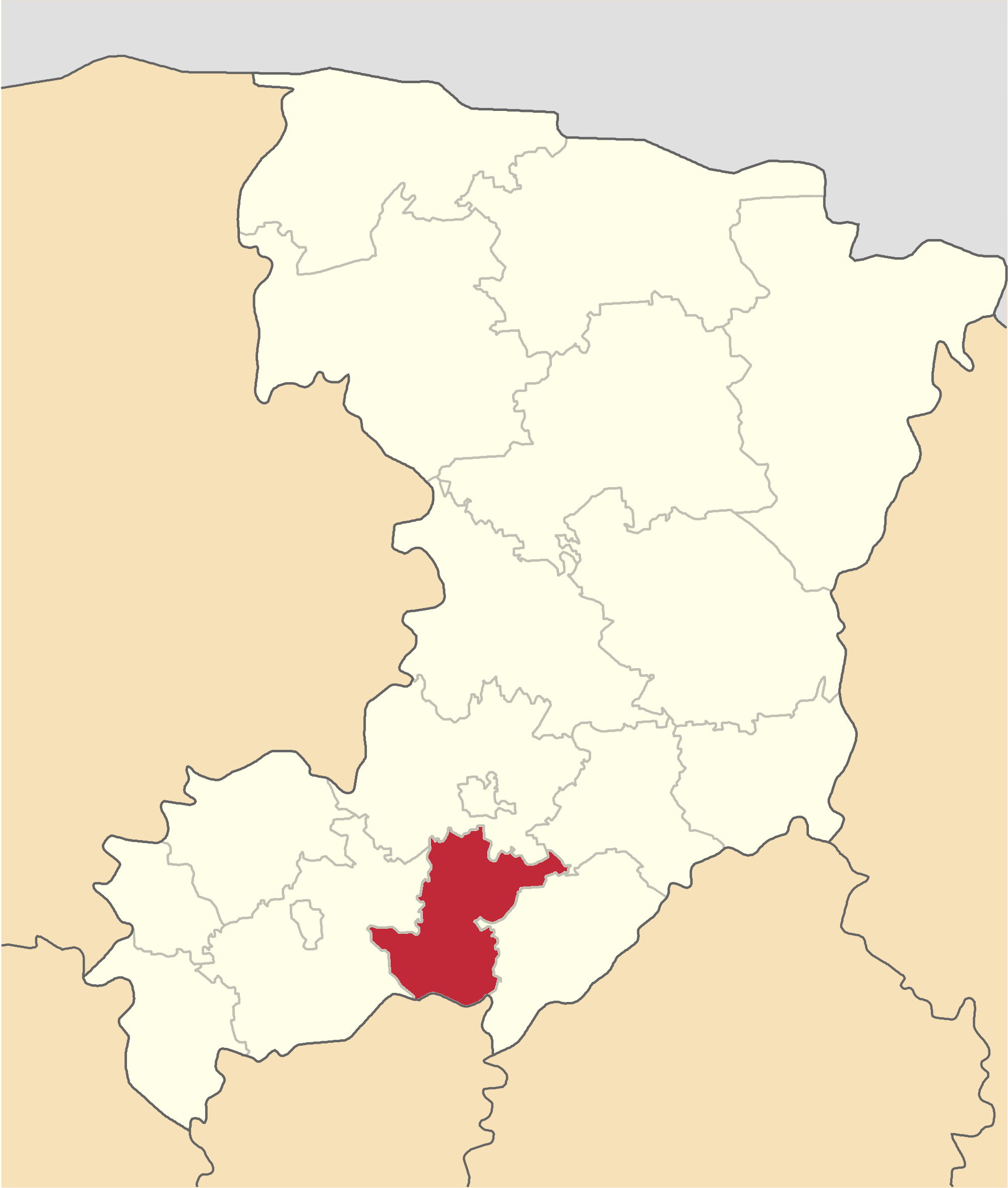
- Coordinates: 50°24′40″N 26°11′6″E
- Country: Ukraine
- Oblast: Rivne Oblast
- Established: 1939
- Disestablished: 18 July 2020
- Admin. center: Zdolbuniv
- Subdivisions: List: — city councils; — settlement councils; — rural councils; Number of localities: — cities; — urban-type settlements; 53 — villages; — rural settlements

Area
  - Total: 659 km^{2} (254 sq mi)

Population (2020)
  - Total: 56,109
  - Density: 85.1/km^{2} (221/sq mi)
- Time zone: UTC+02:00 (EET)
  - Summer (DST): UTC+03:00 (EEST)
- Area code: +380
- Website: http://zdolbun.rv.ua/index.php Zdolbuniv Raion

Zdolbuniv Raion (Ukrainian: Здолбунівський район) was a raion in Rivne Oblast in western Ukraine. Its administrative center was the town of Zdolbuniv. The raion was abolished and its territory was merged into Rivne Raion on 18 July 2020 as part of the administrative reform of Ukraine, which reduced the number of raions of Rivne Oblast to four. The last estimate of the raion population was 56,109 (2020 est.)

== Notable people ==
- Serhiy Dolhanskyi
- Vladimír Syrovátka
- Yurii Lavreniuk

== See also ==
- Subdivisions of Ukraine
- Battle of Gurby
