= Battle of Porta =

Part of the Greek Resistance during World War II

Coordinates: 39°28′N 21°37′E

Date	8–9 June 1943
Location	Porta–Mouzaki area, Italian-occupied Greece
Result	Royal Italian Army victory

Belligerents
Greek People's Liberation Army (ELAS)	Royal Italian Army

Commanders and leaders
Georgios Zarogiannis; Dimitris Tasos; Thanasis Koufodimos	Giuseppe Berti

Units involved
Pelion and Kissavos sub-commands Reserve ELAS forces Agrafa sub-command as reinforcements and reserves	6th Lancieri di Aosta Cav. Reg. (two battalions); 24th Pinerolo Inf. Div. (four battalions); Two Aromanian legionary companies

Strength
200–253 partisans	3,000–4,000 men (1st day), rising to c. 5,500 (2nd day); 4 bomber & 1 recon. aircraft

Casualties and losses
3 wounded	3 Italian soldiers and 5 Legionaries killed
- Location within Greece

The Battle of Porta (Greek: Μάχη της Πόρτας) was fought on 8–9 June 1943 at the Porta and Mouzaki passes in western Thessaly, between the partisans of the Greek People's Liberation Army (ELAS) and the Royal Italian Army, during the Axis occupation of Greece.

In spring 1943, a wave of successes demonstrated the rise of the Greek Resistance against the Axis powers, particularly the Italians; large areas of the mountainous interior of the country were effectively liberated. In response, the Italian 11th Army planned a large-scale anti-partisan operation for June. Warned of Italian intentions, ELAS General Headquarters withdrew its dispersed detachments to the central Pindus massif.

In Thessaly the forces withdrawn from the Mount Pelion and Mount Kissavos areas were detailed to watch the Porta and Mouzaki passes, covering the withdrawal of the rest of the Thessalian partisans. Contrary to orders from ELAS GHQ to only engage in disruptive hit-and-run attacks against the Italian army, the commanders of these two detachments, numbering around 250 men with mostly light weaponry and scarce ammunition, decided to hold the passes against the expected Italian attack. Over two weeks, field works were erected in front of the passes and outposts established in the villages. The Italians moved against the Greek positions on 8 June, with around 4,000 men, both infantry and cavalry, from the 24th Pinerolo Infantry Division, with artillery and aviation support.

Facing far superior numbers and lacking sufficient ammunition, the partisans were able to hold back the Italians at Porta on the first day, but at Mouzaki, the Italians forced them back and occupied the village. After reinforcements were brought in during the night, the Italians managed to advance on both flanks on 9 June, threatening to encircle the partisan position at Porta. The ELAS partisans withdrew to the mountains, but their actions had been successful in that the Italians, having suffered significant casualties, broke off their planned anti-partisan sweeps in the mountainous interior without continuing their advance.

== Background ==
On 6 April 1941, following a botched Italian invasion in October 1940, Nazi Germany invaded Greece through Bulgaria and Yugoslavia. The Greek capital Athens fell on 27 April, and by June, after the capture of Crete, all of Greece was under Axis occupation. Most of the country was left to the Italian forces, while Bulgaria annexed northeastern Greece and German troops occupied the strategically most important areas. A collaborationist government was installed, but its legitimacy among the Greek people was minimal, and its control over the country compromised by the patchwork of different occupation regimes Greece was divided into. As early as the autumn 1941, the first stirrings of a resistance movement were registered, with attacks on isolated Gendarmerie stations in Macedonia in northern Greece. The establishment of large-scale resistance organizations in 1942, most notably the communist-dominated National Liberation Front (EAM) and its military wing, the Greek People's Liberation Army (ELAS) began to challenge not only the collaborationist government's organs, but also the Italian occupation troops.

The winter and early spring of 1943 saw a series of resistance successes against the Italians in the mountainous areas of mainland Greece, with battlefield victories such as at Fardykambos, or the liberation of towns like Karditsa (12 March), Grevena (24 March), and Metsovo (22 April). By 16 April an Italian report noted that "control throughout the north-east, centre and south-west of Greece remains very precarious, not to say nonexistent". As a result, the high command of the Italian army in Greece, the 11th Army in Athens, decided to mount a large-scale and concerted anti-partisan effort, aimed at hemming in the partisan forces in the Pindus mountain massif, and then launching coordinated and concentric attacks in Thessaly, Central Greece, and Epirus to clear the area. The operation would begin after 20 May, the deadline set by the new collaborationist government under Ioannis Rallis for partisans to surrender in exchange for a full amnesty.

Consequently, the ELAS Central Committee issued orders to its regional headquarters to prepare for the attack, gathering the bulk of its forces in the Pindus massif, and relocating itself there, while leaving behind rear guards to obstruct the Italians. (Note: This decision, or rather the manner of its implementation in Thessaly and Macedonia, where the partisan groups were withdrawn entirely from large areas, was a result of a mix of caution and inexperience of the ELAS cadres, and of confusion in the chain of command between EAM and ELAS hierarchies, and came under heavy criticism: not only did it force the partisans to break off contact with the occupying forces, but it also exposed the civilian population to reprisals, and allowed rival groups to be established in the areas vacated by ELAS. Some ELAS members in their post-war memoirs even attributed this to deliberate misinformation by the British Intelligence Service, aimed at allowing the rival EDES group, to which the British were more favourably disposed, to expand in the areas vacated by ELAS.) Central Committee member Kostas Karagiorgis informed the Thessaly Headquarters of ELAS of these decisions when it met at Porta on 17 May. Thus the partisan groups of western and eastern Thessaly—the Agrafa sub-command (Ὑπαρχηγείον Ἀγράφων), the Koziakas sub-command (Ὑπαρχηγείον Κόζιακα), the Kissavos–Mavrovouni sub-command (Ὑπαρχηγείον Κισσάβου-Μαυροβουνίου) and Pelion–Karantaou sub-command (Ὑπαρχηγείον Πηλίου-Καραντάου)—were ordered to move towards the area of Mount Smolikas, while leaving behind some forces to harass the Italians, and occupying some strategic passes, i.e., the Porta–Mouzaki pass and the Kalambaka–Diava pass. After the Italian operation began on 22 May, the eastern Thessalian forces—the Kissavos and Pelion sub-commands—were forced to cross the Thessalian plain in a three-day operation, moving only under cover of darkness.

== Battlefield and opposing forces ==
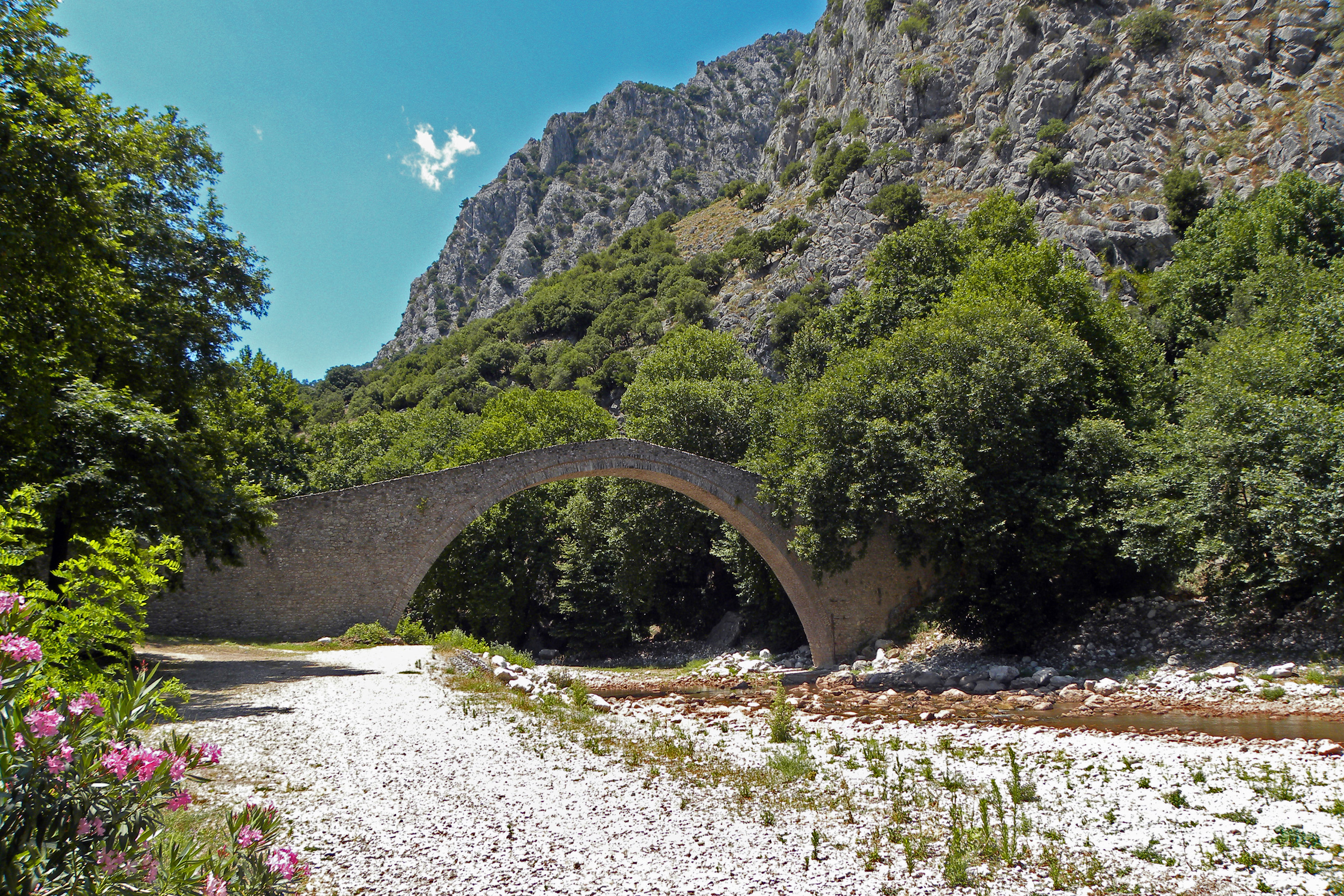
The Portaikos river with the Ottoman-era footbridge

The Porta Pass is formed by the Portaikos river as it descends from the Pindos mountains to the Thessalian plain. The village of Porta lies exactly at the entrance of the pass. In the 1940s, a narrow car road leading from Trikala to Pertouli passed near the village and crossed the river on a concrete bridge. The northern side of the pass, towards Koziakas, is nearly inaccessible except for narrow footpaths, but the southern side towards Agrafa is easier to traverse. The rear of the Porta defensive position could be attacked via the car road passing through the gap at Mouzaki allowed easy access to the village of Vatsounia. As a result, any defender of the Porta Pass against an opponent coming from the plain was also obliged to keep the Mouzaki–Porti area also under control to avoid being flanked.

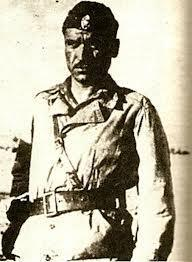
Dimitris Tasos (alias Mimis Boukouvalas), one of the ELAS commanders at Porta

The defence of the pass was undertaken by the eastern Thessalian sub-commands of Pelion and Kissavos, which were closest to the area. The Koziakas sub-command was ordered to occupy the Kalambaka–Diava pass, while a detachment sent to the Agrafa area for procuring supplies was ordered to remain there and carry out harassing attacks. The ELAS forces deployed in the Porta–Mouzaki numbered in total 235 partisans, (Note: In his memoirs, Boukouvalas claims a total force of only 140 men, reinforced during the battle with 60 more.) aided by four groups of Reserve ELAS fighters from the villages of Dousikos, Porta, Beletsi, and Mouzaki, but only the Dousikos group actually fought in the battle, as the others were used as covering forces and messengers. The two detachments of the Kissavos sub-command, reinforced by a squad from the Agrafa sub-command—8 squads in total—held the Porta straits, while the Pelion sub-command, likewise reinforced with a squad from Agrafa—6 squads in total—held the passes at Mouzaki.

Typical for Greek resistance fighters during this time, their weaponry was a medley of different origins: Greek Mannlicher-Schönauer rifles, old French Lebel and even more antiquated Gras rifles, as well as rifles of Bulgarian, German and British provenance. Each squad had one sub-machine gun and one light machine gun, again of different types, from the World War I-vintage French Chauchat used by the Greek army, to captured Italian Breda 30s and British-supplied Brens. The only heavier armament was two Hotchkiss machine guns and an Italian mortar lacking aiming sights. One machine gun and the mortar were deployed at Porta, and the other machine gun at Mouzaki. The partisans were also short of ammunition; some fighters had as few as 15 bullets for their rifles; only 36 shells were available for the mortar, of which six misfired and had to be repaired during the battle; the light machine guns only had about 300 bullets, sufficient for a brief firefight at most; there was no ammunition for one of the machine guns, so the partisans' arms workshop shortened 3,500 German rounds by 2 millimetres (0.079 in) to be fireable by the machine gun.

The commanders at Porta, as well as of the overall force, were Cavalry Captain Georgios Zarogiannis (nom de guerre "Kavallaris", 'horseman'), a veteran of the Greco-Italian War and head of the Kissavos sub-command, and Dimitris Tasos, better known by his alias of "Mimis Boukouvalas". During the course of the battle, a former General Staff colonel, Dimitrios Petroulakis, served in an advisory capacity; after the battle, despite being a committed royalist, he joined the ELAS General Headquarters as chief of staff. According to Boukouvalas' memoirs, given the small force at their disposal, the Thessaly Headquarters initially insisted that they only harass the Italians, but he and Zarogiannis insisted on standing and fighting at Porta as long as possible. To that end, a fortnight before the battle they began preparing extensive fieldworks covering a front of some 4 kilometres (2.5 mi), running from north of Dousikos to Mouzaki. Telephone lines were laid to outposts in Dousikos, Mouzaki, and to Tyrna and Pertouli to their rear. Advanced detachments and horse patrols were sent out to gather supplies and reconnoitre the plain as close to Trikala as possible, and a telephone line was laid to the villages of Mikri Pouliana and Beletsi to warn of the approach of Italian forces. Headquarters reluctantly conceded them freedom of action, and Boukouvalas and Zarogiannis continued preparing their defences in the area. Since no timely reinforcements could be expected, the plan was to delay the Italian advance for as long as possible. The forces covering the Mouzaki area were instructed, if pressed hard, to begin an orderly retreat by pivoting towards the right, while keeping their left anchored to maintain contact with the Porta position.

In early June 1943, the Italians held Trikala with a cavalry and an infantry regiment, with a couple of tanks, an artillery battalion, engineers and support services, with a further cavalry regiment at Simikli (now Polyneri). The morale of the Italian forces was low, but its command was aware, from spies and reconnaissance flights, that ELAS had left some small forces in the Porta–Mouzaki area and had begun erecting fieldworks there. In preparation for the anti-partisan sweeps, reinforcements were brought up from Larissa, including men of the so-called 'Roman Legion', an Aromanian ('Vlach') secessionist group sponsored by the Italians. Pack animals were requisitioned from the neighbouring settlements in preparation for an anti-partisan sweep. The forces amassed for the operation against Porta numbered two full infantry battalions from the Pinerolo Infantry Division, (Note: According to the contemporary reports of the 11th Army, the Pinerolo division was classed as "incomplete" in terms of effectiveness in spring 1943, having only about 60% of the automobiles and pack animals on its table of organization and equipment, and 85% of personnel.) two battalions from the—partly motorized—Lancieri di Aosta cavalry regiment at Trikala, a field battery, two companies of Aromanian separatists, four bomber aircraft and one reconnaissance aircraft.

== The battle ==
=== 8 June ===
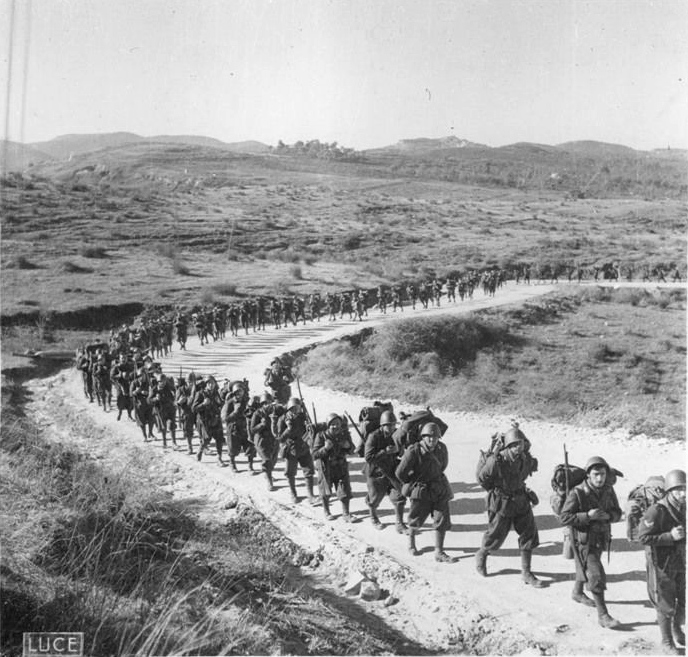
Italian infantry marching

The Italians' plans became apparent on the night of 7 June, when their force began moving by road from Trikala to the village of Gortzi on the road to Petra. At about 01:00 on 8 June, the telephone operator from Poliana informed ELAS command of the Italian movement, and the partisans were alerted to occupy their positions. The Italians arrived at Beletsi at 04:30. In order to increase the psychological impact on the partisans, the Italian commander placed his cavalry in front, advancing at the double.

At 05:30, men of an advanced detachment from Pelion, situated on the heights above Beletsi, opened fire on the advancing Italians, before retiring higher up the mountain side. Shortly after, Italian cavalry and motorcycle troops made contact with the defensive position of the Kissavos men at Petra. As Italian infantry followed up their advance guards, fighting developed both at Petra and at Mouzaki. Both sides made use of their heavy equipment, while the Italian aircraft also began attacks. The Greeks' mortar proved inaccurate, due both to the lack of sights and being unable to train because of the lack of ammunition.

On the Porta sector, the Italians withdrew around noon, leaving only a detachment of 40 men to watch the entrance in a guardpost outside Porta. Shortly afterwards a group of five partisans led by "Peronosporos" ('mildew') managed to crawl up to them without being seen, surprise the garrison, and force them to withdraw completely. At about the same time, Lieutenant Georgios Nikitas took over the command of the partisan mortar and relocated it, greatly improving the accuracy and effect of its fire, which helped to scatter the Italian cavalry massing for an attack outside Beletsi in the afternoon. Repeated cavalry attacks between Porta and Dousikos were repelled by partisan fire before they came near the Greek positions. These were the last Italian attempts against Porta for that day.

The Italians pressed their main attack in the direction of Mouzaki, and by noon had made some small progress. The commander of the Greek Pelion sub-command, Thanasis Koufodimos ("Petros Pilioritis") was wounded by a mortar fragment at c. 12:30, followed by another partisan, Dervisis. Despite his wound, Koufodimos remained in his post directing the battle until his replacement, Ioannis Katsantonis, arrived in the afternoon. Around noon, the Italians occupied the village of Mouzaki, which they plundered and torched. To avoid being surrounded and outnumbered, the Pelion squads began withdrawing to the ridge between Beletsi and Mouzaki and the village of Porti. In the evening, the Italians broke off their advance and withdrew to Beletsi and Mouzaki.

=== 9 June ===
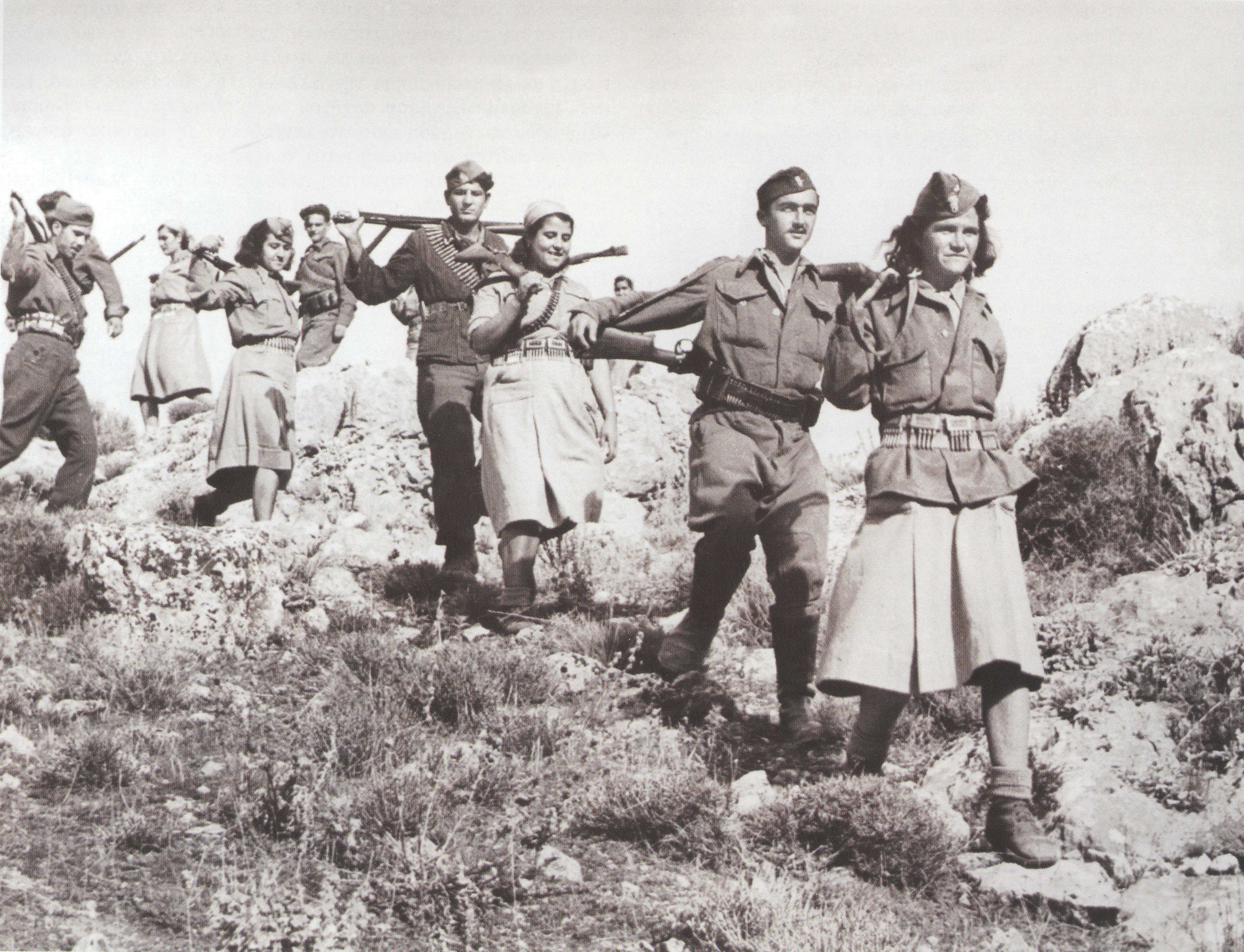
ELAS partisans

During the night Italian vehicles brought up more troops, including the cavalry regiment at Simikli and one infantry battalion each from Larissa and Volos, bringing the total force to 5,500 men, according to the testimony of Italian prisoners taken by the partisans. These reinforcements arrived during the morning. The partisans' shortage of ammunition, bad the day before, was now worse. According to Boukouvalas, messages were sent to the village of Prodromos, where the nearest ELAS force under the teacher Lepouchis was quartered. They requested he take his men to Lesiana, to the right and rear of the Italians, and attack them from there. However, Lepouchis put the proposal to a vote among his men, who rejected it as most expected that the Porta position could not be held. The partisans did receive a reinforcement of 60 men from Pertouli during the night, who took position on the eastern flank of the Porta position.

At dawn, the Italians renewed their assault with artillery and air support. Their attack was aimed not only to the south against Mouzaki as on the previous day, but also to the north against Mount Koziakas, in a pincer movement against the partisan positions. The first assault was thrown back; Boukouvalas reported that the partisans could see the Italian commanding general landing in his liaison plane to bolster his men's morale. The Italians managed to reach Porti around noon and torch it, but their subsequent attempts to push forward into the southern flank of the Petra position were repelled. The role of the Hotchkiss machine gun, emplaced outside Porti and manned by "Flogas" ('flame'), proved crucial as its fire pinned down the Italian troops for the rest of the day.

On the northern flank, however, the Italians had more success: cavalry squadrons reconnoitred the approaches to Mount Koziakas, finding that the partisans held only the area up to the villages of Dousikos and Lepenitsa. In the afternoon, two battalions launched an attack on the northern flank of the Porta position, captured the villages of Gorgyri and Xylopariko, and pushed on to the heights of Lepenitsa, from where the Italians and their Legionary auxiliaries could flank the ELAS forces at Dousikos; the ELAS forces withdrew higher up the mountain. After the squad defending the area ran out of ammunition, the Italians entered the village of Dousikos in the afternoon and set it on fire, threatening the defenders of Petra, who were also running low on ammunition, with only 2 to 5 rounds per rifle and no mortar shells. At the same time, on the southern flank the Italians applied renewed pressure on the Sklataina–Vatsinia axis, threatening to outflank the Porta position.

Consequently the ELAS commanders ordered a withdrawal, which began at 17:00, in the direction of Tyrna. At 17:30 they blew up the road bridge over the Portaikos river to impede an Italian advance. The withdrawal was so fast that the Italians, busy torching the village of Porta, lost contact with the partisans. Once the Porta troops were safely withdrawn and a new defensive position established at Dramizi, the Mouzaki position was evacuated under cover of night.

== Aftermath ==
According to EAM/ELAS members, the c. 250 partisans, fighting for two days against a vastly superior force, suffered only three wounded. The official number of Italian casualties recorded by the Hellenic Army History Directorate was three Italian soldiers and five Legionaries killed. Other sources give much larger figures: about 300 dead and wounded, including a major; the military commander of ELAS, Stefanos Sarafis, who was nearby at Tzourtza, claimed "almost 500" Italian dead and wounded, as well as the loss of many horses and an aircraft, although later in his memoirs he raised the number of Italian casualties to "approximately 700". The following day, the Italians torched the villages of Porta, Vatsinia, Chania, and Ropotania. (Note: Following the Italian surrender, the Italian forces in Thessaly went over to ELAS, and partisans captured the military archives of the Aosta regiment. Based on these documents, they held its commander, Colonel Berti, as prisoner with the intention of trying him for war crimes, but he was released on the intervention of the British military mission.) Estimating the partisan forces present at many times their actual number, they made no attempt to enter the mountainous regions, and after gathering their dead returned to Trikala two days later. Only eight days later did 1,500 men from Trikala move against the Agrafa area, setting fire to the villages of Vounesi, Kanalia, and Mesenikolas. Near Vounesi they were confronted by some 30 partisans of the Agrafa sub-command. The partisans withdrew higher up the mountain after a first firefight; the Italians, suspicious of a larger ambush, broke off the operation and returned to their bases.

For ELAS, the battle of Porta was of particular importance as the first time it confronted the Italians as a regular army in a "more or less full-scale defensive action", as Sarafis describes it, rather than hit-and-run ambushes. This marked the transformation and maturation of ELAS from a guerrilla force into "disciplined troops who knew how to fight", a fact readily recognized by the Italians themselves: the Italian commandant at Trikala remarked as much to the local Greek prefect, reprimanding him for not providing accurate information about the partisans. From then until the Italian armistice in September 1943, the Italian garrisons in Thessaly remained confined to the cities and gave up any further attempt at confronting the partisans. In the weeks after the armistice, the Italian forces in Thessaly began negotiating their going over to the partisans. Initially it was agreed that the Italian formations, the Pinerolo division and the Aosta cavalry regiment, would remain intact and retain their armament to fight against the Germans, but on 15 October the 1st ELAS Division forcibly disarmed them, encountering only brief resistance from the Aosta cavalry regiment and isolated garrisons in the area of Porta.

== Sources ==
- Ballis, Dimitrios E. (1981). Ο ΕΛΑΣ στη Θεσσαλία [ELAS in Thessaly] (in Greek). Athens: Synchroni Epochi.
- Bregantin, Lisa (2010). L'occupazione dimenticata. Gli italiani in Grecia 1941-1943 [The Forgotten Occupation. The Italians in Greece 1941–1943] (PhD) (in Italian). Università Ca’ Foscari di Venezia. Archived from the original on 2019-01-17.
- Eudes, Dominique (1973). The Kapetanios: Partisans and Civil War in Greece, 1943-1949. Translated by John Howe. New York and London: Monthly Review Press. ISBN 978-0-85345-275-1.
- Grigoriadis, Solon (1982). Συνοπτική Ιστορία της Εθνικής Αντίστασης, 1941-1944 [Concise History of the National Resistance, 1941-1944] (in Greek). Athens: Kapopoulos. OCLC 165816421.
- Hatzis, Thanasis (1983). Η νικηφόρα επανάσταση που χάθηκε [The victorious revolution that was lost] (in Greek). Vol. II. Athens: Dorikos.
- Hellenic Army History Directorate (1998). Αρχεία Εθνικής Αντίστασης, 1941-1944. Τόμος 3ος "Αντάρτικη Οργάνωση ΕΛΑΣ" [National Resistance Archives, 1941-1944. 3rd Volume "ELAS Partisan Organization"]. Athens: Hellenic Army History Directorate. ISBN 960-7897-31-5.
- Mazower, Mark (1993). Inside Hitler's Greece: The Experience of Occupation, 1941–44. New Haven and London: Yale University Press. ISBN 0-300-06552-3.
- Sarafis, Stefanos (1980). ELAS: Greek Resistance Army. Translated by Sylvia Moody. London: Merlin Press. ISBN 9780850362442.
- Sevastakis, Alexis (1978). Καπετάν Μπουκουβάλας: Το αντάρτικο ιππικό της Θεσσαλίας [Kapetan Boukouvalas: The partisan cavalry of Thessaly] (in Greek). Athens: Diogenis.
