= Battle of Leivadi =

The Battle of Leivadi (Greek: Μάχη του Λειβαδιού) was a series of clashes fought on 15–18 November 1942 between guerrillas of the Greek People's Liberation Army (ELAS), under Nikos Xynos, and the local Royal Italian Army garrison, in and around the village of Leivadi, in Thessaly.

The battle began when an Italian column raided the village of Leivadi aiming to gather the local potato harvest for the Italian occupation troops. The local ELAS group, under Nikos Xynos, attacked the Italians, recovering the booty and taking 17 prisoners. This caused the reaction of the Italian garrison at nearby Elassona, which sent two companies in the direction of Leivadi. The Italians entered the village, but were faced not only with Xynos' group, but all guerrilla forces of the region, as well as local inhabitants who took up arms, in all some 500 fighters. As a result, a series of engagements followed over the following days as the Italians tried to withdraw, extending to an area 50 kilometres (31 mi) deep and 3 kilometres (1.9 mi) wide.

The Italians were pushed back to their base at Elassona, and while the military results were otherwise meagre, the Greek success put an end to Italian raids for supplies in the countryside.

== Sources ==
- Grigoriadis, Solon (1982). Συνοπτική Ιστορία της Εθνικής Αντίστασης, 1941–1944 [Concise History of the National Resistance, 1941–1944] (in Greek). Athens: Kapopoulos. OCLC 165816421.
- Moutoulas, Pantelis (2006). Σύντομη Ιστορία της Κατοχής (1941–1944) [Short History of the Occupation (1941–1944)] (in Greek). Athens: Diogenis. ISBN 960-7153-73-1.
