= Battle of Fardykambos =

1943 World War II battle in Italian-occupied Greece

Date	4–6 March 1943
Location	Siatista, Italian-occupied Greece 40°13′59″N 21°32′50″E
Result	Greek Resistance victory, capture of the garrison of Grevena

Belligerents
ELAS; Individual members of PAO; Armed residents of Siatista	Royal Italian Army

Commanders and leaders
Dimitrios Zygouras (ELAS); Vasilis Ganatsios (ELAS); Ioannis Kontonasios (PAO)	Perrone Pasconelli (POW)

Casualties and losses
3 partisans, 1 civilian killed 10 partisans, 3 civilians wounded	96 dead, 79 wounded 565 or 553 POWs
- Location within Greece

The Battle of Fardykambos (Greek: Μάχη του Φαρδύκαμπου), also known as the Battle of Bougazi (Μάχη στο Μπουγάζι), was fought between the National Liberation Front (EAM-ELAS) of the Greek Resistance against the Italian troops during the Axis Occupation of Greece. The battle was notable for the large-scale and spontaneous participation of the local populace, and of officers from other groups and organizations, including right-wing rivals to ELAS.

The three-day battle began with the successful ambush of an Italian transport column on 4 March 1943. The Italian battalion garrisoning the nearby town of Grevena came to the column's rescue, but was halted before the town of Siatista by Greek partisan forces. The Greek forces continued to swell as reserve officers and ordinary civilians flocked as volunteers to the sound of battle, reaching a force of some 2,000 men. By nightfall on 5 March, the Italian battalion had been surrounded by the Greeks, and after incessant harassment and attacks over the following day, was forced to surrender on the night of 6/7 March. Many weapons and supplies, including field artillery, were acquired by the Greeks, and over 550 Italian troops became prisoners of war. The battle led to the liberation of Grevena from Italian occupation a few weeks later, and was a major sign of the growth of the Greek partisan movement, and the collapse of Italian rule over rural Greece.

== Background ==
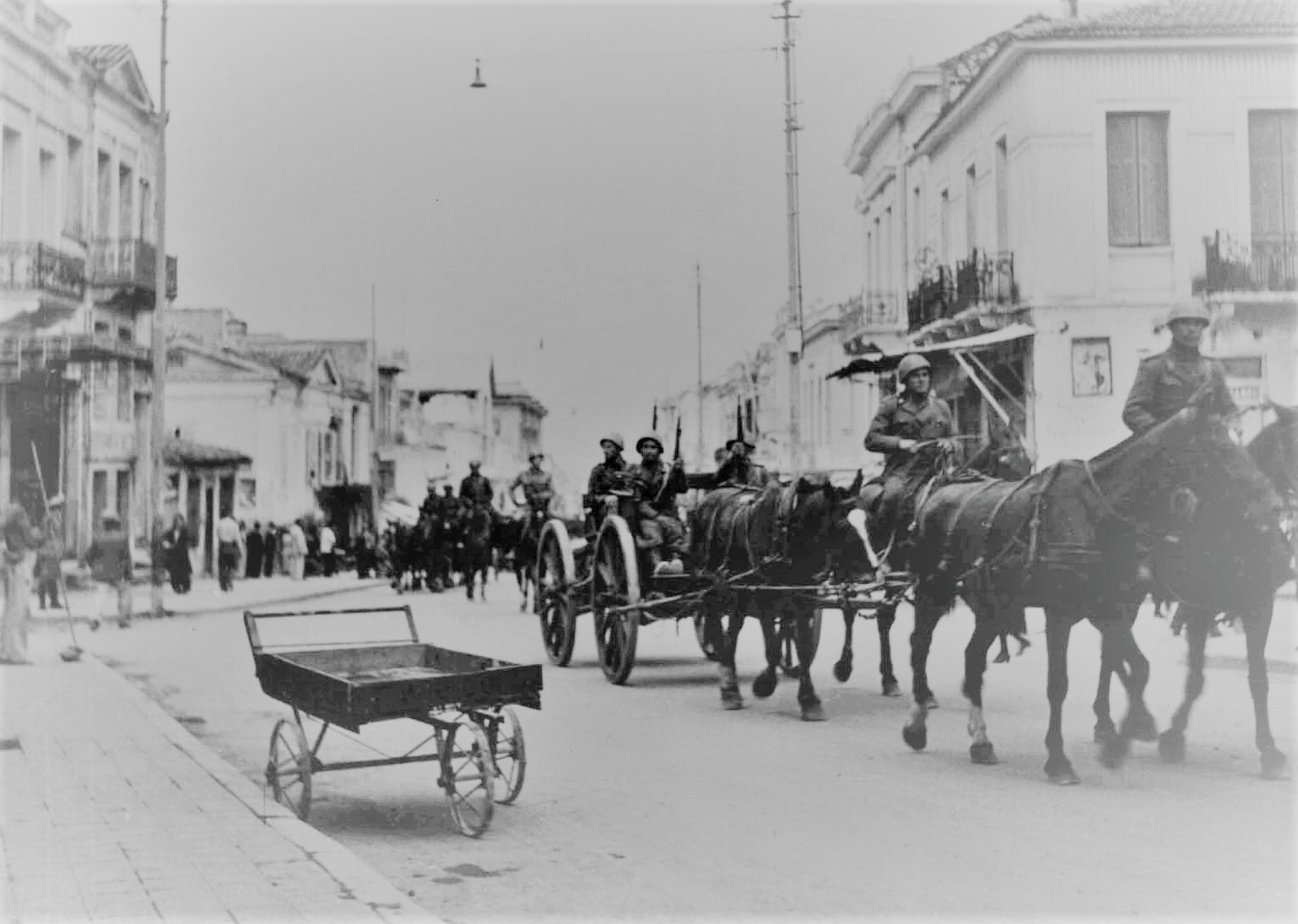
Italian troops entering Patras in May 1941

On 6 April 1941, following a botched Italian invasion in October 1940, Nazi Germany invaded Greece through Bulgaria and Yugoslavia. The Greek capital Athens fell on 27 April, and by June, after the capture of Crete, all of Greece was under Axis occupation. Most of the country was left to the Italian forces, while Bulgaria annexed northeastern Greece and German troops occupied the strategically most important areas. A collaborationist government was installed, but its authority with the Greek people was minimal, and its control over the country compromised by the occupation authorities, who created a patchwork of separate jurisdictions. As early as the autumn 1941, the first stirrings of a resistance movement were registered, with attacks on isolated Gendarmerie stations in Macedonia in northern Greece. The establishment of large-scale resistance organizations, most notably the communist-dominated National Liberation Front (EAM) and its military wing, the Greek People's Liberation Army (ELAS), which proceeded apace in 1942, began to challenge not only the collaborationist government's organs, but also the Italian occupation troops.

On 29 January 1943, ELAS partisans entered the Macedonian town of Siatista, attacked the local Gendarmerie station and disbanded it. Lieutenant Thomas Venetsanopoulos and ten more gendarmes even joined the ELAS forces. Siatista thus became the first town in occupied Greece to be liberated. A few days later, ELAS forces clashed with an Italian Army company near the village of Snichovo (modern Despotis). As a result, the Italians engaged in reprisals against the civilian population: in the provincial capital of Grevena, the Italian battalion garrisoned there executed seven civilians, while the Lancieri di Aosta cavalry regiment burned villages in the area of the Kamvounia mountains.

== Battle ==
The battle comprised two different but connected engagements: an ambush on 4 March, at the pass of Vigla, against an Italian transport column, followed by the second and main battle at Fardykambos, on 5–6 March, against the Italian garrison of Grevena that set out to relieve the transport column.

=== 4 March ===
On 4 March, ELAS forces from Siatista, augmented with Reserve ELAS members from the surrounding villages, some 200–250 men in total, ambushed an Italian convoy heading for Grevena from Korçë via Florina and Kozani. The ambush took place in the narrow pass of Bougazi between the mountains of Sniatsiko and Bourino, at the location known as Vigla, some 3 km from Siatista itself. The partisans were armed with shotguns and antiquated Gras rifles, axes, and damascened knives, but were able to knock out the first and ninth lorries in their opening salvo, trapping the bulk of the convoy; only the tenth lorry, at the rear of the column, managed to turn around and escape. The battle lasted for three hours, and was ended when the partisans closed in for hand-to-hand combat, whereupon the Italians surrendered. Of the 180 Italians in the convoy, 15 lay dead and 34 were wounded, who were handed over to Red Cross representatives. The rest were taken prisoner. The partisans suffered only three lightly wounded. The lorries, five of which were in running order, contained large quantities of food, a mortar, a heavy and ten light machine guns, as well as rifles and ammunition were captured and carried off.

In the meantime, when the convoy became overdue in Grevena, the local commander, Perrone Pasconelli, sent a company in four lorries to look for it, but it was halted by hastily drawn together ELAS reserves, comprising mostly old men and very young boys, at the Aliakmon River bridge. As a result, early in the afternoon, the rest of the Grevena garrison set out, 600 men in total, leaving behind only a skeleton guard. The arrival of night forced the Italians to halt at the site of the earlier skirmish near the village of Agios Georgios, while ELAS mobilized every available man from Vogatsiko, Tsotyli, and Neapoli, and the local inhabitants of Siatista and the neighbouring villages flocked to assist them, raising their strength to some 600 men. Among the people flocking to the sound of the battle were also many regular and reserve officers who were not members of ELAS; some were even members of right-wing organizations such as EKA. Nevertheless, the ELAS command welcomed them and assigned them various commands. The same happened with nearby Gendarmerie units that flocked to the battle, including the entire Gendarmerie garrison of Servia, under its commander Charalambos Koutalakis, as well as the guard installed by the Germans at the Aliakmon bridge.

=== 5 March ===
On the morning of 5 March the Italians managed to cross the Aliakmon bridge and reach the defile where their supply convoy had been captured. Around noon, the Italians regrouped at a site near the crossing of the Kozani-Grevena-Kastoria road, where there were many cultivated fields and vines, known as Fardykambos. In the afternoon, the Italians attacked the partisan positions on then heights south of Siatista, using the three mountain cannons they had brought with them to great effect. Despite heavy resistance, the Italians advanced with determination, reaching the outskirts of the lower town of Siatista. At this point, the ELAS leadership decided to outflank the Italians, sending one group, under Tasianopoulos, Skotidas, and Foteinos, to attack them from the west, while 25 men from the village of Polylakkos, under Second Lieutenant Dimitrios Papagianopoulos, crossed the Aliakmon by swimming, and attacked the Italian battalion's command post. At the same time, the ELAS detachment from Grevena attacked the Italian battalion from the south, forcing it to fall back to Fardykambos. At one point, the partisans even came close to the Italian commander's tent, until nightfall forced an end to combat.

As the battle had reached a critical phase, the local EAM leadership called on the retired army officer, and member of the right-wing Panhellenic Liberation Organization (PAO), Major Ioannis Kontonasios, to take over the general command of the partisan forces. Kontonasios, with Captain Athanasios Dafnis as his staff officer, established his headquarters in the monastery of the village of Mikrokastro, and ordered the complete encirclement of the Italian column. Throughout the night, local people and fighters continued to flock to the battlefield; by the dawn of 6 March, the Greek forces surrounding the Italians numbered over 2,000 men.

=== 6 March ===
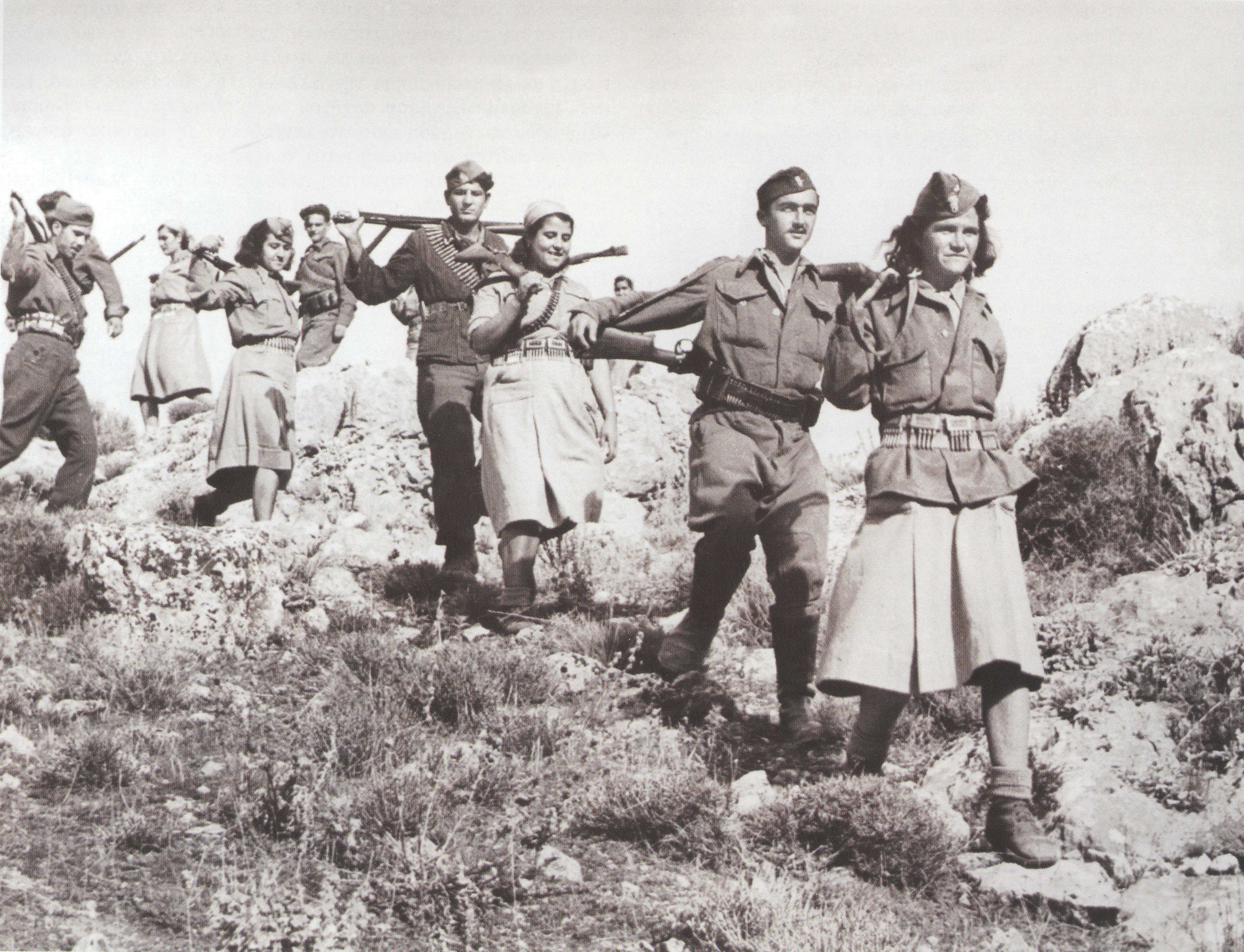
EAM-ELAS partisans

The next day, the local population continued arriving in droves to witness the battle and encourage their own. In the words of Dominic Eudes:

...long lines of peasants could be seen winding over the mountains towards the spot. Some of the hills were black with people; they were flooding in from all directions, from their land and their villages, spontaneously, unanimously. Some were totally unarmed, without knives or even stones; they were there simply because they had not been able to resist joining the procession. As far as they were concerned it was a rural demonstration, and they emitted ferocious yells which sowed panic in the enemy's ranks. Old Gras rifles banged away like mortars. Shouts rose from behind every rock. The Italians found it impossible to evaluate the forces ranged against them. By the end of the morning the sun was beating solidly down on the rocks, the blinding sun of the Greek spring. There was no water in the sector where the enemy had dug in.

Nevertheless, the Italians held out during the day, beating off two concerted attacks by the partisans. The Greek attacks were hampered by the presence of Italian aircraft, although many partisans resorted to the trick of laying their cloaks over rocks and letting the Italian pilots strafe them. Other Italian aircraft dropped supplies by parachute, but many landed in the hands of the partisans instead. Finally, under the pressure of the partisans, thirst, and hunger, towards the evening Major Pasconelli appeared before Reserve Lieutenant Dimitrios Zygouras (nom de guerre "Palaiologos"), and surrendered. His horse, riderless and in panic, galloped off in the direction of Grevena, where it arrived early on the next day, bringing to the remaining Italian soldiers there the news of the disaster.

The battle had lasted for 52 hours. According to the official communique issued by the local ELAS headquarters, the partisans took 17 officers and 432 other ranks prisoner, of whom 45 wounded; the partisans claimed 20 dead Italians. Three 75mm mountain guns with 300 shells, 3 motor vehicles, 57 mules and 3 chargers, 4 small mortars, 500 rifles, 30 pistols, 8 heavy machine guns, 32 submachine guns, all with ample ammunition, were captured. Greek casualties were 3 dead and 10 wounded among the guerrillas, and one dead and 3 wounded among the civilian population. Some 4,000 troops sent by the 36th Forlì Infantry Division in Larissa to assist, having arrived in Servia on the evening of 5 March, torched the city in retaliation.

The captives were led to Siatista, where the Italian Major was allowed to phone the Italian commander-in-chief in Greece, General Carlo Geloso, to report his surrender "to partisan forces superior to our own". At Palaiologos' insistence, the Major repeated his call to warn that the safety of the prisoners could not be guaranteed if any Italian airplane or military unit approached Siatista. Nevertheless, a few days later an Italian airplane appeared, and dropped a bomb which fell harmlessly outside the town. The Italians were eventually led to a prisoner of war camp in Pentalofos, where they remained for the next 18 months.

Total Italian casualties in the three-day battle are variously reported by Palaiologos as 95 dead and 644 prisoners (including 79 wounded), while other sources calculate the total number of prisoners at 553 (17 officers and 536 other ranks).

== Aftermath ==
The battle was "the most important battle of the later winter" in the rapidly developing Greek guerrilla movement. Two weeks later, on 21 March, another Italian battalion moved from Larissa to Grevena, clashing with partisans on the way but reaching its target, where it evacuated the remaining Italian garrison. Grevena was abandoned for good, and became one of the first towns of Axis-occupied Europe to be liberated. On 25 March, the anniversary of the proclamation of Greek independence, ELAS troops paraded through the city and were blessed by the city's bishop. The victory also greatly increased morale in the region and the profile of ELAS—which also for the first time acquired artillery. In the following months, the effective strength of ELAS in western Macedonia rose from about 50 to 2,000 men.

The Battle of Fardykambos was part of a general flowering of the Greek armed resistance movement, and the concurrent retrenchment of the Italian occupying forces: already on 12 March the Italians evacuated Karditsa and abandoned it to ELAS control, and on 22 April, the Italians abandoned Metsovo, a vital communication node between eastern and western Greece. This withdrawal was not always peaceful—on 12 March, an Italian motorized column razed the village of Tsaritsani, burning 360 of its 600 houses and shooting 40 civilians—but it led to the creation of liberated zones in much of the interior of Greece; on 16 April an Italian report noted that "control throughout the north-east, centre and south-west of Greece remains very precarious, not to say nonexistent".

== Sources ==
- Eudes, Dominique (1973). The Kapetanios: Partisans and Civil War in Greece, 1943–1949. Translated by John Howe. New York and London: Monthly Review Press. ISBN 978-0-85345-275-1.
- Flountzis, Antonis (1977). Στρατόπεδα Λάρισας-Τρικάλων: Η γέννηση του αντάρτικου στη Θεσσαλία [Larisa-Trikala Camps: The Birth of the Partisan Movement in Thessaly] (in Greek). Athens: Papazisis. OCLC 8624538.
- Grigoriadis, Solon (1982). Συνοπτική Ιστορία της Εθνικής Αντίστασης, 1941–1944 [Concise History of the National Resistance, 1941–1944] (in Greek). Athens: Kapopoulos. OCLC 165816421.
- Hellenic Army History Directorate (1998). Αρχεία Εθνικής Αντίστασης, 1941–1944. Τόμος 3ος "Αντάρτικη Οργάνωση ΕΛΑΣ" [National Resistance Archives, 1941–1944. 3rd Volume "ELAS Partisan Organization"]. Athens: Hellenic Army History Directorate. ISBN 960-7897-31-5.
- Mazower, Mark (1993). Inside Hitler's Greece: The Experience of Occupation, 1941–44. New Haven and London: Yale University Press. ISBN 0-300-06552-3.
- Sarafis, Stefanos (1951). Greek Resistance Army: The Story of ELAS. London: Birch Books. OCLC 993128877.
- Vafeiadis, Markos (1985a). Απομνημονεύματα, Β' Τόμος (1940–1944) [Memoirs, Volume II (1940–1944)] (in Greek). Athens: A. A. Livanis. OCLC 13647438.
- Vafeiadis, Markos (1985b). Απομνημονεύματα, Γ' Τόμος (1944–1946) [Memoirs, Volume III (1944–1946)] (in Greek). Athens: A. A. Livanis. OCLC 13647438.
