= Battle of Karoutes =

- Part of Second World War, Greek resistance
| Date | 17 August 1944 |
| Location | Karoutes, Lidoriki |
| Result | ELAS victory |

Belligerents
| ELAS | 18th SS Mountain Division |

Casualties and losses
| 32–38 dead | >100 dead the rest captured |

The Battle of Karoutes, was fought on August 5, 1944, between the Greek People's Liberation Army (ELAS) and the 18th SS Mountain Division.

== Background ==
In August 1944, the Nazi occupation forces began an extermination campaign against the resistance guerilla units of Central Greece.

== Battle ==
On August 5, 1944, an ELAS unit, assisted by a few British and American saboteurs, trapped the German forces and attacked them. At least 100 Germans were killed, including their commander, and the rest surrendered. Resistance forces had 32-38 casualties.

== Aftermath ==
On August 29, 1944, a Nazi force bombarded and burned down a nearby village, Lidoriki. Whoever was found there was killed.
