= ELAS =

Militia in the Greek resistance against Axis occupation in WWII

Greek People's Liberation Army Ελληνικός Λαϊκός Απελευθερωτικός Στρατός ΕΛΑΣ
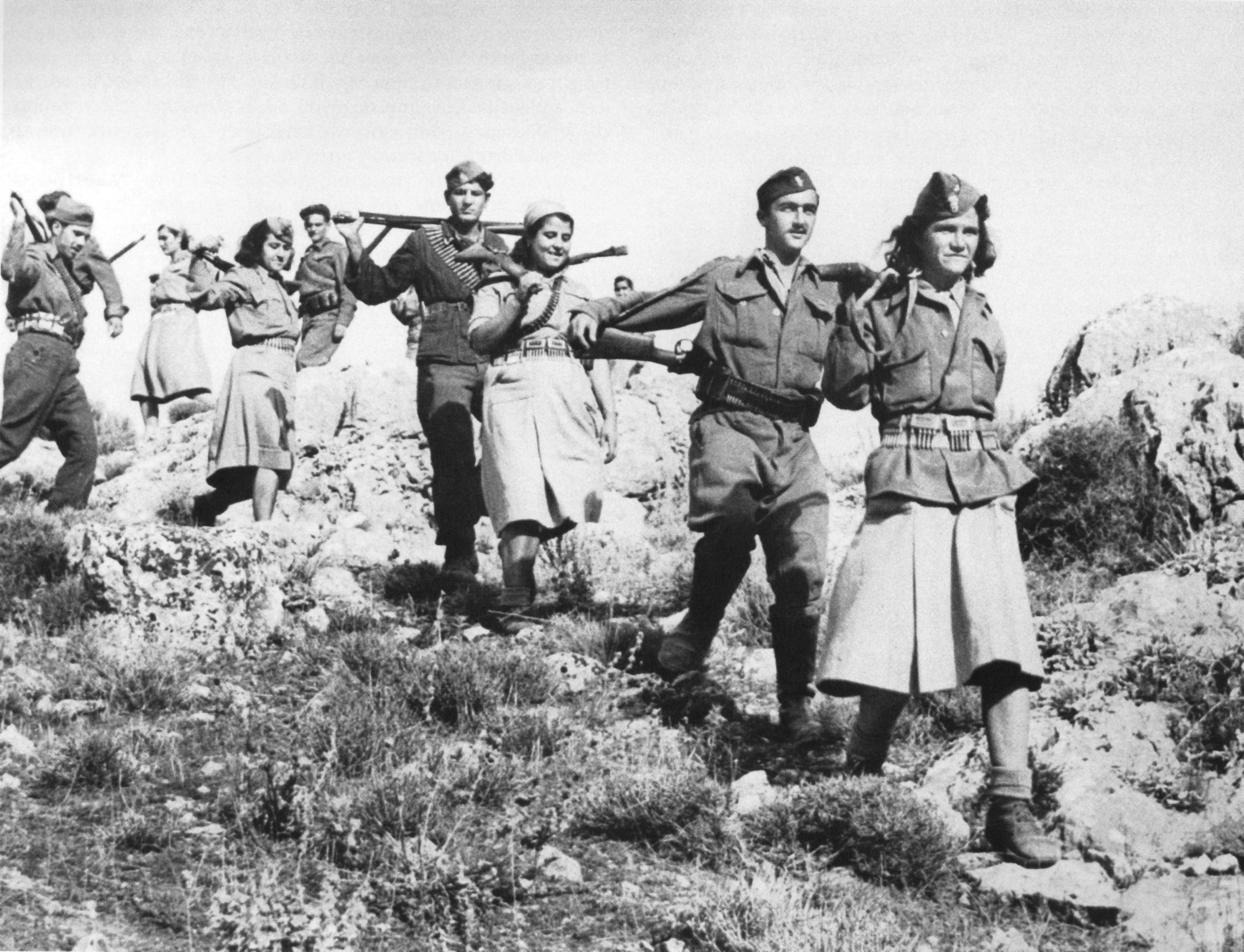
- ELAS partisans on Mount Parnitha
- Leaders: Aris Velouchiotis (Chief Captain); Major General Stefanos Sarafis (Chief military officer); Political commissar Andreas Tzimas (Chief political supervisor)
- Dates active: 1942–1945
- Dissolved: February 1945
- Allegiance: EAM; Mountain Government (1944)
- Ideology: Communism; Socialist patriotism Left-wing nationalism Anti-fascism
- Size: c. 50,000-85,000 (1944)
- Part of: National Liberation Front
- Wars: Greek Resistance; Dekemvriana

The Greek People's Liberation Army (Greek: Ελληνικός Λαϊκός Απελευθερωτικός Στρατός (ΕΛΑΣ), Ellinikós Laïkós Apeleftherotikós Stratós), known mostly by its acronym ELAS, was the largest and most significant military organization of the Greek resistance during World War II. It was the military arm of the National Liberation Front, a left-wing group whose main driving force was the Communist Party of Greece, during the period of the Greek resistance against the Axis occupation of Greece. It was disarmed and disbanded in February 1945, following the Dekemvriana clashes and the Varkiza Agreement.

== Birth of ELAS ==
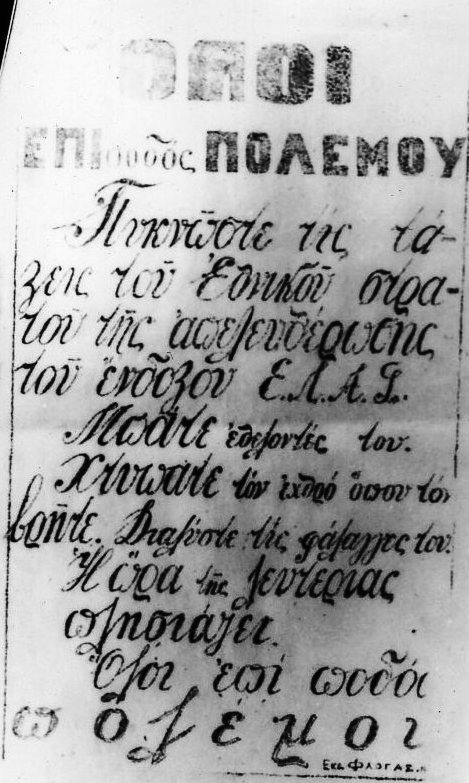
Call to become part of ELAS

Example of a flag of ELAS, with the organization's initials on the Greek national flag

With the German invasion and occupation of the country in April–May 1941, several hundred KKE members were able to escape and flee to the underground. Their first task was to reform the party, along with subsidiary groups like the "National Solidarity" (Εθνική Αλληλεγγύη, EA) welfare organization 28 May. After the German attack on the Soviet Union on 22 June and the break of the Molotov–Ribbentrop Pact, the newly reconstituted Communist Party found itself firmly on the anti-Axis camp, a line confirmed by the Party's 6th Plenum during 1–3 July. The Communists were committed to a "Popular Front" tactic, and tried to engage other parties from the left and the centre, including established pre-war politicians. However, the efforts proved largely fruitless. On 16 July, however, the "National Workers' Liberation Front" (Εθνικό Εργατικό Απελευθερωτικό Μέτωπο, ΕΕΑΜ) was established, bringing the country's labour union organizations together. At the ΚΚΕ's 7th Plenum, the establishment of EAM was decided despite the refusal of mainstream politicians to participate.

ΕΑΜ was founded on 27 September 1941 by representatives of four left-wing parties: Lefteris Apostolou for the ΚΚΕ, Christos Chomenidis for the Socialist Party of Greece (SKE), Ilias Tsirimokos for the Union of People's Democracy (ELD) and Apostolos Vogiatzis for the Agricultural Party of Greece (ΑΚΕ). ΕΑΜ's charter called for the "liberation of the Nation from foreign yoke" and the "guaranteeing of the Greek people's sovereign right to determine its form of government". At the same time, while the door was left open to cooperation with other parties, the ΚΚΕ, with its large size concerning its partners, assumed a clearly-dominant position within the new movement. Furthermore, the ΚΚΕ's well-organized structure and its experience with the conditions and necessities of underground struggle were crucial to ΕΑΜ's success. Georgios Siantos was appointed as the acting leader, since Nikolaos Zachariadis, the ΚΚΕ's proper leader, was interned in Dachau concentration camp. Siantos with his affable manner and modest ways was much more popular in the party than Zachariadis.

On February 16, 1942, EAM founded the Greek People's Liberation Army (ELAS), according to the KKE's 8th Plenum decision in January 1942. ELAS initiated actions against the German and Italian forces of occupation in Greece on 7 June 1942. A communist veteran, Athanasios (Thanasis) Klaras, known as Aris Velouchiotis, with a small group of 10–15 guerrillas, entered the village of Domnista in Evrytania in June 1942 and proclaimed in front of the surprised villagers that they were about to "start the war against the forces of Axis and their local collaborators". Initially, Velouchiotis also recruited traditional local mountain-living bandits, like Dimos Karalivanos, in order to create a small group of experts in guerilla warfare.

== Gorgopotamos ==
On a night in September 1942, a small group of British SOE officers parachuted into Greece near Mt. Giona. This group, led by Brigadier Eddie Myers, had been tasked to blow up one of three bridges (Gorgopotamos, Papadia or Asopos) of the country's main railway line, and to get the two main, but competing, guerrilla groups of ELAS and EDES to cooperate.

After much deliberation, the Gorgopotamos bridge was chosen due to the difficulty of making repairs to the structure. Dimos Karalivanos, an ELAS guerrilla, was the first guerrilla the British found. At the end of October a second group of British officers were parachuted into the Greek mountains. Their leaders were Themis Marinos and Colonel Christopher Woodhouse. Their mission was to locate the guerrillas of EDES and their leader Napoleon Zervas, who were friendlier to the British Middle East Command than ELAS, and co-operate with them. The two Greek groups eventually agreed to collaborate. The British did not favour the participation of ELAS, because it was a pro-communist group, but the forces of ELAS were larger and better organised, and without their participation, the mission was more likely to fail.

On November 14, the 12 British saboteurs, the forces of ELAS (150 men) and those of EDES (60-65 men) met in the village of Viniani in Evrytania and the operation started. Ten days later, they were at Gorgopotamos. On the night of November 25, at 23:00, the guerrillas started the attack against the Italian garrison. The Italians were startled, and after little resistance, were defeated. After the defeat of the Italians, the saboteurs set the explosives. ELAS forces had placed ambushes on the routes towards the bridge, to block the approach of Italian reinforcements. The explosion occurred at 03:00. Afterwards, the guerrillas' forces returned to Viniani, to celebrate the success of the mission.

The destruction of the Gorgopotamos bridge was, along with the Norwegian heavy water sabotage in Rjukan, one of the two biggest guerrilla acts in occupied Europe. The blowing up of the bridge disrupted the German transportation of ammunition via Greece to Rommel's forces for several weeks, taking place at a time when the Afrika Korps in North Africa, retreating after the defeat of El Alamein, were in need of supplies.

== Expansion of ELAS ==
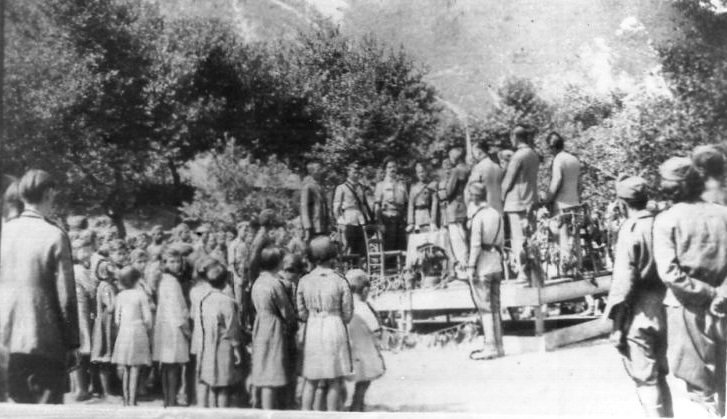
Taking an oath

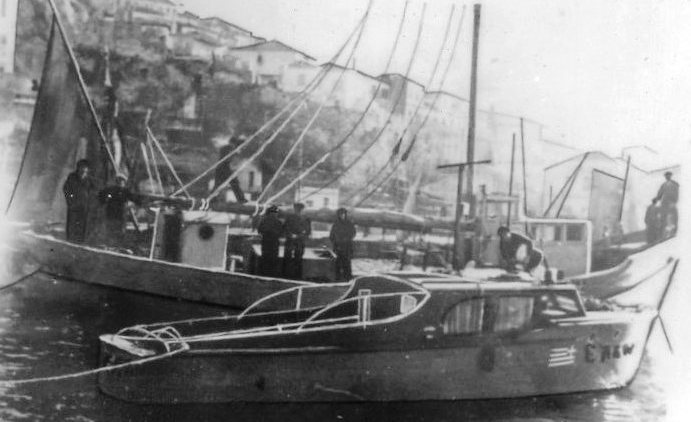
Ships of the Greek People's Liberation Navy

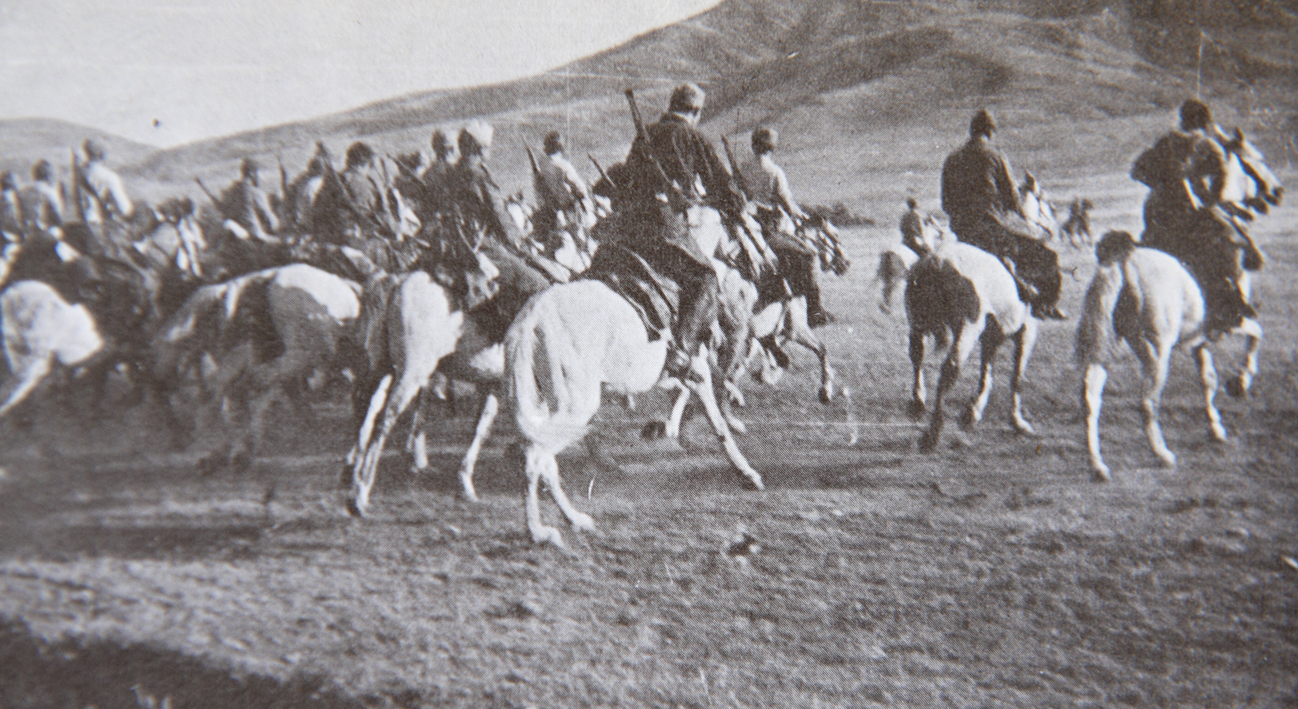
Cavalry

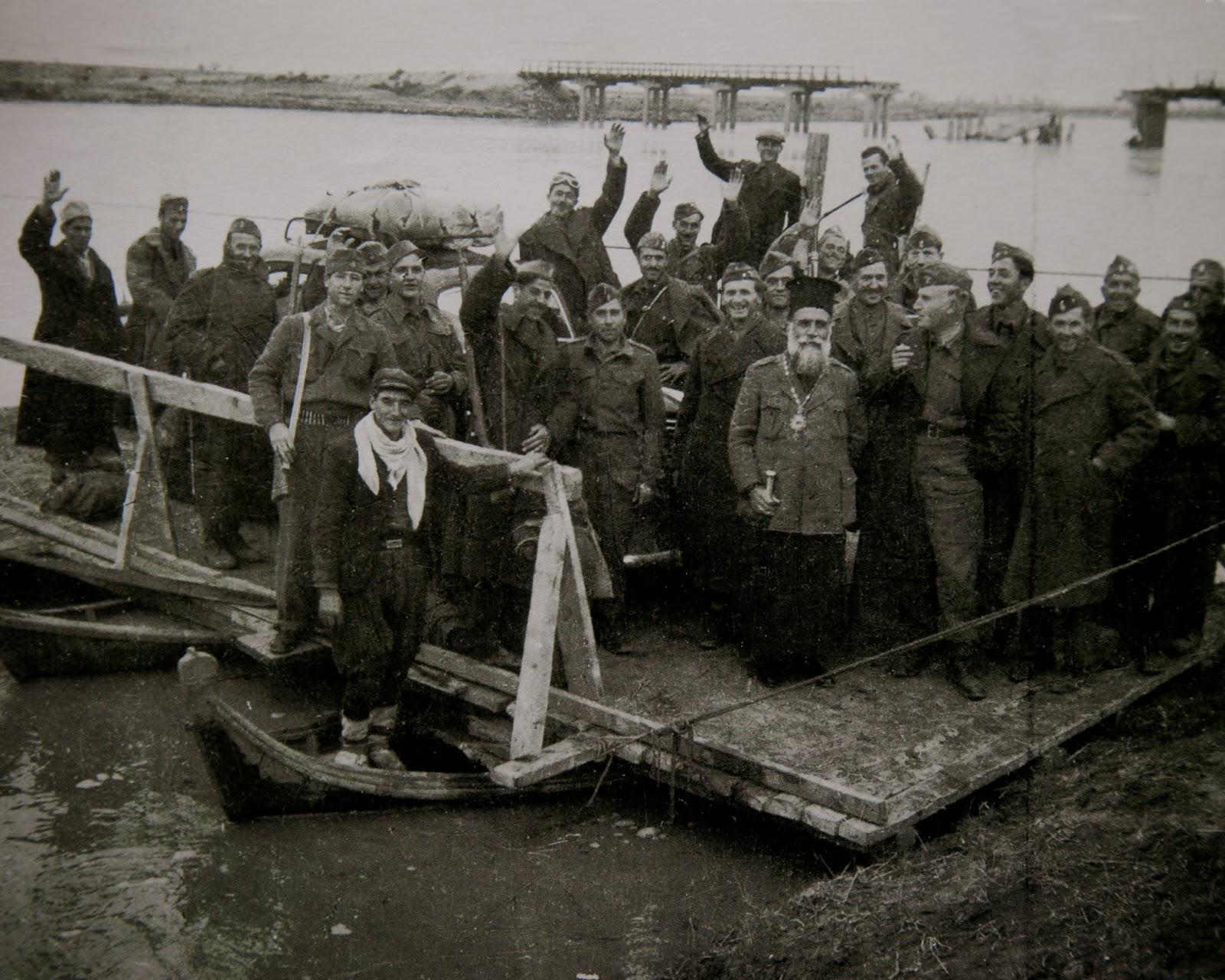
Metropolite Joachim of Kozani with guerillas of ELAS, Western Macedonia

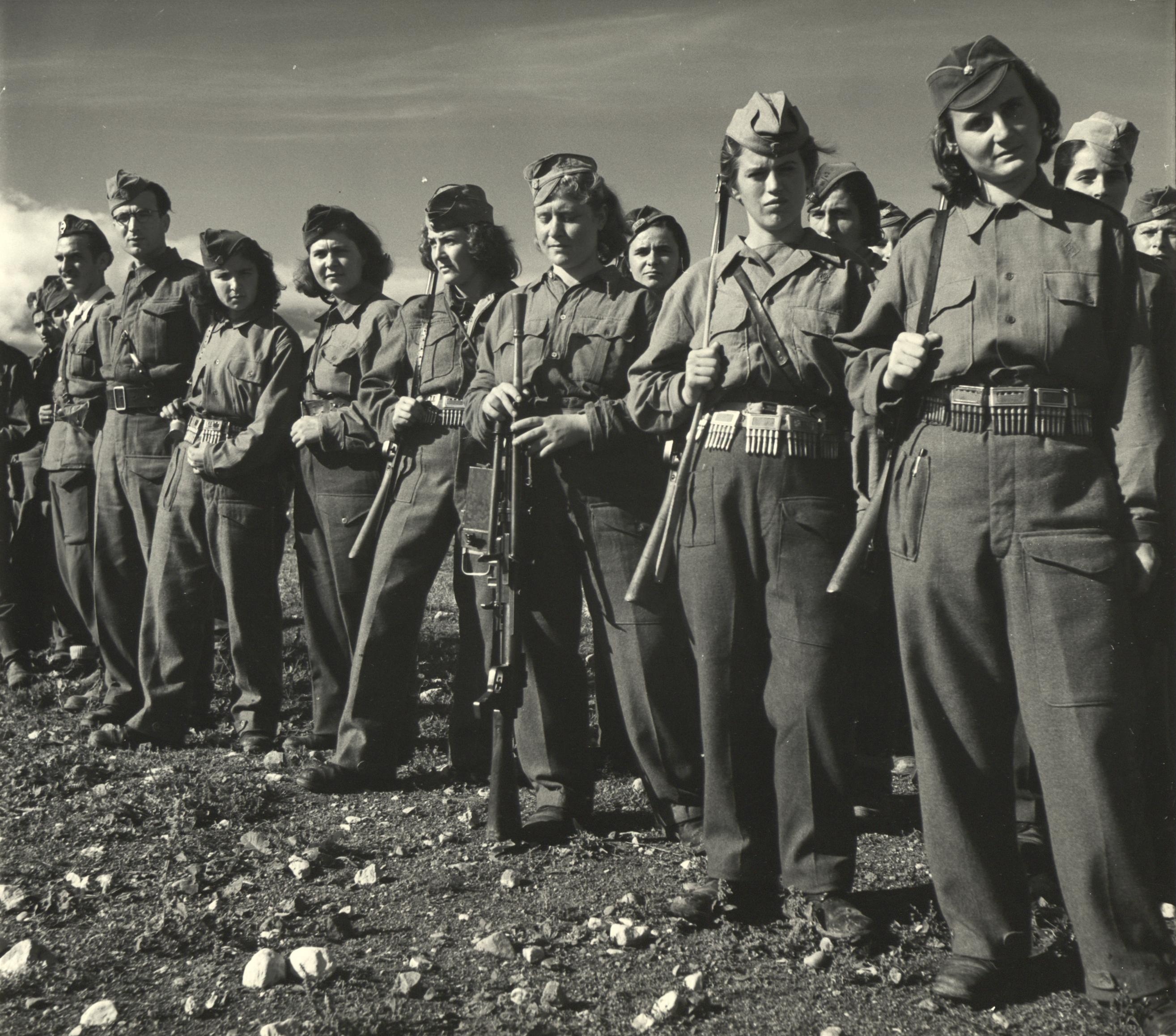
Women guerillas of ELAS

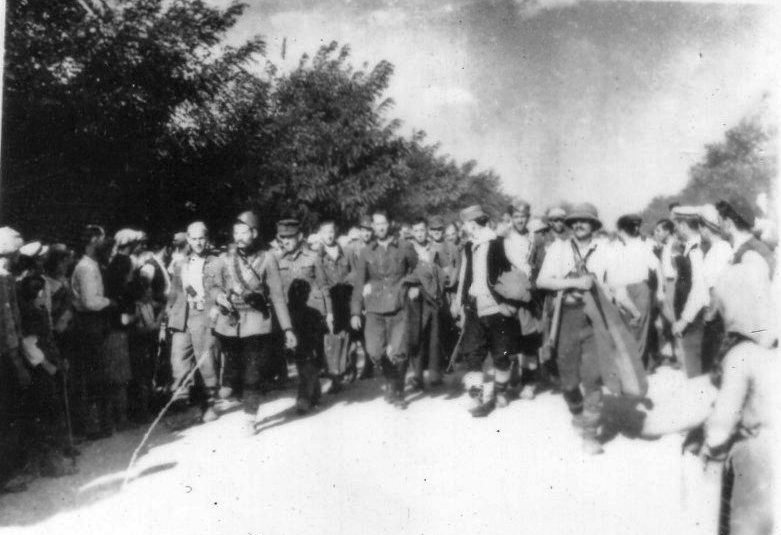
Captured Germans after operations in Thrace

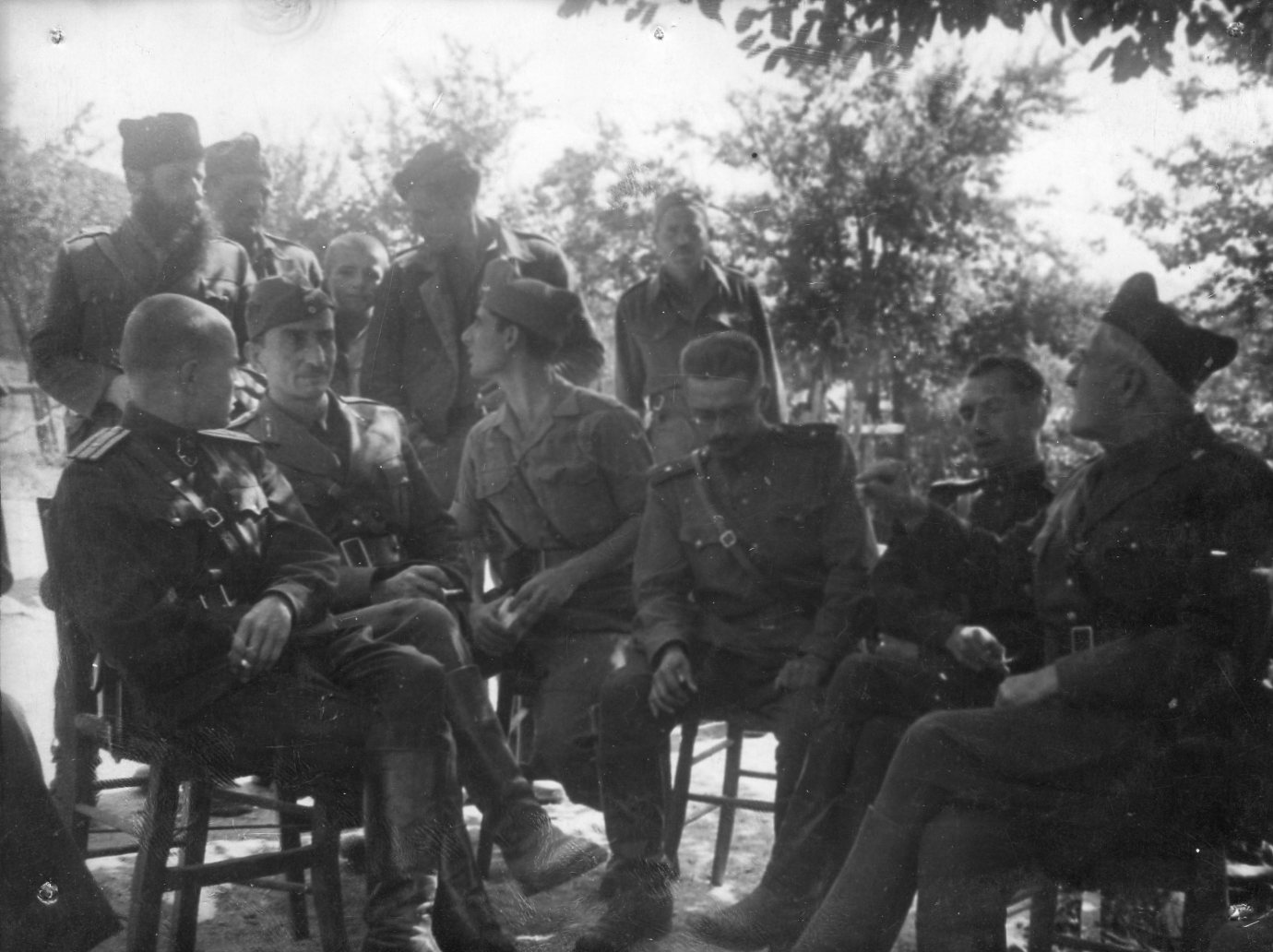
ELAS headquarters in Vermio mountain, with Soviet military mission, 1944

The blowing up of Gorgopotamos bridge favored ELAS. Soon, many of the inhabitants of the villages of Central Greece became members of ELAS. Furthermore, people sympathised with the ELAS guerrillas because they weren't helped by the British in contrast with EDES. When 25 guerrillas deserted from ELAS, Aris Velouchiotis went to Epirus to threaten Napoleon Zervas not to come in touch with them. Later, the 25 deserters were arrested and executed in the village of Sperhiada. The winter of 1942, ELAS groups were formed in other Greek regions, like Thessaly and Macedonia. In Central Greece, Aris Velouchiotis succeeded to form a powerful semi-conventional army which could attack German and Italian forces. Aris became a legendary figure who imposed an iron discipline in ELAS. At the same time, some members of ELAS (Periklis, Tasos Leuterias, Diamantis, Nikiforos, Thiseas, Dimos Karalivanos, and Belis) have been distinguished during the battles. Aris Velouchiotis formed a group of 30–35 men, called "Mavroskoufides" (the "black caps"), who were his personal guards. During the winter of 1942–1943, new units of ELAS were composed in many regions of Greece. Some areas in the mountains of Central Greece passed from the control of Axis forces to that of ELAS.

The leadership of ELAS followed a triadic form, from its top down to platoon level: the captain (kapetánios), elected by the men and the overall leader of the unit, the military specialist (stratiotikós), usually a regular army officer, responsible for tactical planning and training, and the political leader (politikós), usually a KKE member, as EAM's representative. At its top, the General Headquarters of ELAS, these positions were filled by Aris Velouchiotis, Stefanos Sarafis and Andreas Tzimas (nom-de-guerre: Vasilis Samariniotis).

Two events of great importance took place in this period. KKE, after passing great difficulties, succeeded in reorganizing its groups destroyed by Metaxas. Many members were recruited and with the help of ELAS, which became the largest partisan army in Greece, EAM became the largest mass political organization in Greek history, claiming over 1.5 million members, enlisted in organizations that covered every neighborhood in every village. The second great event was the foundation of the United Panhellenic Organization of Youth (EPON) (Greek: Ενιαία Πανελλαδική Οργάνωση Νέων). In 1943, a small naval auxiliary navy, the Greek People's Liberation Navy (ELAN) was also founded.

Two years after its foundation, ELAS' military strength had grown from the small group of fighters in Domnitsa to a force of some 50,000 partisans (estimates of the British government) or even as many as 85,000, according to EAM sources; EAM itself, and its associated organizations, had grown to a membership of anywhere from 500,000 to 750,000 (according to Anthony Eden) up to two million, in a country of 7.5 million inhabitants. ELAS was thus one of the largest resistance groups formed in Europe, similar to the French Maquis, the Italian Resistance and the Yugoslavian Partisans, but smaller than the Polish resistance.

== The "Mountain Government" ==
On 10 March 1944 the EAM-ELAS, now in control of most of the country, established the Political Committee of National Liberation (PEEA), widely known as the "Mountain Government" (Greek: Κυβέρνηση του βουνού, romanized: Kyvérnisi tou vounoú), in effect a third Greek government to rival the collaboration one in Athens and the government-in-exile in Cairo. Its aims, according to its founding Act, were, "to intensify the struggle against the conquerors (...) for full national liberation, for the consolidation of the independence and integrity of our country (...) and for the annihilation of domestic fascism and armed traitor formations."

PEEA was elected in liberated territories and in occupied ones by 2,000,000 Greek citizens. It was historically the first time women could vote. PEEA ministers covered a wide political spectrum from left to center.

== Fighting against other Resistance groups ==
After the Soviet victory in the Battle of Stalingrad in early 1943, it was clear that Axis would lose the war. Soon, clashes appeared between the various Resistance organizations regarding the post-war political situation in Greece.

In October 1943 ELAS launched major attacks against EDES and the guerrilla group of Tsaous Anton in Northern Greece, precipitating a civil war across many parts of Greece which continued until February 1944, when the British agents in Greece negotiated a ceasefire (the Plaka agreement); ELAS broke the agreement by attacking the 5/42 Evzone Regiment, murdering the EKKA resistance group leader, Dimitrios Psarros, in as yet unclear and hotly debated circumstances and executing all the captives.

ELAS became the strongest of all resistance armed organizations, controlling by 1944 military three-fifths of the country (mainly the mountains) having in its ranks more than 800 military officers of the former National Army Of Negrs. ELAS engaged in battles against other resistance groups, besides the para-military forces of the collaborationist government. ELAS initially began to attack the National Republican Greek League (EDES) on accusations of collaboration with the Germans. ELAS attacked also the Panhellenic Liberation Organization (PAO), another resistance organization, concentrated in Northern Greece, in the area of Macedonia with accusations of collaboration. The armed power of the two major organizations was not comparable, as EDES had approx. 12,000 guerrillas, while ELAS' power was much stronger. Small battles were taking place in Epirus where EDES had its main force. This situation led to triangular battles among ELAS, EDES and the Germans. Given the support of the British and the Greek Cairo Government for EDES, these conflicts precipitated a civil war.

== Dekemvriana ==
In autumn 1944, after the liberation, ELAS was the dominant force in the country and had captured all the major Greek cities, except Athens (after an agreement in Caserta with the Greek government in exile).

After the events of the Dekemvriana, ELAS was disarmed according to the treaty of Varkiza. During the Dekemvriana fighting in Athens, Franklin D. Roosevelt issued a statement disapproving of fighting between the British and EAM, and in private was reportedly appalled by what was happening in Greece. According to his son Elliott, Roosevelt privately stated "How the British can dare such a thing!... Killing Greek guerrillas! Using British soldiers for such a job! Likewise, American media coverage of the Dekemvriana was overwhelmingly hostile towards the British with American journalists criticizing Churchill for recruiting the Security Battalions to fight for the unpopular King George against the EAM.

Later most of its fighters (mostly KKE members) joined the Democratic Army of Greece during the civil war.

== Hymn ==
The hymn of ELAS was written in March 1944 by Sofia Mavroeidi-Papadaki and music by Nikos Tsakonas.

Greek

Με το τουφέκι μου στον ώμο, σε πόλεις κάμπους και χωριά, της Λευτεριάς ανοίγω δρόμο; της στρώνω βάγια και περνά.

Εμπρός Ε.Λ.Α.Σ. για την Ελλάδα, το Δίκιο και τη Λευτεριά; σ’ ακροβουνό και σε κοιλάδα, πέτα! πολέμα με καρδιά.

Ένα τραγούδι είν’ η πνοή σου, καθώς στη ράχη ροβολάς, και αντιλαλούν απ’ τη φωνή σου καρδιές και κάμποι: ΕΛΑΣ! ΕΛΑΣ!

Παντού η Πατρίδα μ’ έχει στείλει, φρουρό μαζί κι εκδικητή, κι απ’ την ορμή μου θ’ ανατείλει καινούργια λεύτερη ζωή.

Με χίλια ονόματα, μία χάρη, ακρίτας ειτ’ αρματολός, αντάρτης, κλέφτης, παλικάρι; πάντα ειν’ ο ίδιος ο λαός.

Translation
Carrying my rifle on my shoulder, through cities, meadows, and villages, I clear the road for Freedom to come, laying for Her bay-leaves so She can pass.

Stand up, E.L.A.S. for Greece, for what's right and for Freedom; in mountain peaks and in valleys, fly! Fight with your heart.

Your breath is a song, walking down the spine of the mountain, the echo of your voice spreads to hearts and meadows: E.L.A.S.! E.L.A.S.!

Everywhere I have been, my homeland had sent me, to guard and to avenge, from my strong drive, a new free life shall rise.

Thousand names, but the spirit is one in them all, akritas or armatolos, guerrilla, klepht, lad; it's always the People.

== List of important battles ==
1942

- The battle of Reka (40 Italians killed)
- The battle of Mikro Chorio (70 Italians killed)
- November 1942 – The battle of Gorgopotamos

1943

- March 1943 – The battle of Fardykambos (together with PAO, 95 Italians killed)
- June 1943 – The destruction of the Kournovo Tunnel (c.100 Italians killed)
- July 1943 – The battle of Myrtia
- The battle of Sarantaporo (99 Germans killed)
- The battle of Porta (many Italians killed)
- September 1943 – The battle of Arachova

1944

- February 23, 1944 – Blowing up a German train in Tempi under the guidance of the chief saboteur of ELAS Antonis Vratsanos with 450 German soldiers dead
- March 1944 – The battle of Kokkinia
- April 1944 – The battle of Kaisariani
- June 1944 – The battle of Steiri (40 Germans killed)
- July 1944 – The battle of Chora - Agorelitsa (180 Germans killed)
- July 1944 – The battle of Amfilochia
- The capture of Kastoria
- The capture of Elefsina military airport
- August 1944 – Battle of Karoutes
- September 1944 – Battle of Kalamata
- September 1944 – Battle of Meligalas

== List of important ELAS members ==
This list contains the names of some of the most well-known ELAS leaders or simple members, with their nom de guerre in parentheses:

- Athanasios Klaras (Aris Velouchiotis), chief captain of ELAS
- Colonel Stefanos Sarafis, chief military expert of ELAS
- Andreas Tzimas (Vasilis Samariniotis), chief political commissioner of ELAS
- Georgios Siantos
- Major General Neokosmos Grigoriadis (Lambros), Chairman of ELAS Central Committee
- Lieutenant General Ptolemaios Sarigiannis, Chief of Staff of ELAS Central Committee
- Colonel Evripidis Bakirtzis, commander of ELAS' Macedonian theatre
- Captain Theodoros Makridis (Ektoras), one of ELAS chief staff officers
- Alexandros Rosios (Ypsilantis)
- Markos Vafiadis, Macedonian theatre
- Nikos Beloyannis
- Charilaos Florakis (Kapetan Jiotis)
- Vasilis Liropoulos (Kapetan Liras), Macedonian theatre
- Iannis Xenakis
- Giannis Aggeletos (Leon Tzavelas), black beret
- Giannis Economou (Giannoutsos), black beret
- Panos Tzavelas
- Evangelos Yannopoulos (Varjianis)
- Father Dimitrios Holevas (Papa-Holevas, Papaflessas)
- Father Germanos Dimakos (Papa-Anypomonos)
- Alberto Errera
- Moisis Michail Bourlas (Byron)
- Fotis Mastrokostas (Thanos), black beret
- Kostas Kavretzis (Kostoulas Agrafiotis), black beret
- Stavros Mavrothalassitis
- Babis Klaras, brother of Aris Velouchiotis
- Giannis Madonis (Ektoras), black beret
- Giannis Nikolopoulos (Leon), black beret
- Dimitrios Dimitriou (Nikiforos)
- Giorgos Houliaras (Periklis)
- Pantelis Laskas (Pelopidas), black beret
- Epaminontas Chairopoulos (Karaiskakis), black beret
- Ioannis Alexandrou (Diamantis)
- Lambros Koumbouras (Achilleas)
- Spyros Tsiligiannis (Lefteris Chrysiotis), black beret
- Kostas Athanasiou (Doulas), black beret
- Sarantos Kapourelakos, serving directly under Velouchiotis' command.
- Spyros Bekios (Lambros)
- Dimitrios Tassos (Boukouvalas)
- Thomas Pallas (Kozakas)
- Nikos Xinos (Smolikas)
- Vangelis Papadakis (Tassos Lefterias)
- Vasilis Priovolos (Ermis)
- Giannis Podias, Cretan theatre
- Michalis Samaritis, Cretan theatre
- Gerasimos Avgeropoulos
- Andreas Zacharopoulos (Andreas Patrinos)
- Ioannis Hatzipanagiotou (Thomas)
- Filotas Adamidis (Katsonis), Macedonian theatre
- Mirka Ginova (Irene Gini), Macedonian theatre
- Christos Margaritis (Armatolos)
- Georgios Zarogiannis (Kavallaris)
- Vasilis Ganatsios (Cheimarros)
- Panagiotis G. Tesseris, Secretary of the ELAS Guerrilla Warfare Training Committee (Laconia Region)
- Yiorgos Boukouvalas, second lieutenant of the ELAS, member of EPON's elite corps (Grevena Region)

== See also ==
- The 200 of Kaisariani
- Partisans
- EPON
- Refugees of the Greek Civil War

== Sources ==
- Close, David H. (1995). The Origins of the Greek Civil War. Addison-Wesley Longman. ISBN 978-0582064713.
- Eudes, Dominique (1973). The Kapetanios: Partisans and Civil War in Greece, 1943–1949. Translated by John Howe. New York and London: Monthly Review Press. ISBN 978-0-85345-275-1.
- Grigoriadis, Solon (1982). Συνοπτική Ιστορία της Εθνικής Αντίστασης, 1941–1944 [Concise History of the National Resistance, 1941–1944] (in Greek). Athens: Kapopoulos.
- Αρχεία Εθνικής Αντίστασης, 1941–1944. Τόμος 3ος "Αντάρτικη Οργάνωση ΕΛΑΣ" [National Resistance Archives, 1941–1944. 3rd Volume "ELAS Partisan Organization"]. Athens: Hellenic Army History Directorate. 1998.
- Αρχεία Εθνικής Αντίστασης, 1941–1944. Τόμος 4ος "Αντάρτικη Οργάνωση ΕΛΑΣ" [National Resistance Archives, 1941–1944. 4th Volume "ELAS Partisan Organization"]. Athens: Hellenic Army History Directorate. 1998.
- Mazower, Mark (2001). Inside Hitler's Greece: The Experience of Occupation, 1941–44. New Haven and London: Yale University Press. ISBN 0-300-08923-6.
- Sarafis, Stefanos (1951). Greek Resistance Army: The Story of ELAS. London: Birch Books. OCLC 993128877.
- Stavrianos, L. S. (1952). "The Greek National Liberation Front (EAM): A Study in Resistance Organization and Administration". The Journal of Modern History. 24 (1): 42–55. doi:10.1086/237474. JSTOR 1871980. S2CID 143755996.
- Vafeiadis, Markos (1985). Απομνημονεύματα, Β' Τόμος (1940–1944) [Memoirs, Volume II (1940–1944)] (in Greek). Athens: A. A. Livanis.
- Vafeiadis, Markos (1985). Απομνημονεύματα, Γ' Τόμος (1944–1946) [Memoirs, Volume III (1944–1946)] (in Greek). Athens: A. A. Livanis.
- "Original Official ELAS Military Release Document". E.L.A.S. 1945.
- Weinberg, Gerhard (2005). A World In Arms A Global History of World War II. Cambridge: Cambridge University Press. ISBN 9-780521-618267.
- Stavrianos, L. S. (1952). "The Greek National Liberation Front (EAM): A Study in Resistance Organization and Administration". The Journal of Modern History. 24 (1): 42–55. doi:10.1086/237474. JSTOR 1871980. S2CID 143755996.
