= Moisis Michail Bourlas =

Greek resistance member

Moisis Michail Bourlas (Greek: Μωυσής Μιχαήλ Μπουρλάς; May 9, 1918 – March 17, 2011) was a Greek Jewish member of the World War II resistance.

== Biography ==
He was born Moisis Bourlas on May 9, 1918 in Cairo. His parents were both Greek Jews; his father from the city of Volos and his mother from the island of Khios. Moisis was the fourth child of a large family. His parents were forced to return to Greece due to financial problems. The Bourlas family first established in Naousa and then in Thessaloniki. Since his childhood Moisis assisted his father who was employed in a bakery.

After finishing high school, he became an apprentice turner (lathe operator). In 1935, Bourlas became a member of OKNE, the Organization of Communist Youths of Greece. When World War II erupted, Bourlas was serving in the Engineers' Arms of the Greek Military in the Greek part of Thrace. As an army bridge constructor, he was transferred to the Albanian front to combat the Italian invasion of 1940-1941, where he fought in the front line. In February 1943, right after the Nazi occupation forces had imposed their "racial measures" that eventually led to the Holocaust, Bourlas joined the resistance forces of ELAS (Greek National Liberation Army) under the alias "Byron", and fought in the 30th Regiment on the mountain of Paiko near Kilkis.

In the summer of 1945, after the Varkiza agreement that preluded the Greek Civil War, Bourlas was arrested for his political convictions and exiled in the Greek islands of Icaria, Makronisos and Ai Stratis. Thanks to a Greek-Israeli agreement in 1951, Bourlas was released from his exile and immigrated to Israel. He worked there as a turner, while he was actively involved in the Communist Party of Israel and the workers' movement. He stayed in Israel until 1967, when the anti-communism of the Israeli society developed after the Six-Day War forced him and his Russian Jewish wife to flee the country. After a short stay in Bulgaria, Bourlas and his wife went to the Soviet Union, where they established in a town near the Ural Mountains. During his stay in the Soviet Union, Bourlas adopted the middle name "Michail".

Bourlas continued to work as a turner until 1982, when he became a pensioner and started his efforts to return to Greece. He established in the city of Sukhumi in the Georgian SSR, where he became a Greek language teacher to the young Greek students of the area. He returned to Greece in August 1990, without any resources or financial aid, where he started a new struggle to survive and regain his Greek citizenship that he had lost when he emigrated to Israel. Bourlas eventually succeeded to regain his citizenship in 1999. In 2000, he published his autobiography "Greek, Jew and Left" (Greek: Έλληνας, Εβραίος και Αριστερός) under the name of Moisis Michail Bourlas.

During the last years of his life, Moisis Michail Bourlas lived in the Saoul Modiano Home for the Elderly in Thessaloniki. He continued to be actively involved in the Greek left and the city's affairs. In 2002 and again in 2006, he ran as a candidate for the city council of Thessaloniki, in the ticket of "Thessaloniki for Citizens and Ecology" led by Tasos Kourakis. He died on March 17, 2011. His remains are buried in the Jewish cemetery of Stavroupoli, Thessaloniki.

== See also ==
- History of Modern Greece
