= Pertouli =

Pertouli Περτούλι
- Community
- Location within Greece
- Coordinates: 39°32′N 21°28′E
- Country: Greece
- Administrative region: Thessaly
- Regional unit: Trikala
- Municipality: Pyli
- Municipal unit: Aithikes

Population (2021)
  - Community: 102
- Time zone: UTC+2 (EET)
  - Summer (DST): UTC+3 (EEST)

Pertouli is a small mountain village within the province of Trikala in Greece and is situated at an altitude of 1,150 metres on the central part of the Pindos mountain range.

Pertouli is also famous for the nearby ski resort with snow sports fans in central Greece. The ski runs start at 1,170m and the highest point is at 1,340m altitude. The longest run has a distance of 1,500 metres. The ski resort of Pertouli is relatively small and has suffered from unreliable snow conditions in the past few years due to its low altitude.

== Gallery ==
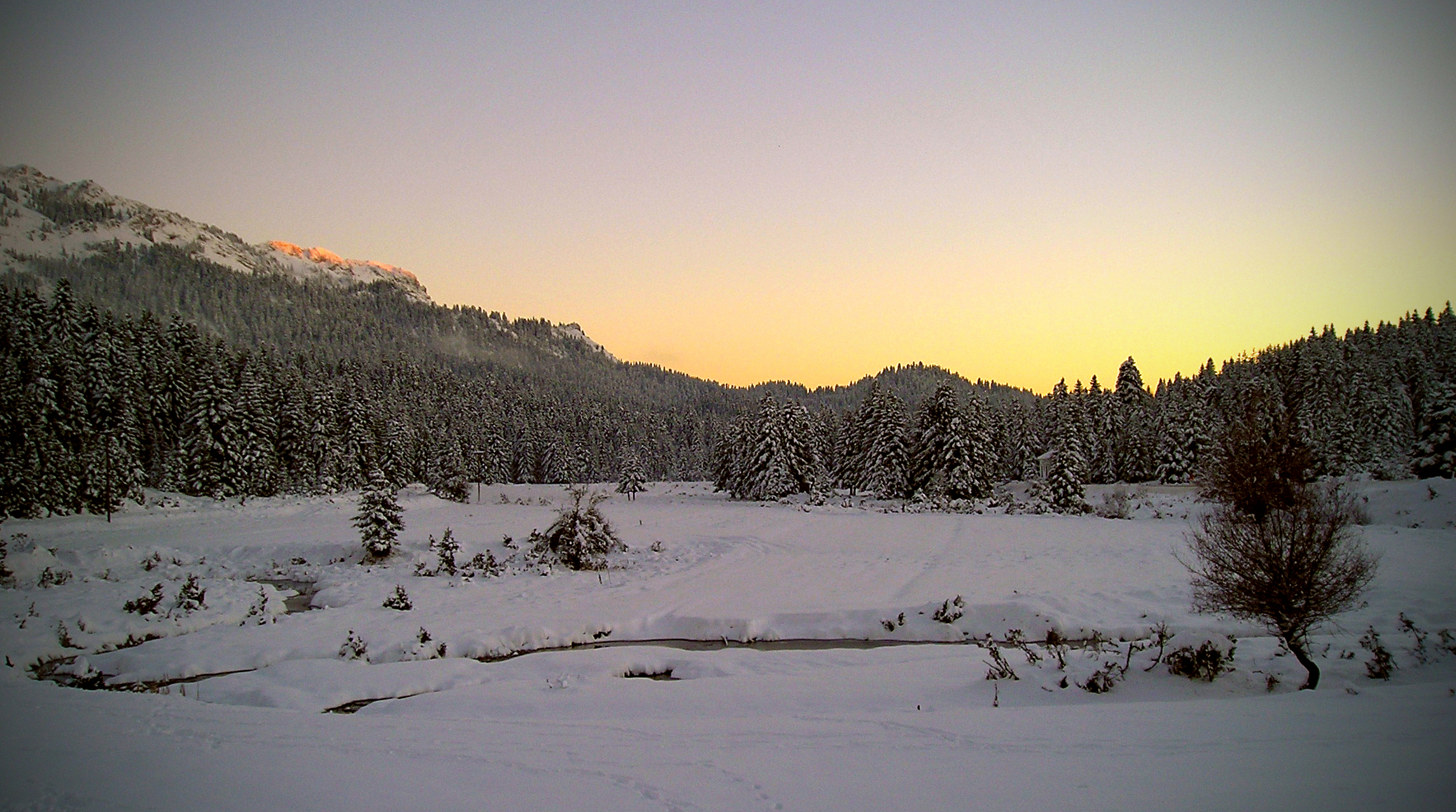
Pertouli fields

Fresh snow in Pertouli

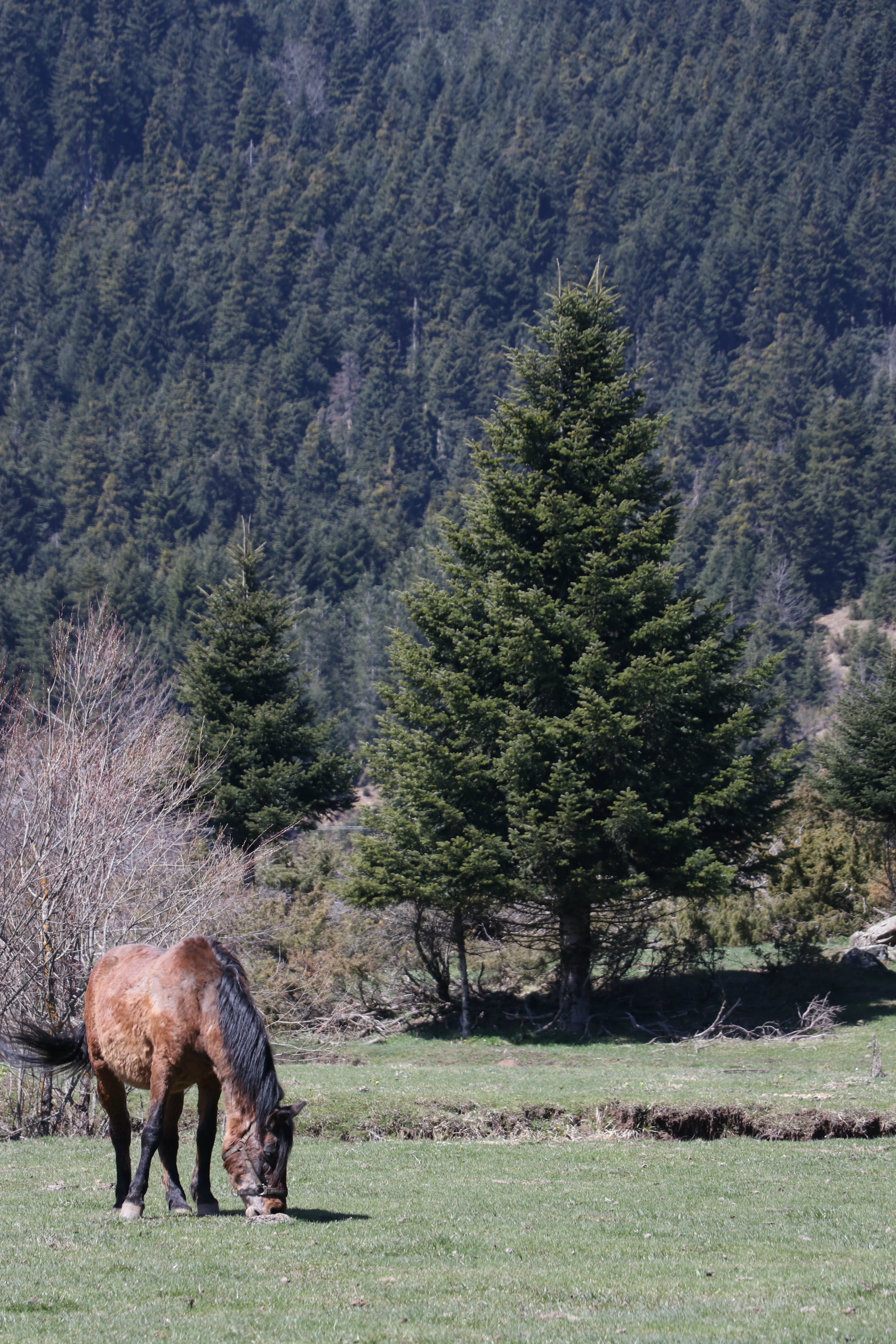
A view

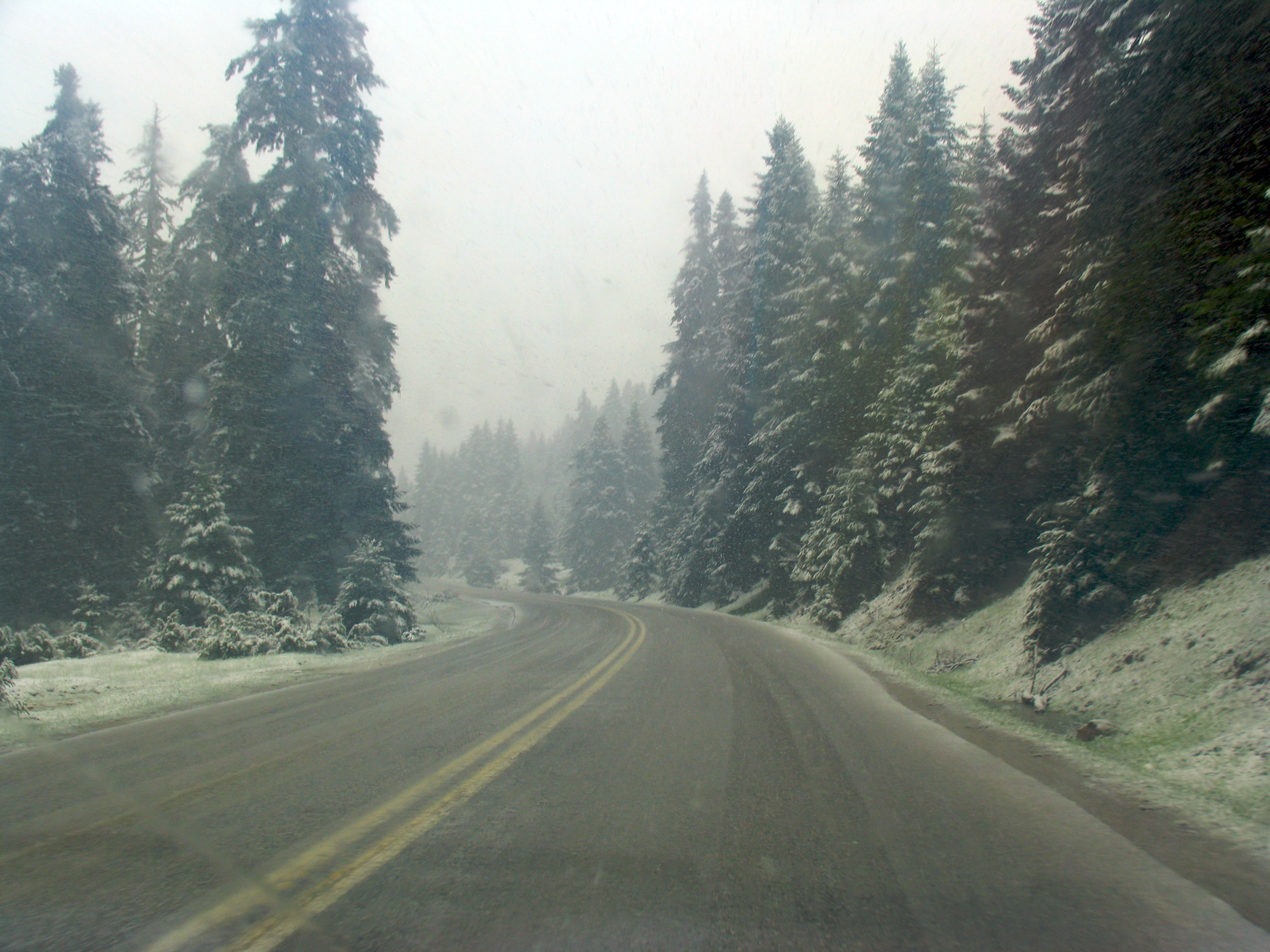
Road to Pertouli
