= Neokosmos Grigoriadis =

Greek soldier and politician

- Νεόκοσμος Γρηγοριάδης
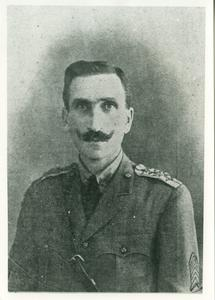
- Neokosmos Grigoriadis c. 1920s.
- Born: c. 1879; Constantinople, Ottoman Empire (now Istanbul, Turkey)
- Died: c. 1967
- Relatives: Solon Grigoriadis (son)
- Military career
- Allegiance: Kingdom of Greece; Provisional Government of National Defence
- Branch: Hellenic Army
- Conflicts: Macedonian Struggle; Balkan Wars; World War I Greek Resistance; Greek Civil War
- Other work: Senator for Edessa (1929-1935), Chairman of the National Council

Neokosmos Grigoriadis (Greek: Νεόκοσμος Γρηγοριάδης; 1879– c. 1967) was a Hellenic Army general, notable for his involvement in the Greek Resistance during World War II as a leading member of the left-wing National Liberation Front (EAM).

== Biography ==
Neokosmos Grigoriadis was born in 1879 in Constantinople, Ottoman Empire (today Istanbul, Turkey) to a Greek family. He initially graduated from the Hellenic Army's NCO Academy but eventually he became a regular commissioned officer, and by the end of his military career he had achieved the rank of Major General.

Grigoriadis had an eventful military career. From 1907 to 1909 he was posted in Vodena (then still part of the Ottoman Empire) as a secret agent working against Turkish and Bulgarian interests during the Macedonian Struggle; officially, he was principal of Vodena's Greek primary school.

He took part in the revolutionary Goudi Coup in 1909, fought in the Balkan Wars and World War I, and sided with the Venizelists during the National Schism. In 1920, after the royalist electoral victory, he was discharged from the Army, but he was recommissioned in 1922 by the 11 September 1922 Revolution, and participated in the Trial of the Six as "revolutionary commissioner" (public prosecutor). In 1926 he was promoted to Major General, and later that year left the Army for good.

Grigoriadis was then involved in politics, being elected senator for Edessa (renamed from Vodena) for Venizelos's Liberal Party (1929-1935). However, during the late 1930s he increasingly sympathized with the Left. After the German invasion of Greece and the Nazi occupation, Grigoriadis was an active member of the left-wing National Liberation Front (EAM), culminating in his role as Chairman of the "National Council" that EAM created in 1944 in order to supervise the drafting of a new constitution for post-liberation Greece.

Neokosmos Grigoriadis died in 1967. His son, Solon Grigoriadis (1912–1994), was a respected military writer, historian and journalist.
