= Greek People's Liberation Navy =

Naval force of the Greek People's Liberation Army

Greek People's Liberation Navy Ελληνικό Λαϊκό Απελευθερωτικό Ναυτικό
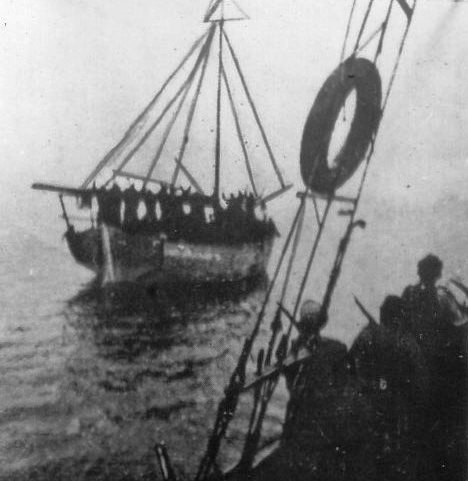
- An ELAN ship seizes a vessel during patrol
- Dates active: 1942–1945
- Size: ~1,200 men, ~100 mostly small armed boats
- Part of: National Liberation Front
- Wars: the Greek Resistance and the Dekemvriana

The Greek People's Liberation Navy (Greek: Ελληνικό Λαϊκό Απελευθερωτικό Ναυτικό; Elliniko Laiko Apeleftherotiko Naftiko), commonly abbreviated as ELAN (ΕΛΑΝ), was the naval force of the communist-led Greek People's Liberation Army (ELAS) resistance movement during World War II, and later during the Greek Civil War.

ELAN was essentially an auxiliary coastal force, operating mostly caïque and other small vessels near the coasts of the Greek mainland and between the islands. By mid-1944 however it had grown to about 100 mostly small armed boats and over 1,200 men, divided into seven squadrons of three or four flotillas with up to six vessels each.

== Structure ==
By the time of Liberation in late October 1944, ELAN was organized into six squadrons and a number of independent detachments, named after their areas of operations. These were:

- 1st Squadron operating in the western Peloponnese and Zakynthos
- 2nd Squadron operating in western Continental Greece and the northern Ionian Islands
- 3rd Squadron operating in the Euboic, Saronic and Malian gulfs
- 4th Squadron operating on the coasts of Pelion and the Pagasetic Gulf
- 5th Squadron operating on the coasts of Eastern Macedonia and Thrace
- 6th Squadron operating in the Thermaic Gulf and Chalcidice
- Independent Squadron operating in the Argolic Gulf
- ELAN of Chios
- ELAN of Lesbos
