= Solon Grigoriadis =

Solon Zephyros Grigoriadis (Greek: Σόλων Ζέφυρος Γρηγοριάδης; February 1912 – October 24, 1994) was a Greek Navy officer, journalist, writer and politician.

== Life ==
Son of Greek Army general and political figure Neokosmos Grigoriadis, Solon Grigoriadis was born in Edessa (Vodena) in 1912. In 1932 he graduated from the Hellenic Naval Academy as an ensign. However, his naval career was very brief; beginning in 1935, he worked for various Greek newspapers, writing articles on world politics, economics and geopolitics.

During World War II, and after the fall of Greece to the Nazis, he was active in the Greek Resistance, joining the left-wing National Liberation Front (EAM) and serving as an officer in the Greek People's Liberation Navy (ELAN), the naval branch of the more famous Greek People's Liberation Army (ELAS). He was also involved in politics, being elected in the "National Council" that EAM had set up, representing Edessa. His father Neokosmos Grigoriadis was Chairman of the Council.

As a war correspondent, Grigoriadis covered many important 20th century conflicts, such as the Vietnam War and the Prague Spring, and many of his articles and publications about strategy and politics were published in Greek and international military reviews. He was the first Greek journalist who visited Vietnam in 1965, as a war correspondent.

His writing style combined historical accuracy with journalistic flavor, and this was a major factor in the success of his works.

He died in Athens in October 1994.

== Works ==
His works include:

- Η Ιστορία της Σύγχρονης Ελλάδας 1941-1974 (History of modern Greece 1941-1974)
- Δεκέμβρης-Εμφύλιος 1944-1949 (Dekemvriana - Civil War 1944-1949)
- Συνοπτική Ιστορία της Εθνικής Αντίστασης (Concise History of the Greek Resistance)
- Οικονομική Ιστορία Ελλάδας (Economic History of Greece)
