= Stefanos Sarafis =

Greek communist guerrilla during World War II and Greek Civil War (1906–1957)

Stefanos Sarafis Στέφανος Σαράφης
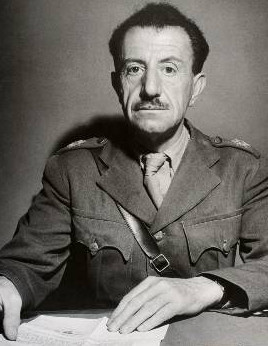
- Stefanos Sarafis in 1944
- Born: 23 October 1890; Trikala, Thessaly, Kingdom of Greece
- Died: 31 May 1957 (aged 66); Kalamaki, Kingdom of Greece
- Occupations: Military officer (Colonel in the Hellenic Army, Major General in EAM-ELAS) and politician
- Organization(s): National Liberation Front; Greek People's Liberation Army
- Political party: Party of Liberals (before the war); United Democratic Left (after the war)

Stefanos Sarafis (Greek: Στέφανος Σαράφης, 23 October 1890 – 31 May 1957) was an officer of the Hellenic Army and Major General in EAM-ELAS, who played an important role during the Greek Resistance.

== Early life and career ==
Sarafis was born at Trikala in 1890. He was an Aromanian. Sarafis studied law in the University of Athens. During the Balkan Wars, he enlisted in the Greek Army as a sergeant and was promoted to lieutenant in 1913. He became a Venizelist and played an active role in the various military conspiracies that were formed during the troubled 1920s. He participated in the two failed Venizelist coup attempts of 1933 and 1935. The latter was led by Nikolaos Plastiras and intended to overthrow the government of Prime Minister Panagis Tsaldaris. The failure of the coup resulted in the execution of its leader for treason and dishonorable discharges for several of the participants. Sarafis himself was condemned to life imprisonment but was pardoned by the government.

== In internal exile ==
Sarafis was exiled to the island of Milos which was populated but had no connection to military activities. He was thus effectively isolated from possible contacts with active Army members. In 1938, Sarafis was introduced to Marion Pascoe, an English student of the University of Oxford who visited the island to pursue her studies of archaeology. However, her limited knowledge of the Greek language prevented her from effectively communicating with the locals.

Sarafis was reportedly the only person on the island with working knowledge of the English language and volunteered to help her in communicating. Their private conversations over political beliefs and the History of Greece resulted in her lifelong interest in Greek matters. Marion later claimed to have fallen in love with Sarafis at this point.

== Second World War ==
Marion left Greece during the Greco-Italian War. Sarafis resurfaced as a leading figure of the Greek Resistance movement. Initially in contact with the Republican EDES and EKKA movements, in March 1943 he was arrested by guerillas of the communist EAM/Greek People's Liberation Army (ELAS). Despite his background, a month later Sarafis joined ELAS. His motives for this have been hotly contested, but he seems to have been impressed by ELAS' strength and at least partly sympathized with its political aims. In May, he was appointed as head of its general staff. From this position, he played a crucial role during the Resistance and later during the Dekemvriana.

After the military and political defeat of EAM in the Dekemvriana, he was captured and exiled to Serifos where Marion re-established correspondence with him in 1946. She had joined the League for Democracy in Greece in England, which campaigned for the release of political prisoners and reform of British policy towards Greece.

== Post-war activities ==
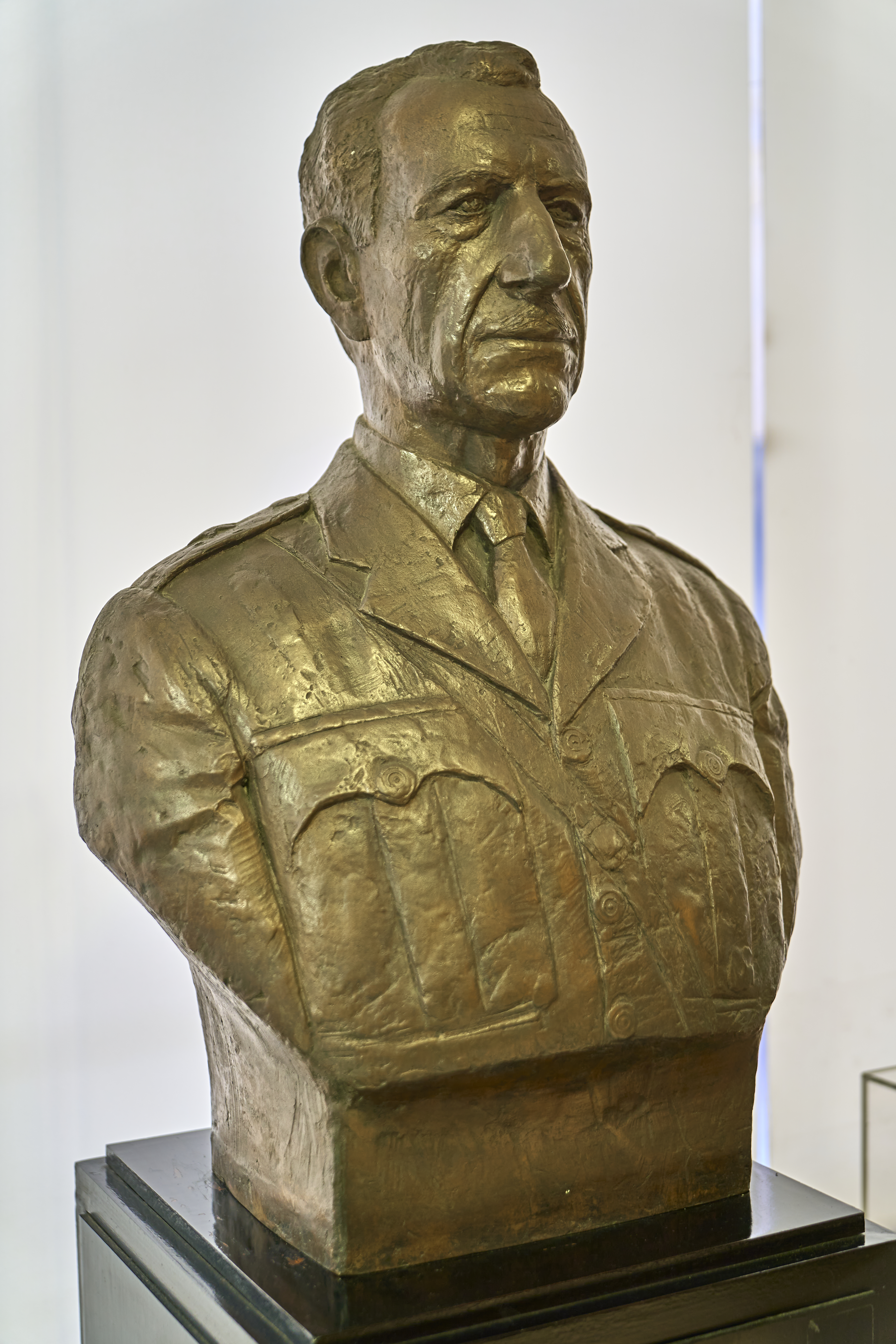
Bust of Stephanos Saraphis at Athens War Museum

Sarafis was eventually released in 1948 and married Marion in 1952. He joined the United Democratic Left at about this time. In the 1956 Greek legislative election, the United Democratic Left entered a coalition with the Republican Union, the Liberal Party (EP), the Rally of the Farmers and the Workers, National Progressive Union of the Centre and the Democratic Socialist Party. The coalition came second and managed to elect 132 MPs, while he was among them.

He was a pedestrian casualty in a car crash on 31 May 1957 in Alimos, a suburb of Athens. He and his wife Marion were taking a walk when an automobile driven by a non-commissioned officer of the United States Air Force collided with them. Sarafis was killed and his wife injured.

George V. Allen, the then United States Ambassador to Greece, ordered the airman to be handed over to the Greek authorities for trial. The airman admitted to having been driving under the influence and having violated the speed limit. He was charged with manslaughter. However fellow politicians of the United Democratic Left (and his wife Marion) strongly suspected the incident to be a "premeditated murder" and reported their suspicions to the press.
