= International Socialist Congress, Copenhagen 1910 =

Eighth congress of the Second International

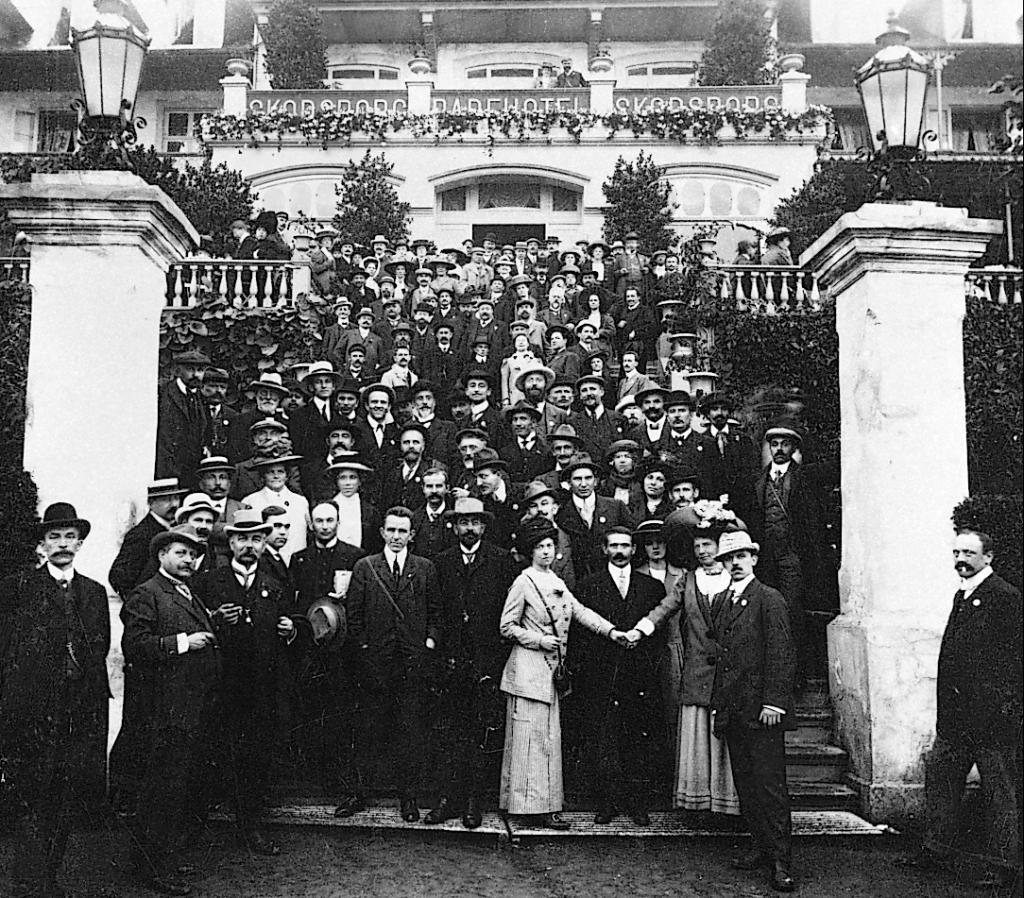
Attendees of the International Socialist Congress

The International Socialist Congress was held at Skodsborg Spa Hotel just north of Copenhagen, Denmark, from 28 August to 3 September 1910. It was the eighth congress of the Second International. Eight hundred and eighty seven delegates attended, representing countries in Europe, North and South America, South Africa and Australia. The Second International Conference of Socialist Women, held prior to opening of Congress, set International Women's Day for March 8 every year.

The agenda for the International Congress at Copenhagen was the following:

1. Relations between Co-operative Organisations and Political Parties
2. Unemployment
3. Arbitration and Disarmament
4. International results of Labour Legislation
5. International Protest against Capital Punishment
6. Steps to ensure the Carrying Out of Resolutions of Congress
7. Organisation of International Solidarity
8. Resolutions on other questions.

Five committees were set up for preliminary discussion and drafting of resolutions on various questions: co-operatives, trade unions, international solidarity, and unity of the trade union movement in Austria; the struggle against war; labour legislation and unemployment; miscellaneous, including socialist unity, capital punishment, Finland, Argentina, Persia, etc.

The resolution on the struggle against war — “Arbitration Courts and Disarmament” — confirmed the resolution of the Stuttgart Congress of 1907 on “Militarism and International Conflicts”, which included the amendments motioned by Lenin and Rosa Luxemburg, calling on the socialists of all countries to make use of the economic and political crisis caused by war to overthrow the bourgeoisie. The resolution of the Copenhagen Congress also bound the socialist parties and their representatives in parliaments to demand that their governments reduce armaments, and settle conflicts between states through arbitration courts, and urged the workers of all countries to stage protests against the threat of war.

A significant discussion was the terms under which the affiliated parties would collaborate with co-operatives.

== Attendees ==
- Alexander Anderson
- Kier Hardie
- Jean Jaurès
- Alexandra Kollontai
- Georg Ledebour
- Ramsay Macdonald
- Sime Seruya
- Harry Quelch
- Clara Zetkin
