= Louis de Brouckère =

Belgian socialist journalist, politician and academic

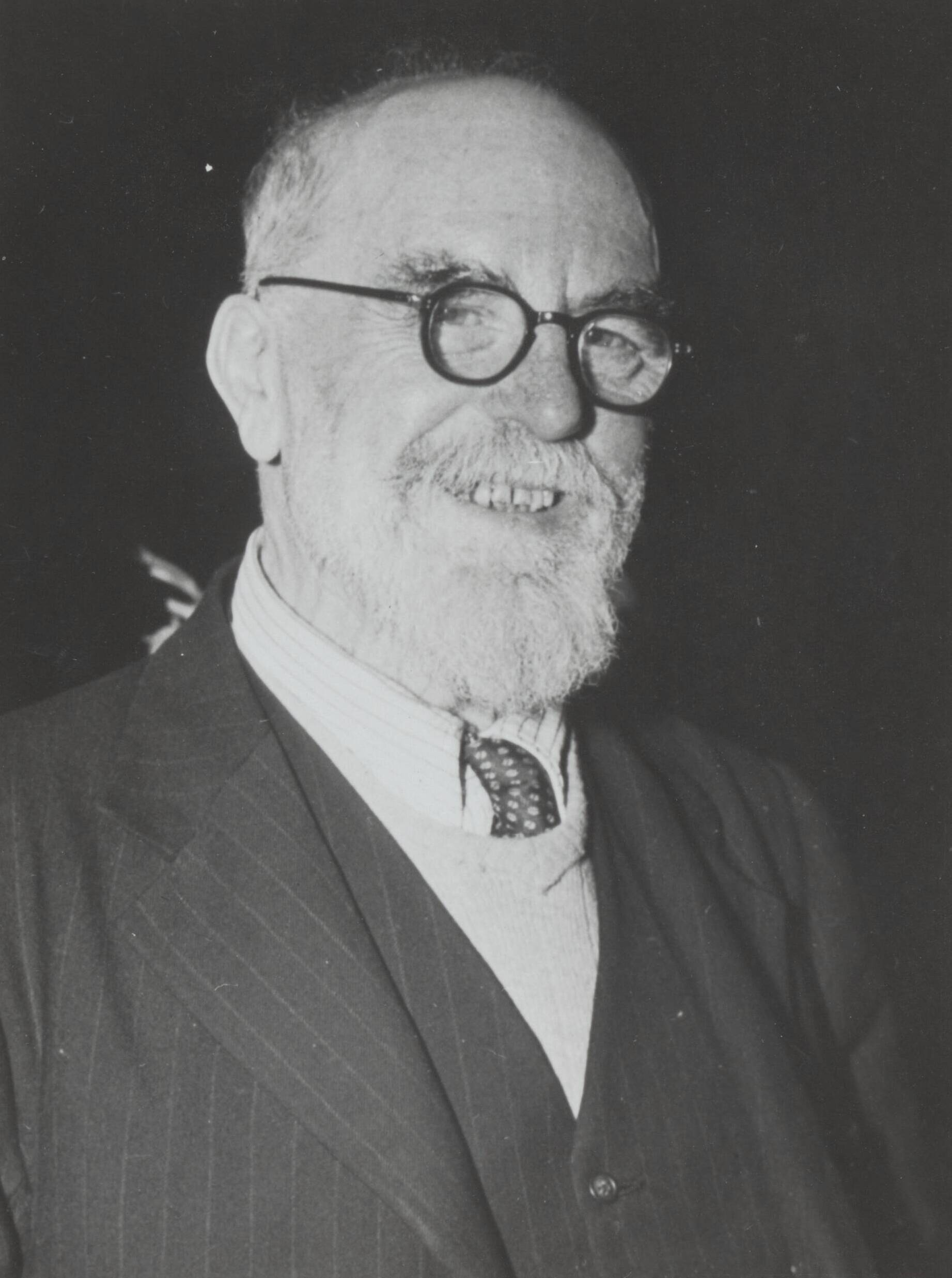
- Louis de Brouckère in 1946
- Born: 31 May 1870; Roeselare West Flanders, Belgium
- Died: 4 June 1951 (aged 81); Brussels, Belgium
- Education: Free University of Brussels
- Occupations: Writer, economist, lawyer, university professor
- Political party: Belgian Labor Party; Belgian Socialist Party
- Children: Lucia de Brouckère

Louis de Brouckère (31 May 1870 – 4 June 1951) was a Belgian socialist journalist, politician and academic. He was a member of the Belgian Labour Party from the 1890s.

== Biography ==
Born in the family of a liberal-minded industrialist, in high school he became involved in the workers' movement. Initially a Proudhonian activist, he later embraced Marxism. He was a member of the Belgian Labour Party (BWP) from its founding in which he did actively collaborate in social democratic newspapers: his first articles in the socialist newspaper Le Peuple (The People) were published in 1891, and in 1906 he became her editor. In March 1896, he was imprisoned for six months for anti-militarist propaganda. He was elected to the local council in Brussels in 1898, and then to the provincial council in Brabant a year later. In 1894 he was a founding member of the New University of Brussels.

On the 75th anniversary of Belgian independence, de Brouckère and his comrades decided to boycott the celebrations, denouncing the domination of the bourgeois class at the expense of the proletariat. In 1911, he published an article in the SPD magazine Die Neue Zeit, in which he criticized his party's leadership for opportunism.

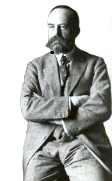
De Brouckère in 1917

De Brouckère attended the Stuttgart Congress of the Second International. Here he moved a resolution in which he argued that there should be parity of status between party and unions. He said they should share a commitment to the socialist education of the working class. However Karl Kautsky brokered a compromise resolution in which the parties and the unions "had an equally important task to perform in the struggle for proletarian emancipation," with the domain of each logically separated and independent of the other.

A staunch opponent of militarism, Brouckère abandoned his former views at the outbreak of World War I, voluntarily entering the army as a social patriot. As a colleague and close friend of his fellow party member Emile Vandervelde, he became the head of his office in 1917. On behalf of the General Council, the BWP made a trip to the countries of the Entente, agitating for the continuation of the war. He and other Social Democrats visited Russia after the February Revolution (1917), urging Alexander Kerensky's Provisional Government not to withdraw from the war.

In 1919 he became an adviser to the government, and four years later he was appointed a senator. Formerly a member of the International Socialist Bureau of the Second International, he held leadership positions in the Labour and Socialist International and the BWP between the two world wars. He took part in the work of the League of Nations and its Preparatory Commission for Disarmament as an official representative of Belgium. Since 1920, he demanded that Germany be allowed to join the League, as well as to reduce the reparations imposed on it.

With the outbreak of World War II, he signed the Liege Manifesto in 1939, which rejected the policy of Belgian neutrality and instead called for cooperation with France against Nazi Germany. After the invasion of Germany he was in exile, going through Paris to London. From 1939 to 1944 he was one of the employees of the Belgian government-in-exile in London under the Catholic Prime Minister Hubert Pierlot and Socialist Foreign Minister Paul-Henri Spaak.

After the liberation of Belgium from the Nazi occupation, he actively participated in the restoration of the BWP, dissolved in 1940, under the new name of the Belgian Socialist Party. Together with Paul van Zeeland, he developed the concept of a Western European economic and monetary union, made a significant contribution to the creation of the Benelux Customs Union on 5 September 1944, which entered into force on 1 January 1948. He was also instrumental in negotiating the Benelux Treaty of 3 February 1958, under which the Benelux Economic Union was founded. In the international arena, he advocated the creation of the Socialist International.

He was a member of the Hague Academy of International Law.
