= Berne International =

Defunct socialist international organisation

- Secretary: Camille Huysmans
- Founded: February 5, 1919; 107 years ago
- Dissolved: May 21, 1923; 103 years ago
- Preceded by: Second International
- Succeeded by: Labour and Socialist International
- Ideology: Social democracy Democratic socialism Anti-Bolshevism
- Political position: Left-wing
- International affiliation: Second International (formal)
- Colors: Red

The Berne International, by its opponents also known as the Yellow International, was a Socialist International formed in Bern, Switzerland 3–9 February 1919. Its goal was to re-establish the Second International. However it did not support world revolution and rejected involvement with the Communist International.

== History ==
The initiative grew out of the failure of a group of social democratic parties to hold a conference in Stockholm in 1917.

Hjalmar Branting rejected any role for the dictatorship of the proletariat arguing it could not lead to socialism. Karl Kautsky and Eduard Bernstein urged the conference to condemn the Bolsheviks and their seizure of power in Russia. Branting moved a resolution which supported the ideology of bourgeois democracy and greeted the revolution in Soviet Russia, but which also denounced the dictatorship of the proletariat. Whilst this gained much support, a group of delegates led by Friedrich Adler and Jean Longuet proposed a resolution calling on the conference to avoid taking a definite stand on Soviet Russia, as there was a lack of information about the situation there. To remedy this they proposed that a commission should be sent to Russia to study the economic and political situation there so that the question of Bolshevism could be discussed at the next Congress.

The commission was to be led by Adler, Kautsky, and Rudolf Hilferding. The Soviet regime agreed to admit the commission, but in return requested the admittance of the Soviet commission to those countries whose representatives were on the Bern commission. The Soviet government received no reply to this request and the commission proposed at the conference never visited Russia.

== Conferences ==
| Event | Location | Date | Notes |
|---|---|---|---|
| Berne Conference of 1919 | Bern | 3–8 February 1919 | |
| International Socialist Conference, Lucerne, 1919 | Lucerne | 1–9 August 1919 | |
| International Socialist Congress, Geneva, 1920 | Geneva | 31 July – 4 August 1920 | Scheduled for February 1920, it was actually convened on 31 July. Sidney Webb as committee chairman drafted a resolution entitled "Political System of Socialism", that distanced the Second International from Leninism, but emphasized it was "ever more urgent that Labour should assume power in society". It also moved the Secretariat from Brussels to London and set the "next congress of the Second International in 1922", but this did not take place. |

== Affiliates ==
=== Participants ===
- Armenian Revolutionary Federation
- Belgian Labour Party
- Estonian Social Democratic Workers' Party
- Latvian Social Democratic Workers' Party
- Labour Party (UK)
- Social Democratic Party of Germany
- Social Democratic Workers' Party (Netherlands)
- Social Democratic Federation
- Social Democratic Party of Georgia
- Social Democratic Party of Lithuania
- Czechoslovak Social Democratic Workers' Party
- German Social Democratic Workers' Party in the Czechoslovak Republic
- Swedish Social Democratic Party

=== Observers ===
- Czechoslovak Socialist Party
- Socialist Revolutionary Party

== See also ==
- International Socialist Commission
- Labour and Socialist International
