= International Socialist Congress, Stuttgart 1907 =

7th Congress of the Socialist International

Image of the old Stuttgart Liederhalle, site of the 1907 International Socialist Congress.

The International Socialist Congress, Stuttgart 1907 was the Seventh Congress of the Second International. The gathering was held in Stuttgart, Germany from 18 to 24 August 1907 and was attended by nearly 900 delegates from around the globe. The work of the congress dealt largely with matters of militarism, colonialism, and women's suffrage and marked an attempt to centrally coordinate the policies of the various socialist parties of the world on these issues.

== History ==
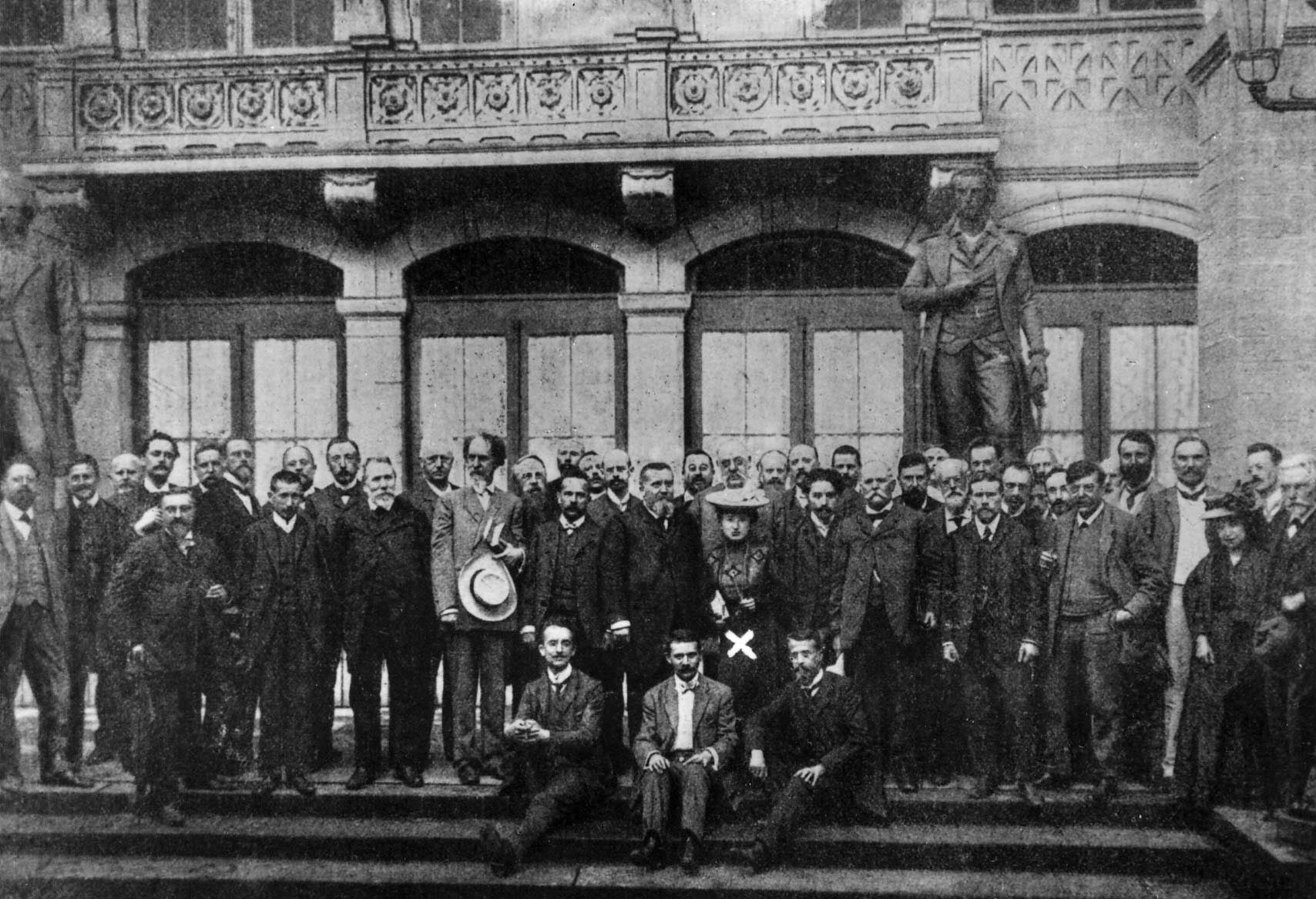
Delegates to the 1907 International Socialist Congress in Stuttgart, Germany

=== Convocation ===
The 1907 Congress of the Second International was convened on Sunday, 18 August 1907 at the Liederhalle of Stuttgart, Germany. There were a total of 886 delegates in attendance, representing the socialist parties of more than 25 nations, making it the largest such gathering in the history of the international socialist movement. The Congress was the seventh international conclave held by the Second International and the first since the Amsterdam Congress, which met three years earlier.

Temporary chairman of the Congress was Paul Singer, who after welcoming the delegates turned the floor over to Emile Vandervelde of the International Socialist Bureau for a keynote speech which served as the formal opening of the gathering.

Sunday night was occupied with a mass propaganda meeting, held at the Stuttgart Volksfestplatz, a large open area located on the banks of the Neckar River about a mile from the center of the city. For two hours prior to the start of the meeting a mass of humanity streamed into this military drill grounds, with the total crowd reaching between 50,000 and 100,000 people. The gathering was addressed by a series of leading orators of the international socialist movement and was held without incident.

The formal work of the Congress began the morning of 19 August following another significant address, this delivered by veteran German socialist August Bebel. Bebel's keynote address dealt with a country-by-country report on the progress of the international socialist movement. Following Bebel's speech, a report on the work of the International Socialist Bureau — the permanent executive structure of the Second International — was delivered by the International Secretary, Camille Huysmans of Belgium.

The actual work of the Congress was conducted in five select committees: Militarism, Colonialism, Woman Suffrage, Immigration, and the Relation of Trade Unions and Political Parties. Each country had the right to seat four of its members on each committee. This resulted in a set of large groups, likened by American delegate A. M. Simons to "miniature Congresses," and made for a slow and methodical pace of work. Each speech was delivered in three languages, German, French, and English — the original plus two translations.

=== Resolution on Militarism ===
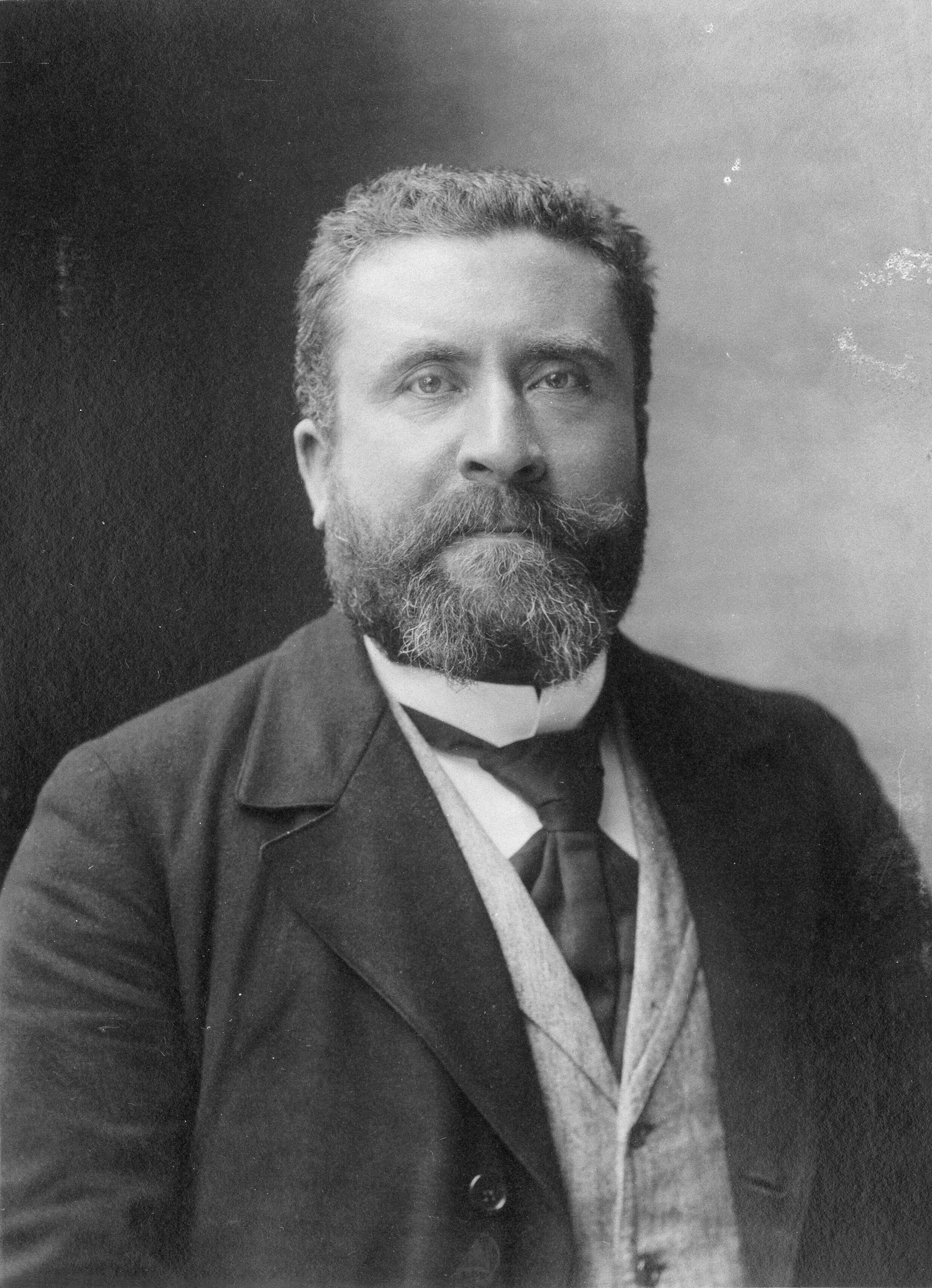
French delegate Jean Jaurès, co-author of a radical minority draft resolution which called for general strike and armed uprising in the event of war.

The main agenda item of the 1907 Congress was the construction of a unified policy to deal with what was seen as the growing menace of "militarism and international conflicts". Debate on the matter was held for five consecutive days in the commission named to decide the question, with a sixth day of debate taking place on the floor of the Congress. This was the most hotly contested topic of discussion, called by one observer "a royal battle, into which the European countries sent their best representatives".

In the Militarism Commission there were three competing resolutions presented, including two by the French delegation and one by the German. The majority French draft noted the right of the working class to defend its national sovereignty in the event of invasion and proclaimed that war would cease only with the elimination of capitalism and its inherent need for the expansion of markets and the construction of military machine to bolster the territorial designs of the various nations.

In contrast the majority French and German draft resolutions stood a third perspective held by Jean Jaurès and Édouard Vaillant, which called for the working class to fight war through "every means available, from parliamentary intervention and public agitation to the general strike and the armed uprising" — brazen language deemed "impossible and undiscussible" in German conditions by representatives of the recently legalized German Social-Democratic Party (SPD).

This tense domestic situation faced by the SPD was accented by the expulsion of British delegate Harry Quelch by German authorities during the course of the Congress. Quelch, editor of the London socialist newspaper Justice, had referred to the 1907 Hague Peace Conference as a "thieves' supper" during the course of debate in Stuttgart. The government had taken offense to the insulting reference and had instructed Quelch to withdraw his statement or exit Germany within 8 hours. Faced with the choice, Quelch refused to accede to government pressure and he returned to London, where he was met at the train station with an ovation for his refusal to yield.

After protracted debate suitable language was agreed upon for passage of a resolution by the Congress. War was declared to be the end product of the competition of capitalist nations in the world market, bolstered by "national prejudices systematically cultivated in the interests of the ruling classes". The resolution called for the replacement of standing armies by the democratic organization of "the armed people" — which, it was claimed, "would prove an effective means for making aggressive wars impossible". In the event of imminent war, the working class was mildly beseeched to "do all they can to prevent the breaking out of this war, using for the purpose the means which appear to them most efficacious". Should war nevertheless follow, the socialists were "bound to intervene for its being brought to a speedy end" and to make use of the economic and political crises created by the war "to hasten the breakdown of the predominance of the capitalist class".

=== Resolution on Colonialism ===
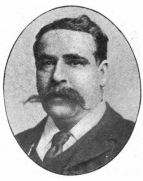
British delegate Harry Quelch, expelled by the German government for making unflattering reference to the 1907 Hague Peace Conference as a "thieves' dinner."

The 1904 Amsterdam Congress instructed the various national socialist parties with which it was affiliated to form study groups in an effort to resolve the International's position towards the increasingly dynamic struggle of the various nations for control of colonial possessions around the world. A protracted period of discussion had followed and when the regularly scheduled August 1907 International Socialist Congress was convened in Stuttgart, Germany during the third week of August 1907, it was met with lengthy reports on the colonial policies of Great Britain, France, the Netherlands, and Belgium, each written by the respective socialist parties of these countries.

A lengthy and divisive debate on the colonial question followed, occupying three full days of the Congress's time. One day of debate in commission produced a majority resolution which offered a carefully measured rejection of colonialism, while at the same time recognizing the inevitability of the opening of undeveloped nations for economic development and, by extension, exploitation. Unsatisfied by this attempt to simultaneously reject colonialism in principle while acknowledging its inevitability in practice, deep divisions emerged among the delegations of the major colonial powers, including Great Britain, Germany, France, and Italy. A left wing, which included Karl Kautsky, Harry Quelch, and Julian Marchlewski (Karski), argued that a socialist colonial policy was a contradiction of terms and that the moderate resolution touted by Eduard Bernstein, H. H. van Kol, and Eduard David effectively endorsed external rule by force of colonial peoples.

After protracted debate on the floor of the Congress the majority resolution out of committee was set aside in favor of a new resolution which declared that "capitalist colonial policies" must inevitably "give rise to servitude, forced labour, and the extermination of the native peoples," while only the achievement of socialism would make possible "peaceful cultural development" and the prospect of developing "the world's mineral resources in the interests of the whole of humanity". Whatever fundamental differences in perspective existed among the delegates were thus papered over with utopian prose; the new colonial resolution was adopted unanimously.

=== Resolution on Women's Suffrage ===
A matter of little controversy was the International Socialist Congress's endorsement of woman suffrage, an idea advanced simultaneously in Stuttgart by a parallel First International Conference of Socialist Women — a gathering held simultaneously in the same building. The Socialist Congress seconded the suffrage demands of the Socialist Women's Conference, with its resolution declaring it "the duty of Socialist Parties of all countries to agitate most energetically for the introduction of universal women's suffrage". While the resolution acknowledged that the International had no authority to dictate the launch of a suffrage campaign in any country, it nevertheless emphatically emphasized that whenever such a campaign was launched, socialists should proceed on the "general Social Democratic lines of universal adult suffrage without distinction, and nothing else".

=== Resolution on Immigration ===
With respect to immigration, the Socialist International felt pressure from the trade union movement to opine in favor of tight immigration restrictions which would reduce the ability of employers to make use of low cost newcomers in place of established union workers. The ultimate resolution did not go far in catering to such a demand, however, condemning the importation from abroad of strikebreakers or those previously entering into restrictive employment contracts, but insisting that unions not only admit immigrant workmen but do so on the basis of reasonable initiation fees and dues structures. This position proved acceptable to the radical foes of conservative craft unions and their "narrow, petty-bourgeois" agenda, such as Russian delegate V. I. Lenin, who asserted in no uncertain terms that the resolution adopted "fully meets the demands of revolutionary Social-Democracy".

=== Socialist Parties and Trade Unions ===
The Congress attempted to address the sometimes uneasy tension between the political and economic arms of the workers movement by defining the relationship between the Socialist Parties and the trade unions of the various nations of the world. Louis de Brouckère had moved a resolution in which he argued that there should be parity of status between party and unions. He said they should share a commitment to the socialist education of the working class. However Karl Kautsky brokered a compromise resolution in which the parties and the unions "had an equally important task to perform in the struggle for proletarian emancipation," with the domain of each logically separated and independent of the other. Expressing the belief that only a combined economic and political effort would be sufficient for the liberation of the working class, pious wishes for close cooperation were made in the resolution, echoing the declarations of previous International Socialist Congresses.

=== Other resolutions ===
In addition to its major statements on militarism, immigration, the relationship of the socialist and trade union movements, colonialism, and women's suffrage, the 1907 Stuttgart Congress passed a handful of more specialized resolutions. The delegates approved declarations disapproving the invasion of Morocco by French and Spanish forces, expressed sympathy with the defeated revolutionary movement in the Russian Revolution of 1905, and formally condemned the "unlawful methods" employed by American mineowners in an effort to legally hang radical union leader William D. "Big Bill" Haywood. The delegates also condemned the actions of the government of Romania in using lethal violence in an effort to stamp out a mass peasant revolt in Moldavia and Wallachia.

== Prominent delegates ==
Austria

- Victor Adler
- Valentino Pittoni
- Adelheid Popp

Belgium

- Emile Vandervelde
- Louis de Brouckère

France

- Jules Guesde
- Gustave Hervé
- Jean Jaurès
- Édouard Vaillant

Germany

- August Bebel
- Eduard Bernstein
- Eduard David
- Hugo Haase
- Karl Kautsky
- Karl Liebknecht
- Rosa Luxemburg
- Franz Mehring
- Paul Singer
- Clara Zetkin

Great Britain

- Henry Hyndman
- Ramsay MacDonald
- Harry Quelch
- George Bernard Shaw

India

- Bhikaiji Cama
- Virendranath Chattopadhyaya
- Hemchandra Kanungo

Italy

- Amilcare Cipriani
- Enrico Ferri

Netherlands

- Henri van Kol

Ottoman Empire

- Yitzhak Ben-Zvi
- Israel Shochat

Romania

- Alecu Constantinescu
- N. D. Cocea
- Christian Rakovsky

Russian Empire

- V. I. Lenin
- Anatoly Lunacharsky
- Maxim Litvinov
- Joseph Stalin

USA

- Frank Bohn
- Louis B. Boudin
- Daniel De Leon
- Fred Heslewood
- Morris Hillquit
- Algernon Lee
- A. M. Simons

== Sources ==
- Braunthal, Julius, ed. (1967). History of the International: Volume 1: 1863-1914. New York: Frederick A. Praeger. ISBN 978-1121956728.
- Klein, Nicholas (1907). "International Socialist Congress". Wilshire's Magazine. 11 (10).
- Lenin, V. I. (20 October 1907a). "The International Socialist Congress in Stuttgart". Proletary. 17.
- Lenin, V. I. (October 1907b). "The International Socialist Congress in Stuttgart". Kalendar Dlya Vsekh.
- Simons, A. M., ed. (1908). "The Stuttgart Congress" (digital). International Socialist Review. 8 (3): 129–144.
