= Second International =

International socialist organization (1889–1914)

Socialist International Second International
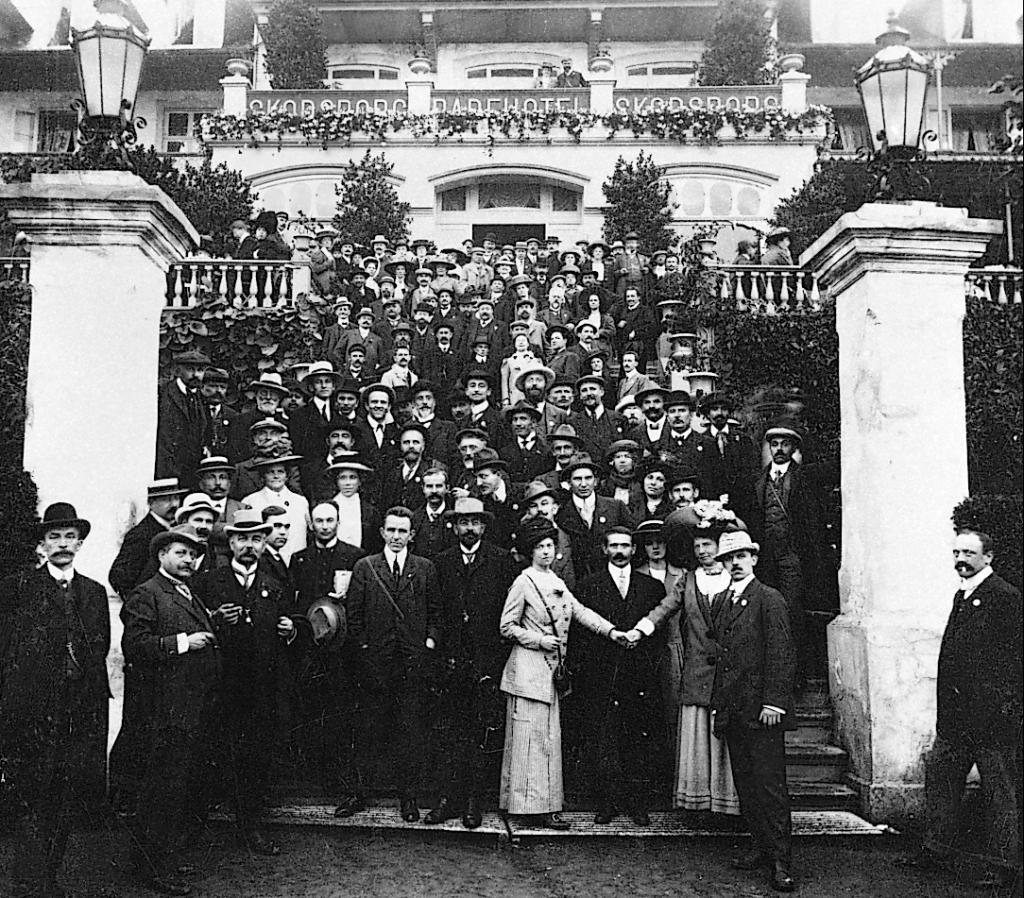
- Delegates at the 1910 Copenhagen Congress
- Governing body: International Socialist Bureau (1900–1914)
- Founded: 14 July 1889
- Dissolved: 4 August 1914 (collapse); 21 May 1923 (formal)
- Preceded by: First International (1876)
- Succeeded by: Zimmerwald movement (1915); Berne International (1919); Communist International (1919); International Working Union of Socialist Parties (1921); Labour and Socialist International (1923)
- Headquarters: Brussels (1900–1914)
- Ideology: Social democracy; Reformist; Revolutionary; Factions: Possibilism; Anarchism (until 1896)
- Political position: Left-wing to far-left
- Anthem: "The Internationale"

The Socialist International, commonly known as the Second International, was a political international of socialist and labour parties formed in Paris in 1889. At a time of growing industrial working-class movements and the expansion of suffrage, it brought together autonomous national parties into a loose international federation. It continued the work of the First International (1864–1876), from which it inherited both the legacy of Karl Marx and the conflict with anarchists. The organization was dominated by the powerful Social Democratic Party of Germany (SPD), whose organizational and theoretical leadership heavily influenced the other member parties.

The International resolved the annual celebration of International Workers' Day on 1 May and popularised the demand for an eight-hour day. Its early congresses were preoccupied with expelling anarchists and defining its mission as one based on parliamentary political action. After 1900, the International was increasingly confronted with the internal divisions of the socialist movement, particularly the rise of revisionist Marxism in Germany and the debate over socialist participation in bourgeois governments, sparked by the Millerand affair in France. The 1904 Amsterdam Congress, which saw a major debate between French socialist Jean Jaurès and German leader August Bebel, condemned "revisionism" and "ministerialism".

From 1905, the prevention of war became the International's central task, and it came to be seen as the world's most important anti-militarist political force. At the congresses of Stuttgart (1907), Copenhagen (1910), and Basel (1912), it passed increasingly urgent resolutions calling for international working-class action, including strikes, to stop the outbreak of war. However, the International was powerless to stop the crisis of July 1914. Following the assassination of its most charismatic anti-war leader, Jaurès, its major member parties—including those in Germany, France, Austria, and Great Britain—rallied to support their respective nations' efforts in World War I, precipitating the International's collapse.

The schism between its pro-war majority and its anti-war minority, which organised the Zimmerwald Conference, prefigured the post-war split between social democracy and communism. Post-war attempts to revive the organisation at the Berne International conference of 1919 were unsuccessful, as many parties refused to rejoin what they saw as a discredited body. The Second International was succeeded by the Communist International (Comintern or Third International), founded in 1919, and the Labour and Socialist International, formed in 1923 by a merger of the Berne International and the International Working Union of Socialist Parties.

== Background ==
By the 1880s, the political and economic climate of Europe was shifting away from the mid-century dominance of liberal political economy. The Long Depression of the 1870s spurred a return to protectionism, exemplified by Germany's tariffs of 1879. Rapid industrialisation, especially in Germany, created a new urban proletariat and brought the "social question" to the forefront of public discussion. The expansion of suffrage in countries like Germany and France, and its extension in Britain in 1884, made it possible for mass political parliamentary parties representing the working class to emerge. As trade unions grew in strength and purpose, organised socialism evolved from a set of doctrines held by theorists into the creed of these new mass parties.

The legacy of the First International, which had split apart in 1872 (with one formally dissolving in 1876, and the majority of federations leaving for the anti-authoritarian International which in turn mostly faded) had awakened Europe to the possibility of international working-class action and had endowed the idea of "The International" with a potent, if partly mythical, revolutionary tradition. Several unsuccessful attempts had been made to create a unified all-socialist organization during the late 1870s and 1880s, notably at congresses in Ghent in 1877. An attempt to found a new International Chur, Switzerland, in October 1881. The Chur congress acknowledged that the time was not yet ripe for a formal relaunch, concluding that strong and properly organised national parties were essential preliminaries to the revival of the International upon a stable foundation.

=== German Social Democratic Party ===
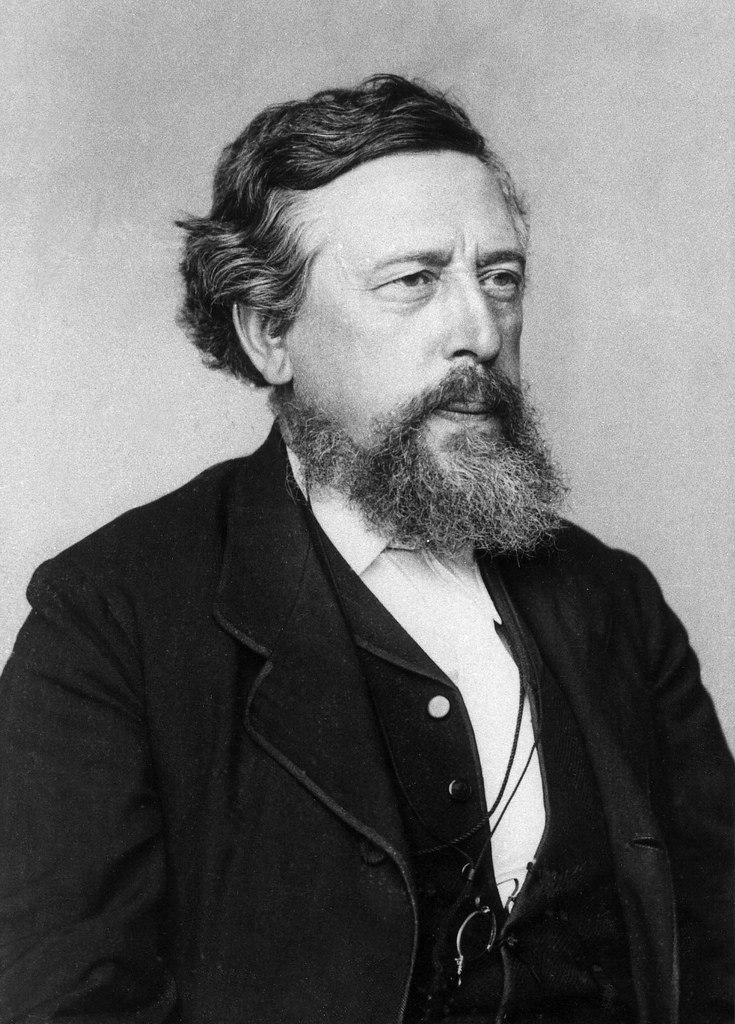
Wilhelm Liebknecht

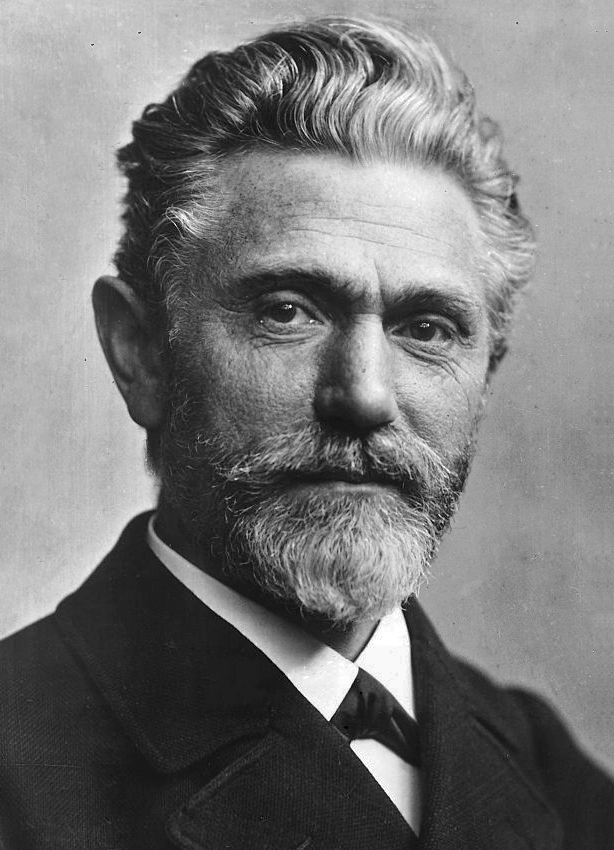
August Bebel

The strongest and most influential socialist party in the world was the Social Democratic Party of Germany (SPD). Founded in 1875 at the Gotha Congress through a merger of Marxist "Eisenacher" and Lassallean groups, it established a mass political organisation with its own doctrine, leaders, and voter base. The party was led by Wilhelm Liebknecht, a friend of Karl Marx exiled after the 1848 revolutions, and August Bebel, a woodturner who became the party's chief organiser and orator.

In 1878, Otto von Bismarck's government passed the Anti-Socialist Laws, which banned socialist meetings, associations, and newspapers. The persecution, which lasted until 1890, ultimately strengthened the party. Its leaders gained prestige as martyrs, and its organisation was forced to become more disciplined. During this period, 1,300 publications were suppressed and 1,500 party activists were sentenced to a total of 1,000 years' imprisonment. Despite this, the party's vote grew from 312,000 in 1881 to 763,000 in 1887. By 1890, when the laws expired, the SPD had thirty-five seats in the Reichstag and received nearly 1.5 million votes. The SPD's combination of Marxist revolutionary rhetoric and practical, law-abiding political activity created a model that was widely admired and emulated by emerging socialist parties across Europe, including in Austria, Belgium, and Switzerland.

=== Socialism in other countries ===
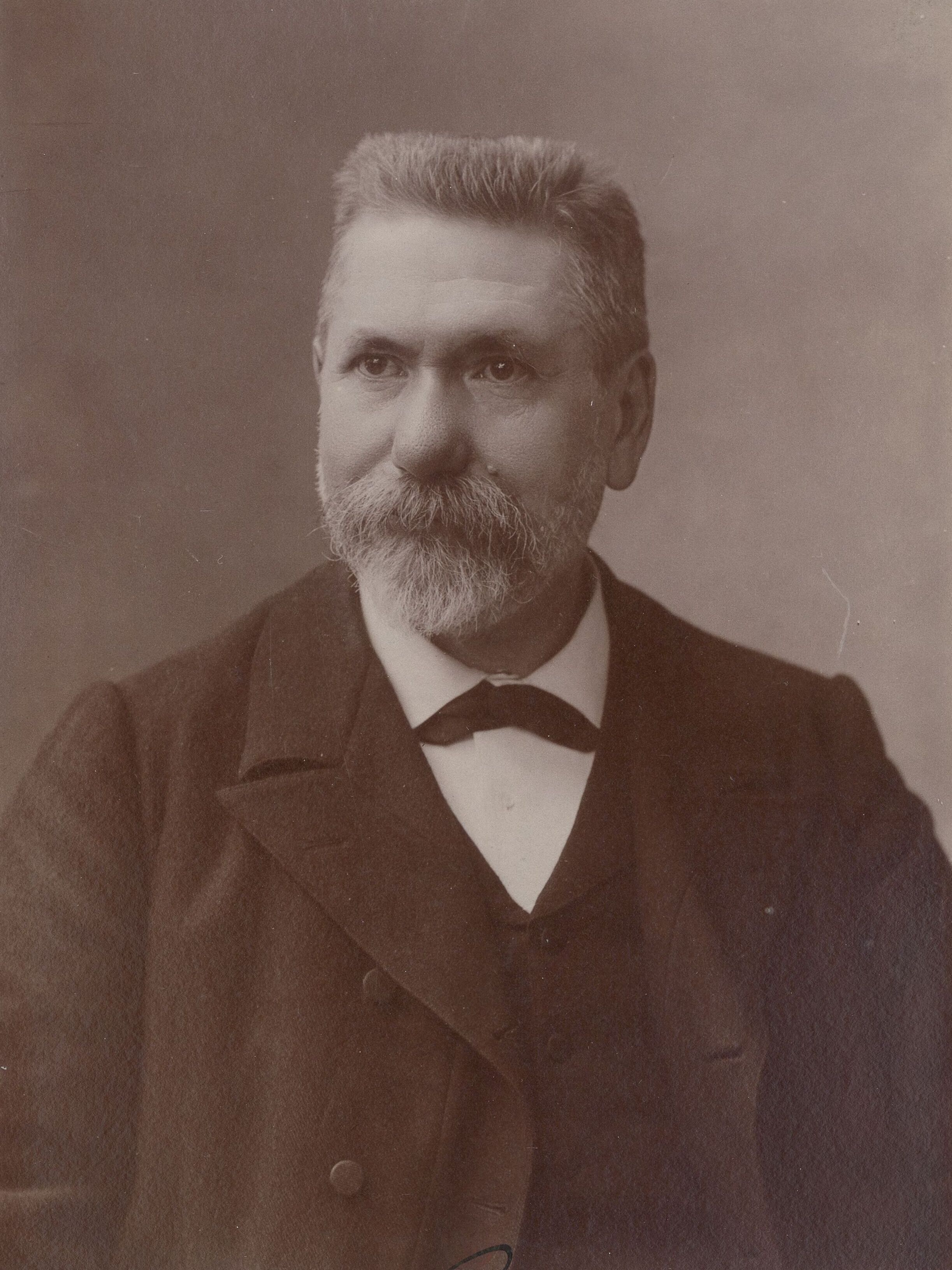
Édouard Vaillant

In France, the socialist movement was more divided, drawing on diverse and sometimes conflicting traditions: the utopianism of Charles Fourier, the insurrectionism of Auguste Blanqui, the anarchism of Pierre-Joseph Proudhon, and the Marxism imported by Jules Guesde. The brutal suppression of the Paris Commune in 1871 had shattered the French working-class movement, which only began to revive in the late 1870s. In 1879, Guesde's Marxist group founded the French Workers' Party (POF). They were soon challenged by the "Possibilists" led by Paul Brousse, who advocated for gradual municipal reforms and were deeply suspicious of Marx's attempts to dictate doctrine from London. Other factions, such as the Blanquists under Édouard Vaillant, and later the Allemanists and independent socialists around Benoît Malon, added to the disunity.

In Great Britain, the predictions of Marxist theory were not being realised. The class struggle was muted, and the trade unions were focused on collective bargaining rather than independent political representation. Small Marxist groups existed, such as Henry Hyndman's Social Democratic Federation and William Morris's Socialist League, but the most significant contribution to socialist thought came from the non-Marxist Fabian Society, founded in 1884, which promoted a philosophy of gradual reform derived from the utilitarian tradition. The 1889 London dock strike marked a turning point, ushering in an era of "new unionism" among unskilled workers and increasing socialist influence in the trade unions. In 1888, the Scottish miner Keir Hardie founded the Scottish Labour Party, marking an early step toward independent labour representation in Parliament.

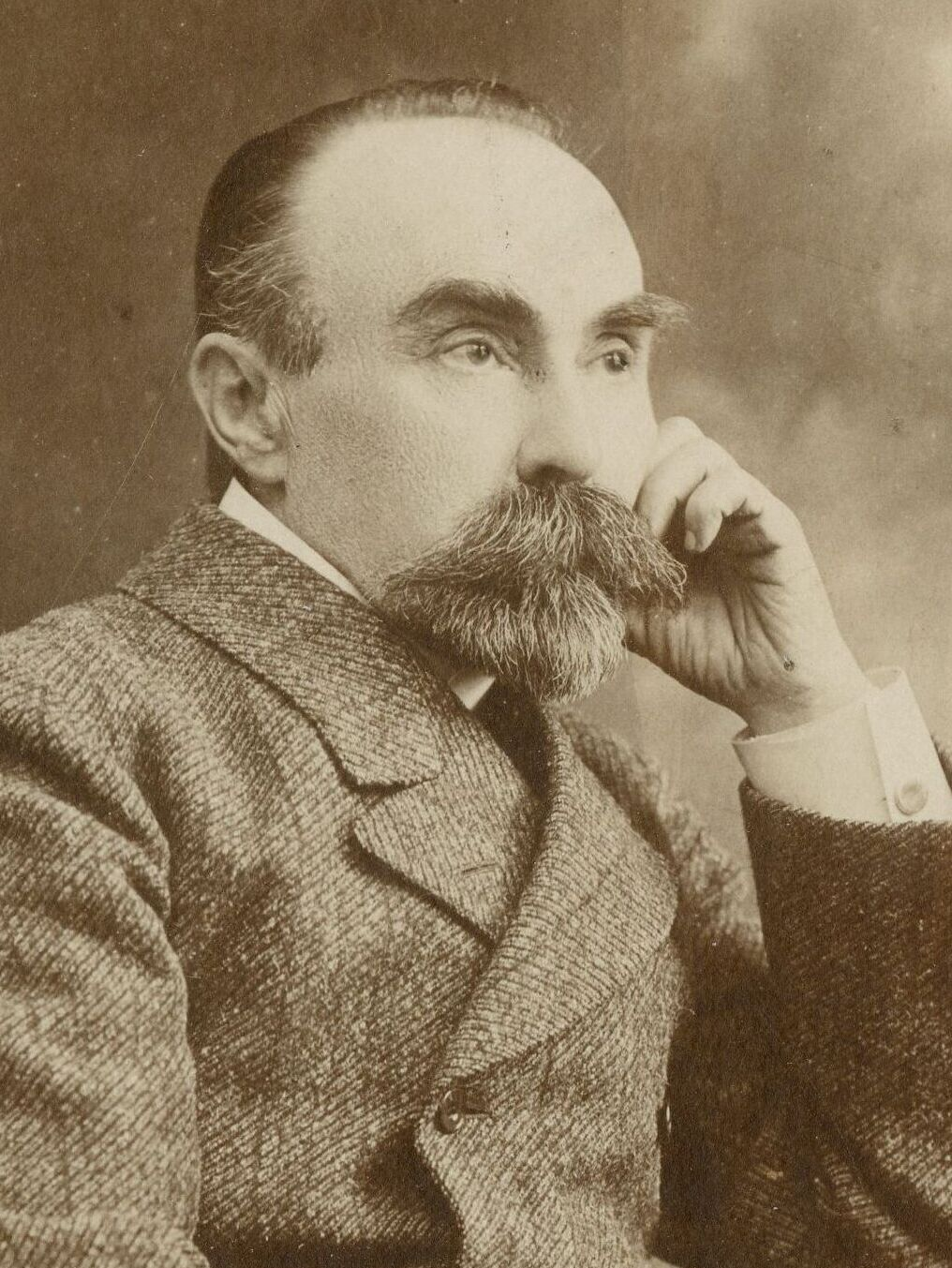
Georgi Plekhanov

In Russia, autocratic rule genrally made a mass movement impossible. The revolutionary movement was composed of small groups of exiles who debated doctrine and tactics, primarily in Switzerland. Following the assassination of Tsar Alexander II in 1881, revolutionary thinkers split between those who favoured terrorism and those who looked to the peasantry. A third way emerged in 1883 when Georgi Plekhanov, Vera Zasulich, and Pavel Axelrod founded the Marxist "Emancipation of Labour" group. They argued that Russia must follow the path of Western Europe, developing a capitalist economy and an industrial proletariat that would form the basis for a future socialist revolution.

Anarchist ideas, stemming from Mikhail Bakunin's influence in the First International, remained a powerful force, particularly in Spain and Italy, and competed everywhere with the model of Marxist parties.

== Formation (1889) ==
The revival of international socialism was closely tied to the growing movement for an eight-hour day. This demand originated in the United States and Australia in the 1850s and was taken up by French socialists in the 1880s, who saw international labour legislation as its primary goal. The centenary of the French Revolution in 1889, celebrated with a great exhibition in Paris, provided a natural occasion for a new international socialist congress. However, the divisions within the French socialist movement led to the convocation of two rival congresses. The Possibilists, led by Brousse, collaborating with the British Trades Union Congress (TUC), organised a congress that met in the Rue de Lancry. The Marxists, led by Guesde and supported by Liebknecht and the SPD, held their own congress in the Salle Petrelle.

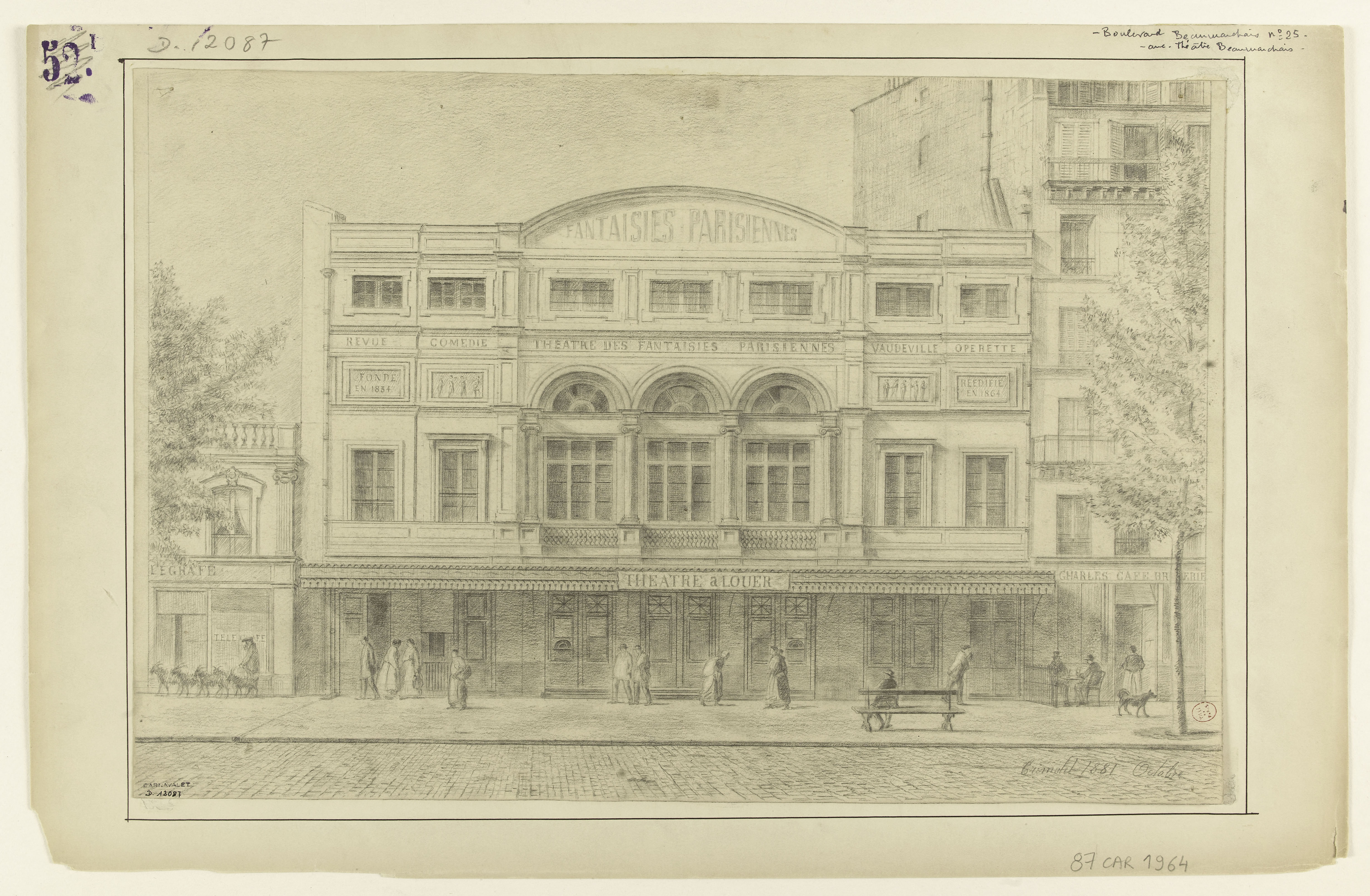
The Théâtre des Fantaisies-Parisiennes in Paris, site of the founding congress of the Second International

Liebknecht and others had hoped for a single, unified congress, but the intransigence of both French factions, and the scepticism of Friedrich Engels, made this impossible. The rivalry between the two meetings was intense and at times chaotic, with delegates drifting between them and anarchists disrupting the proceedings of both. Despite the confusion, the Marxist congress that opened on 14 July 1889 in the Salle Petrelle (soon moved to the Théâtre des Fantaisies-Parisiennes) is considered the founding congress of the Second International. It was attended by nearly 400 delegates from twenty countries and included most of the prominent socialist leaders of Europe. It was a more distinguished gathering than its Possibilist rival, which was dominated by French delegates and included only a few prominent foreign figures like Hyndman.

The delegates saw themselves as heirs to the legacy of the First International; Liebknecht declared that the old International had not died but "passed into the mighty working-class movement", and that the new body was its "offspring". Liebknecht and Vaillant were elected joint presidents, their handshake symbolising the desired solidarity between German and French socialism. Other notable attendees included Bebel, Victor Adler from Austria, Hardie and Morris from Britain, Plekhanov from Russia, and Marx's daughter Eleanor Marx-Aveling and son-in-law Paul Lafargue. The congress was greeted as the "first parliament of the international working class," which had assembled to conclude a "sacred alliance of the international proletariat."

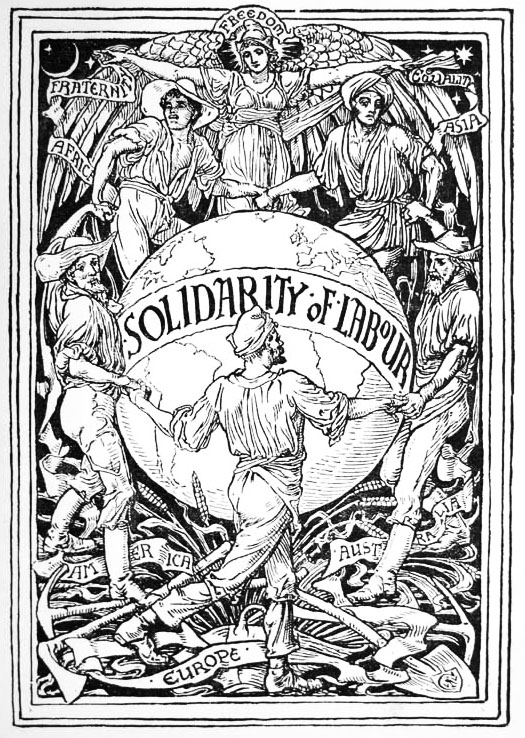
1889 design by Walter Crane celebrating International Workers' Day (May Day)

The congress devoted much of its time to hearing reports on the state of the socialist movement in each country, breaking the isolation that had followed the collapse of the First International. On its final day, it passed a series of important resolutions that would set the agenda for the International for years to come. The most significant of these was the decision to organise "a great international demonstration" on a fixed date to demand an eight-hour working day. The date of 1 May was chosen, adopting a proposal made by the American Federation of Labor in 1888. This established the tradition of May Day as an international workers' holiday. The first such demonstration in 1890 was a major success, with impressive rallies and work stoppages in many European countries. The congress also passed resolutions condemning standing armies in favour of a "people in arms" or popular militia, and affirming that socialists should participate in elections where possible but "without compromising with any other parties". The debates over the implementation of these resolutions, particularly the nature of the May Day demonstration, revealed the deep tactical differences that existed between the member parties from the outset.

== Early congresses and exclusion of anarchists (1890–1896) ==
The first years of the new International were defined by the struggle against the anarchists, whose acts of propaganda of the deed, including assassinations and bombings, captured public attention in the 1890s. While some socialists sympathised with direct action, the official Marxist parties saw this strategy as a threat, both because it invited government repression and because it undermined their focus on organised political action. The question of anarchist participation dominated the first three congresses after the founding meeting.

At the Brussels Congress of 1891, the anarchists were formally excluded. The organisers had invited only those parties and labour organisations that recognised the necessity of political action. The congress made the celebration of May Day an annual event, and, largely on German initiative, added the demand for peace to its central themes. Despite the official exclusion of anarchists, sympathisers including the Dutch socialist Ferdinand Domela Nieuwenhuis attended and argued for revolutionary tactics against war, proposing that any declaration of war be met with a general strike by conscripts. The proposal was overwhelmingly rejected in favour of a resolution by Vaillant and Liebknecht that placed faith in the existing parliamentary and electoral tactics of the socialist parties.

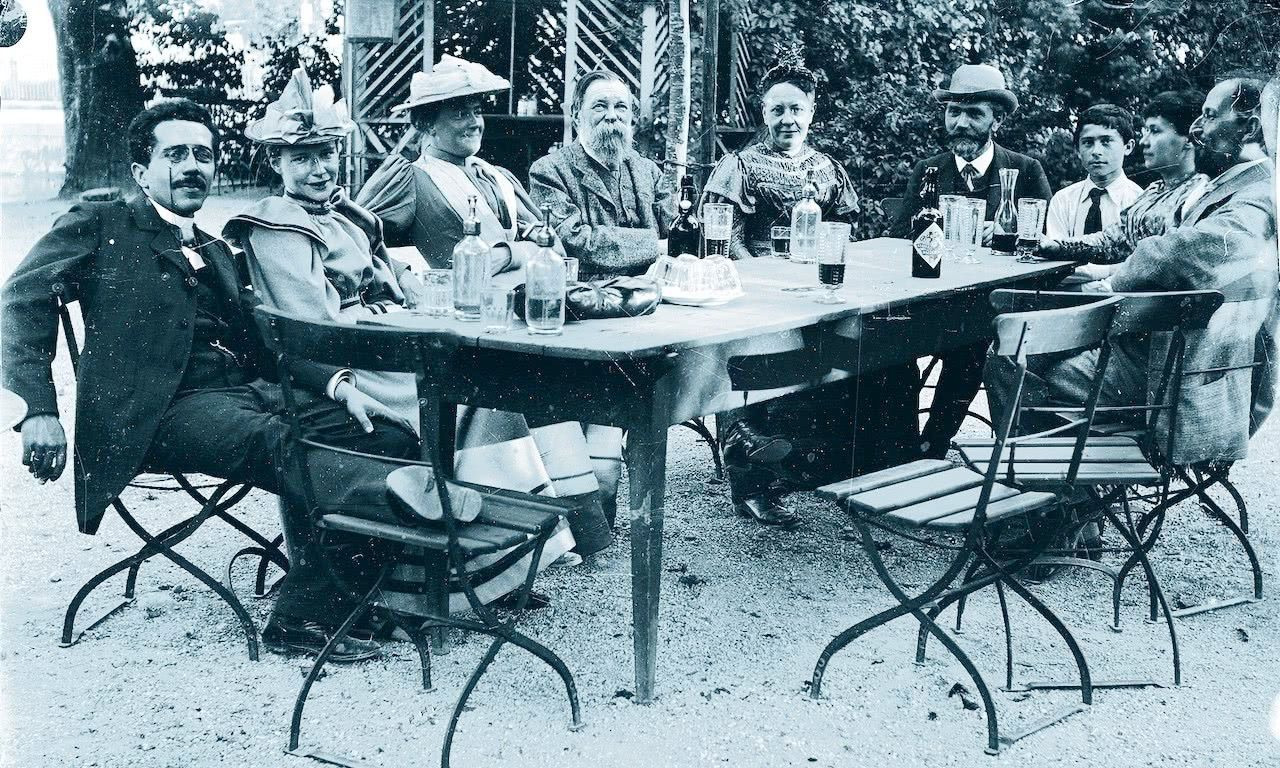
Members of the International at the 1893 Zurich Congress, including Clara Zetkin, Friedrich Engels, August Bebel, and Eduard Bernstein

The conflict escalated at the Zurich Congress of 1893. The proceedings opened with a tumultuous debate over credentials, as a group of German "dissident" socialists and anarchists, including Gustav Landauer, demanded admission. Bebel delivered a vehement speech denouncing them, and a resolution was passed limiting attendance to parties that accepted "political action". This led to chaotic scenes as the anarchists were physically expelled, shouting "We protest!". The resolution stated: "All Trade Unions shall be admitted to the Congress: also those Socialist Parties and Organisations which recognise the necessity of the organisation of the workers and of political action... By 'political action' is meant that the working-class organisations seek, in as far as possible, to use or conquer political rights and the machinery of legislation for the furthering of the interests of the proletariat and the conquest of political power." Among those excluded was the young Rosa Luxemburg, representing a Polish socialist group.

The final showdown occurred at the London Congress of 1896. Anarchists including Landauer and Errico Malatesta again appeared and, after being denied delegate status, disrupted the proceedings from the public galleries. After a long debate, which included a passionate appeal for tolerance from the British trade unionist Tom Mann, the congress reaffirmed the Zurich resolution on political action, making the exclusion of anarchists from the International definitive. Despite this, the composition of the congress remained heterogeneous. The British delegation alone included 159 delegates from trade unions, 121 from the Social Democratic Federation, 117 from the Independent Labour Party (ILP), and 22 from the Fabian Society, among many others. As the Irish observer George Bernard Shaw noted, the consistent expulsion of revolutionary dissidents showed how far the International had moved toward becoming a respectable, and predominantly parliamentary, organisation. This struggle cemented the International's character as a body of organised political parties, setting the stage for the next major internal conflict: the debate over reform versus revolution.

== Reformism and revisionism (1896–1904) ==
With the anarchists excluded, the International became a more coherent but by no means monolithic body. Its growth in size and electoral success forced its member parties to confront a fundamental dilemma: whether to work for revolutionary overthrow of the capitalist system or to seek gradual reforms within it. This tension manifested as "revisionism" in Germany and "ministerialism" in France.

=== Bernstein's revisionism ===
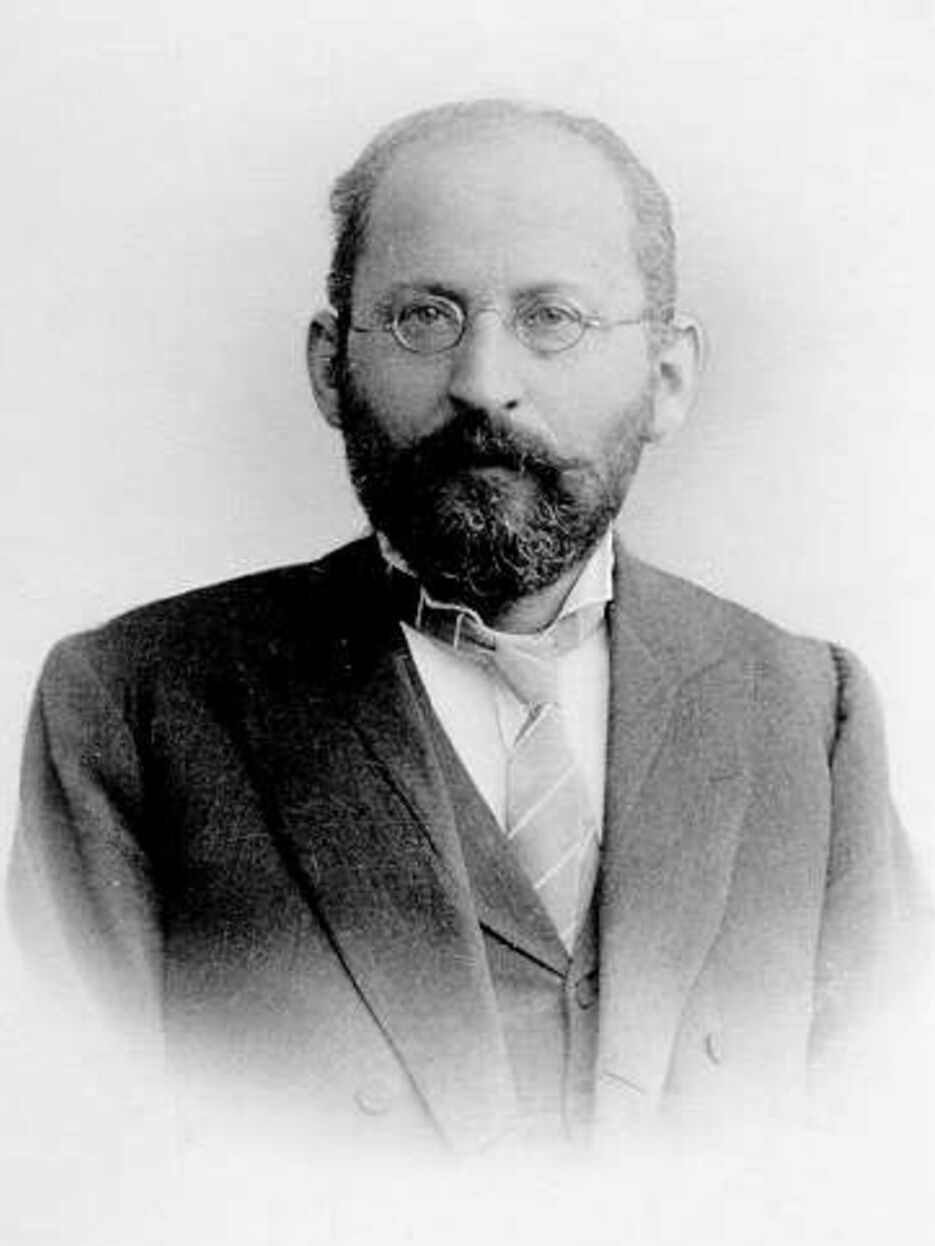
Eduard Bernstein

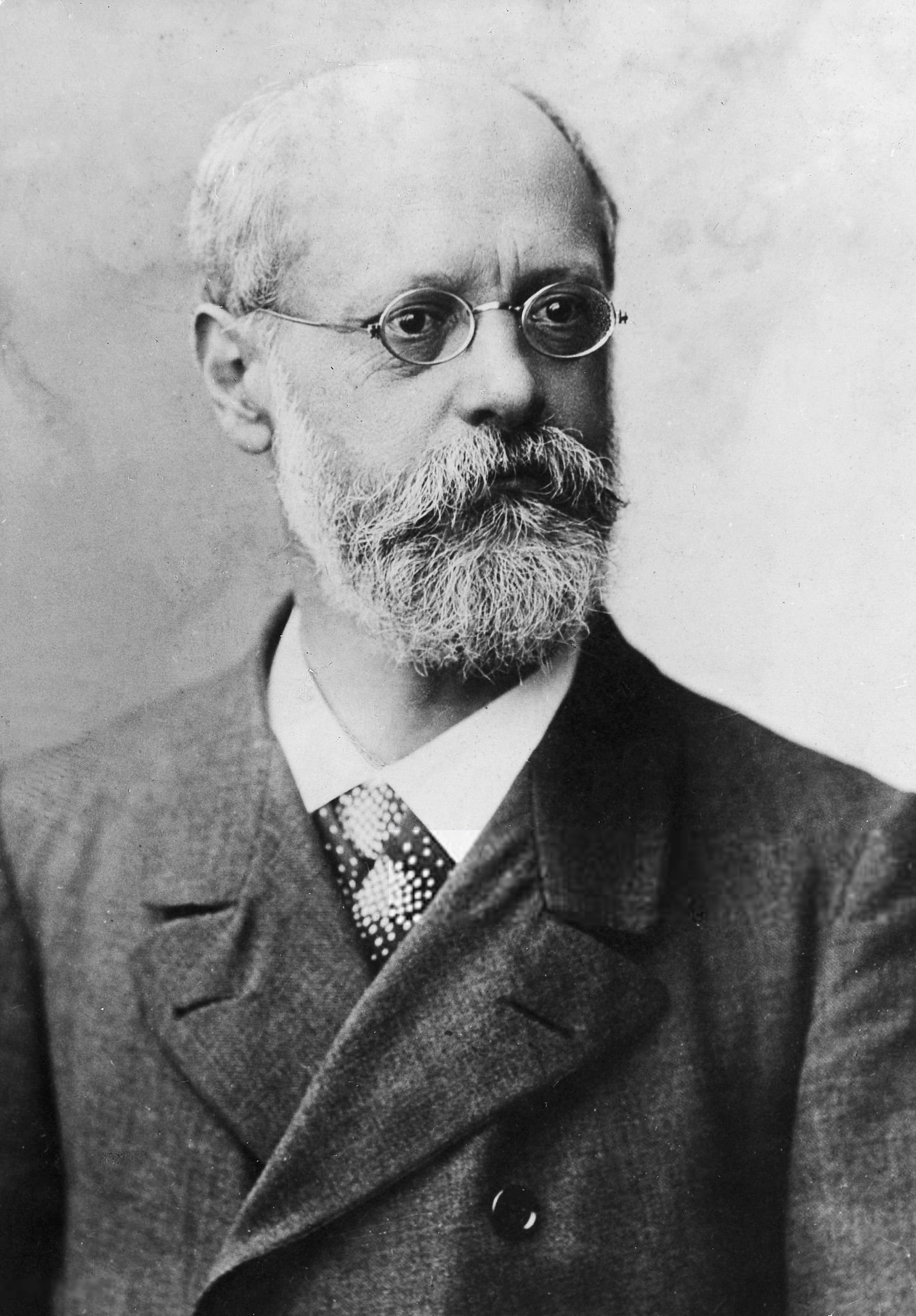
Karl Kautsky

The theoretical challenge was articulated by Eduard Bernstein, a leading SPD intellectual who had spent years in exile in Britain and been influenced by Fabianism. In a series of articles published from 1896 and culminating in his 1899 book The Preconditions of Socialism (Die Voraussetzungen des Sozialismus), Bernstein argued that many of Marx's core predictions were proving incorrect. Capitalism was not on the verge of collapse; the middle class was not disappearing; and the working class was not sinking into ever-increasing misery. He concluded that the socialist movement should abandon its revolutionary goal and openly embrace a path of gradual, evolutionary reform. In a much-criticised phrase, he declared, "What is generally referred to as the ultimate aim of Socialism means nothing to me; it is the movement itself which means everything."

Bernstein's ideas were fiercely attacked by the orthodox Marxists, led by Karl Kautsky, the party's chief theorist, who argued that revisionism abandoned the essential elements of Marx's teaching—the class struggle and the inevitability of revolution. Bebel and other party leaders, anxious to preserve the revolutionary orthodoxy on which the party's identity was based, supported Kautsky. Luxemburg also made her reputation as a theorist with her polemic Social Reform or Revolution?. The SPD formally condemned revisionism at its Hanover congress in 1899 and again more forcefully at its Dresden congress in 1903.

=== The Millerand affair ===
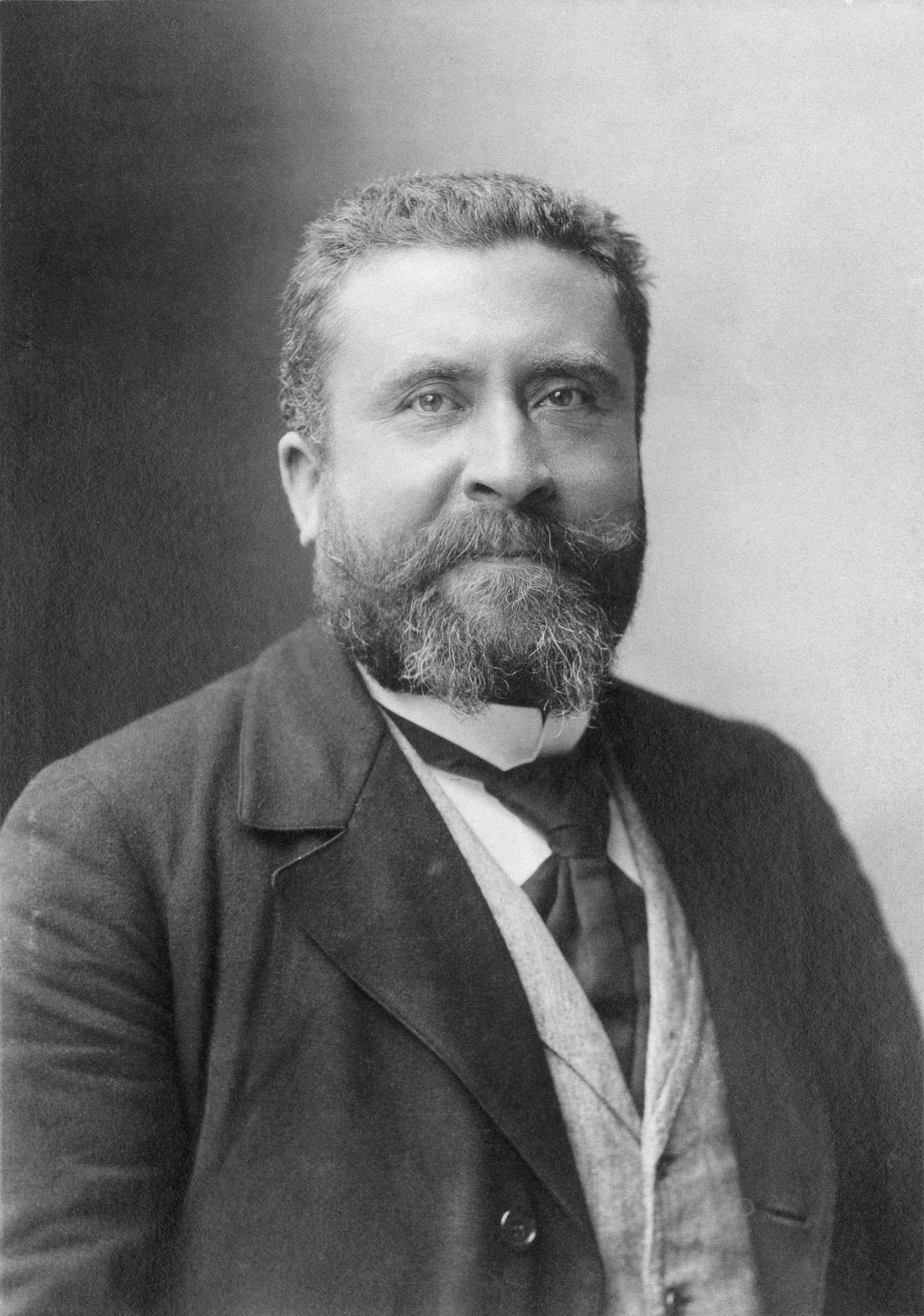
Jean Jaurès

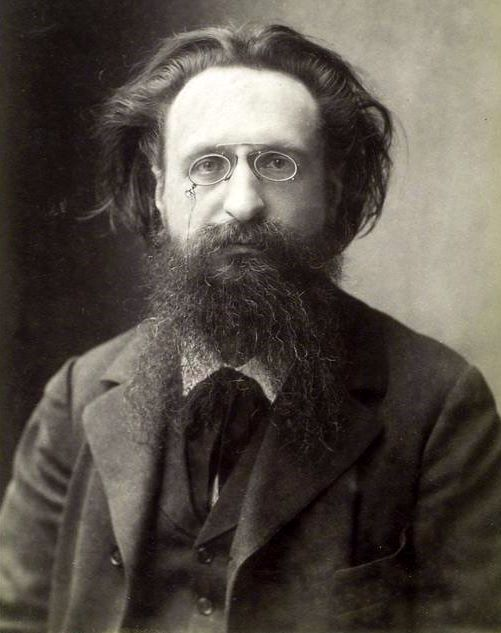
Jules Guesde

While the Germans debated in theory, the French faced the problem in practice. The Dreyfus affair deeply divided French society and created a political crisis that realigned French politics. Jean Jaurès, leader of the independent socialists, threw himself into the campaign to defend Dreyfus and the Republic against nationalists, militarists, and monarchists. This led him into an alliance with "bourgeois" republicans. The crisis culminated in June 1899 when the new Prime Minister, Pierre Waldeck-Rousseau, invited the independent socialist Alexandre Millerand to join his "Government of Republican Defence" as Minister of Commerce. Millerand's decision to accept a post alongside General Gaston Alexandre Auguste, Marquis de Galliffet, the suppressor of the 1871 Commune, caused a massive controversy within both French and international socialism.

The "Millerand case" split the French socialists. The revolutionary wing, led by Jules Guesde, condemned Millerand's participation as a betrayal of the class struggle. The reformist wing, led by Jaurès, cautiously defended it as a necessary emergency measure to save the Republic. The International addressed the issue at its Paris Congress of 1900. After a heated debate, it passed a compromise resolution, drafted by Kautsky, which condemned socialist participation in bourgeois governments in principle but allowed for it as a temporary and exceptional emergency measure, provided it was approved by the socialist party. The issue led to a formal split in France in 1902 with the creation of two rival parties: Guesde's revolutionary Socialist Party of France (PSdF) and Jaurès's reformist French Socialist Party (PSF).

At the Paris Congress, the International also decided to establish a permanent secretariat and headquarters in Brussels, creating the International Socialist Bureau (ISB) to coordinate its activities. The same congress saw a fateful twist, as the Russian Social Democratic Labour Party splintered into numerous factions, one of which became the Bolsheviks in 1903.

=== The Amsterdam Congress ===
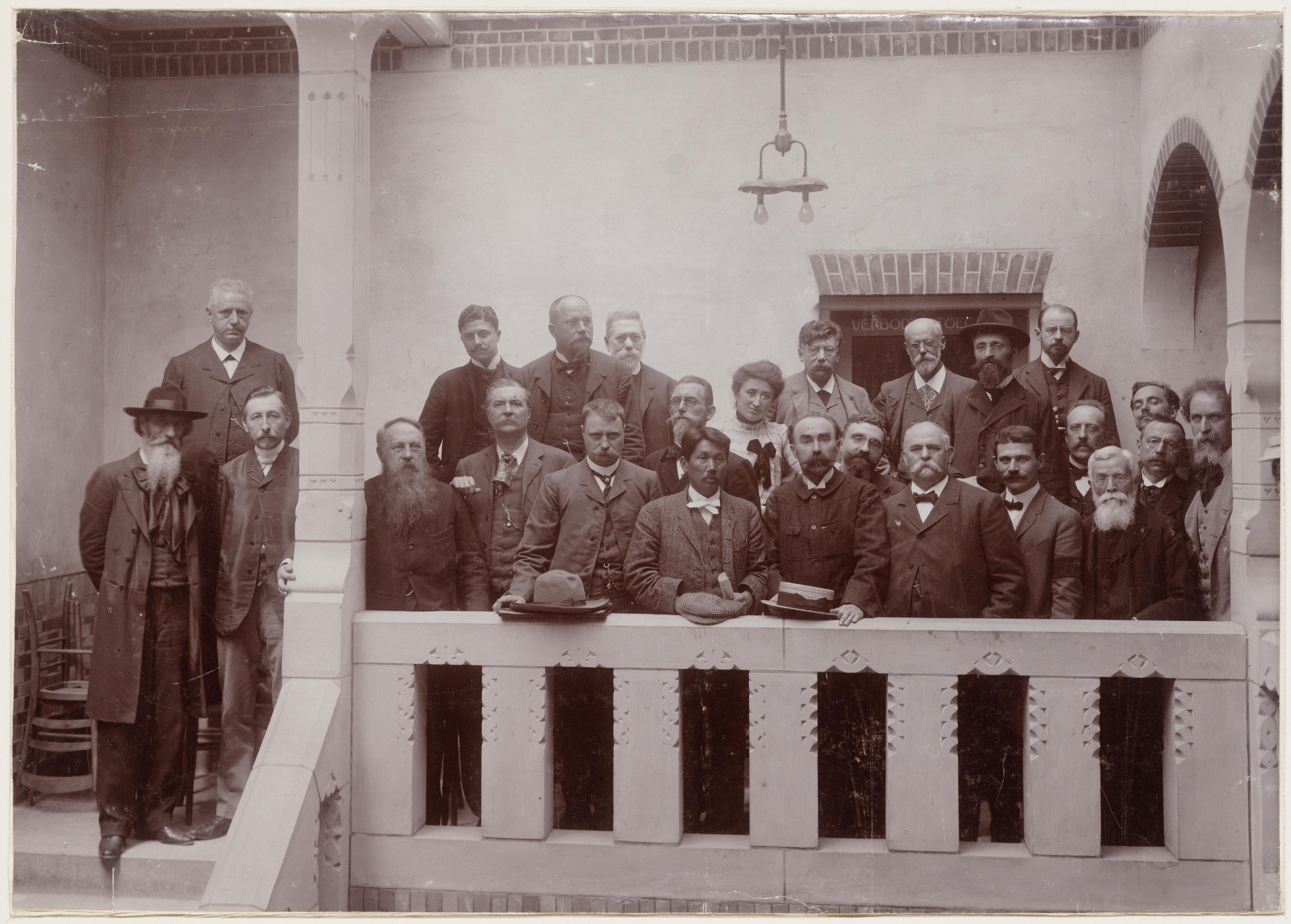
Delegates at the Amsterdam Congress of 1904

The debate reached its climax at the Amsterdam Congress of 1904. The central issue was a resolution, based on the SPD's 1903 Dresden resolution, which condemned revisionism and "all attempts to disguise existing class conflicts in order to facilitate support of bourgeois parties." The debate pitted the two greatest figures of the International against each other: Jaurès and Bebel.

Jaurès delivered a powerful speech defending his reformist strategy and attacking the political impotence of the German SPD. He argued that while the SPD had millions of voters, its rigid doctrine prevented it from exercising real political power in Germany's autocratic system. In France, by contrast, socialists could and must ally with democrats to defend liberty and advance social progress. "What at present most weighs on Europe and the world," he declared, "is not the alleged compromises... of the French Socialists... but... the political powerlessness of German Social Democracy."

Bebel, in response, reiterated the orthodox Marxist position that there could be no collaboration with the class enemy. Republics were just as much "class states" as monarchies, and the only task of socialists was to prepare for the inevitable seizure of power. Ultimately, the prestige and disciplined voting of the German delegation ensured victory. The Dresden resolution was adopted by 25 votes to 5, with 12 abstentions. The congress also passed a resolution calling for the French socialists to unite. Pressured by the International, Jaurès accepted the verdict. In April 1905, the two French parties merged to form the French Section of the Workers' International (SFIO), based on the orthodox principles dictated by the Germans.

== Nationalism and colonialism ==
The International's principle of proletarian solidarity was continually challenged by the growing force of nationalism. Its official doctrine was that class, not nationality, was the primary division in human society. At its 1891 Brussels Congress, it condemned "anti-semitic and philosemitic agitation as one of the manoeuvres by which the capitalist class and reactionary governments try to... divide the workers". However, in an age of rising national consciousness, this position became increasingly difficult to maintain.

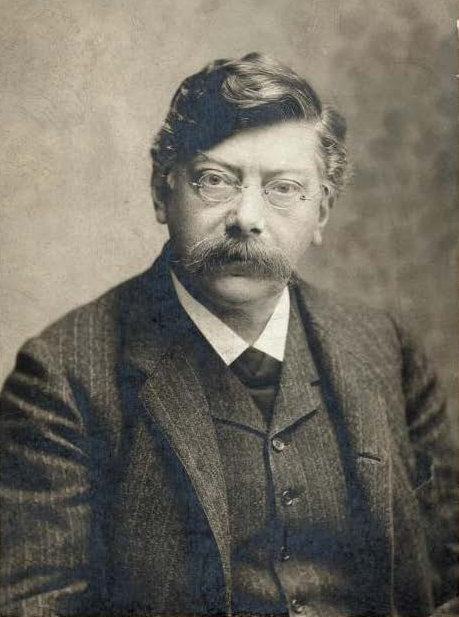
Victor Adler

The most acute test of socialist internationalism occurred within the Austrian Social Democratic Party. The party, operating in the multinational Austro-Hungarian Empire, was a "little International" in itself, priding itself on uniting German, Czech, Polish, and other workers within a single federal framework. While German-speaking leaders like Victor Adler dominated, the party had a large and growing Czech membership, as well as Polish, Slovene, and Italian sections. At its 1899 Brünn Congress, the party proposed a programme for reorganising the empire into a federal state of autonomous nationalities. However, conflicts grew, particularly within the trade unions, where Czech workers demanded separate unions from their German counterparts. In 1910, the matter was brought before the Copenhagen Congress of the International, which upheld the principle of single, unified trade unions, siding with the German-Austrian leadership. In response, a majority of the Czech socialists split from the party in 1911, and the "little International" of Austria effectively broke down.

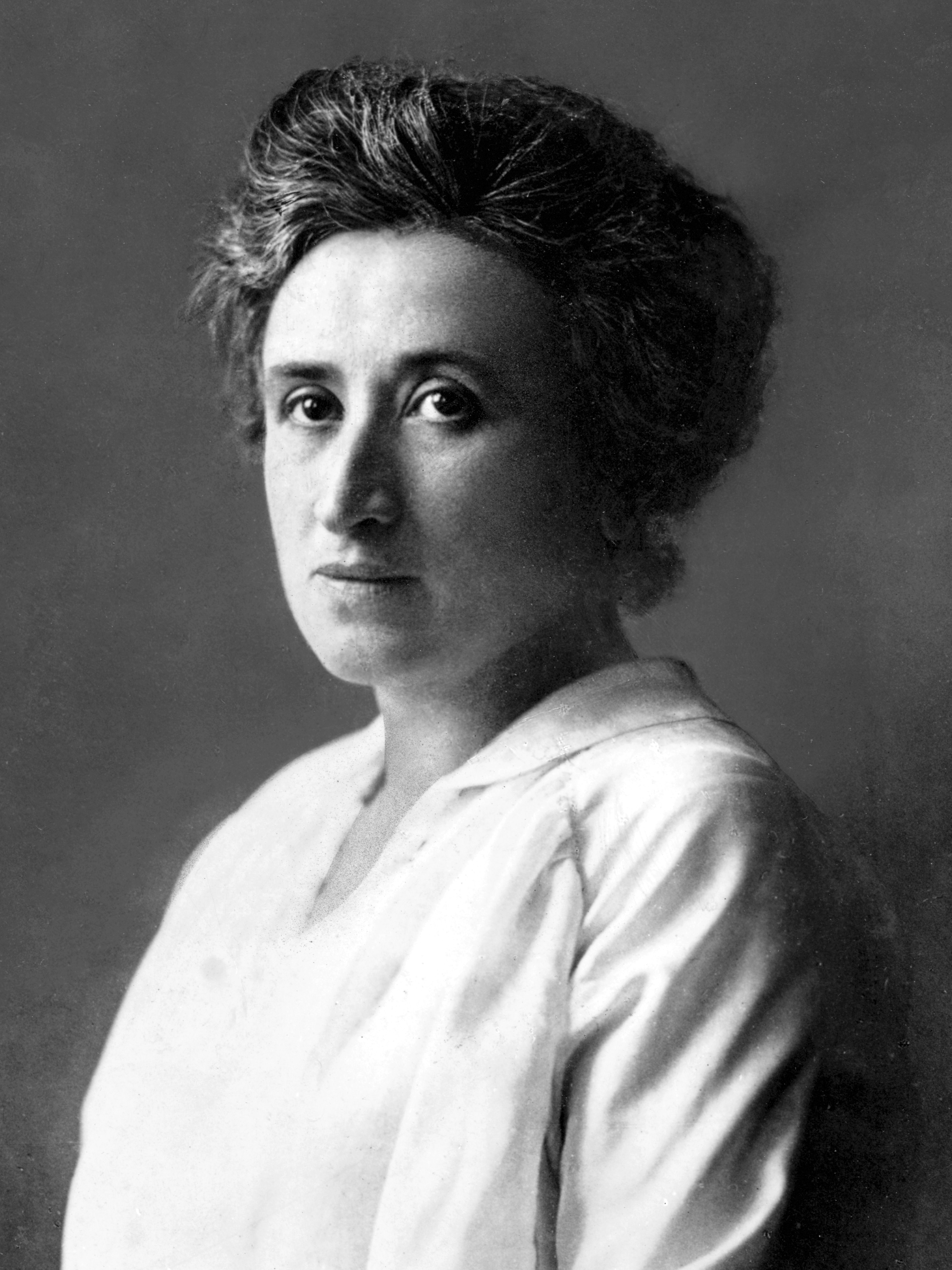
Rosa Luxemburg

A similar problem existed within the German SPD over its Polish-speaking members in Posen and Silesia. Leaders like Rosa Luxemburg, herself Polish, insisted that Polish workers should belong to the unified German party. Others argued that the party was insensitive to Polish national feeling. The SPD's official stance remained one of uncompromising centralism.

In the Balkans, Western European socialist parties generally viewed the preservation of the status quo as essential to peace, fearing that any conflict could ignite a wider war. Balkan socialist parties, however, argued that the status quo itself was the source of conflict. They called for the overthrow of the Ottoman and Austro-Hungarian empires and the formation of a democratic Balkan federation that would be free from the intrigues of the great powers. This conflict of views later came to a head during the Balkan Wars, but the major parties' desire to contain the conflict prevented the International from adopting the Balkan socialists' anti-imperialist, non-interventionist stance.

The International also debated colonial policy at its Stuttgart Congress of 1907. A vocal minority, including delegates from Britain and the Netherlands and German revisionists like Eduard David, argued that colonies were a fact of life and that socialists should work for a "socialist colonial policy" to promote reforms and the welfare of native populations, rather than simply demanding an end to all colonialism. The orthodox Marxist majority, including Kautsky, however, passed a resolution condemning colonialism in principle as an inherent part of the capitalist system of exploitation. The vote was close, 127 to 108, revealing a deep division on the issue.

== Struggle against war (1905–1914) ==
The Russo-Japanese War of 1904–1905 and the subsequent 1905 Russian Revolution refocused the International on the growing threat of war. The opening of the Amsterdam Congress had featured a symbolic handshake between Plekhanov and the Japanese socialist Sen Katayama. The revolution revived the idea of the mass strike as a political weapon, not just for domestic reforms but as a means to prevent war. From 1905, the International's congresses were dominated by debates over how to implement its anti-war principles.

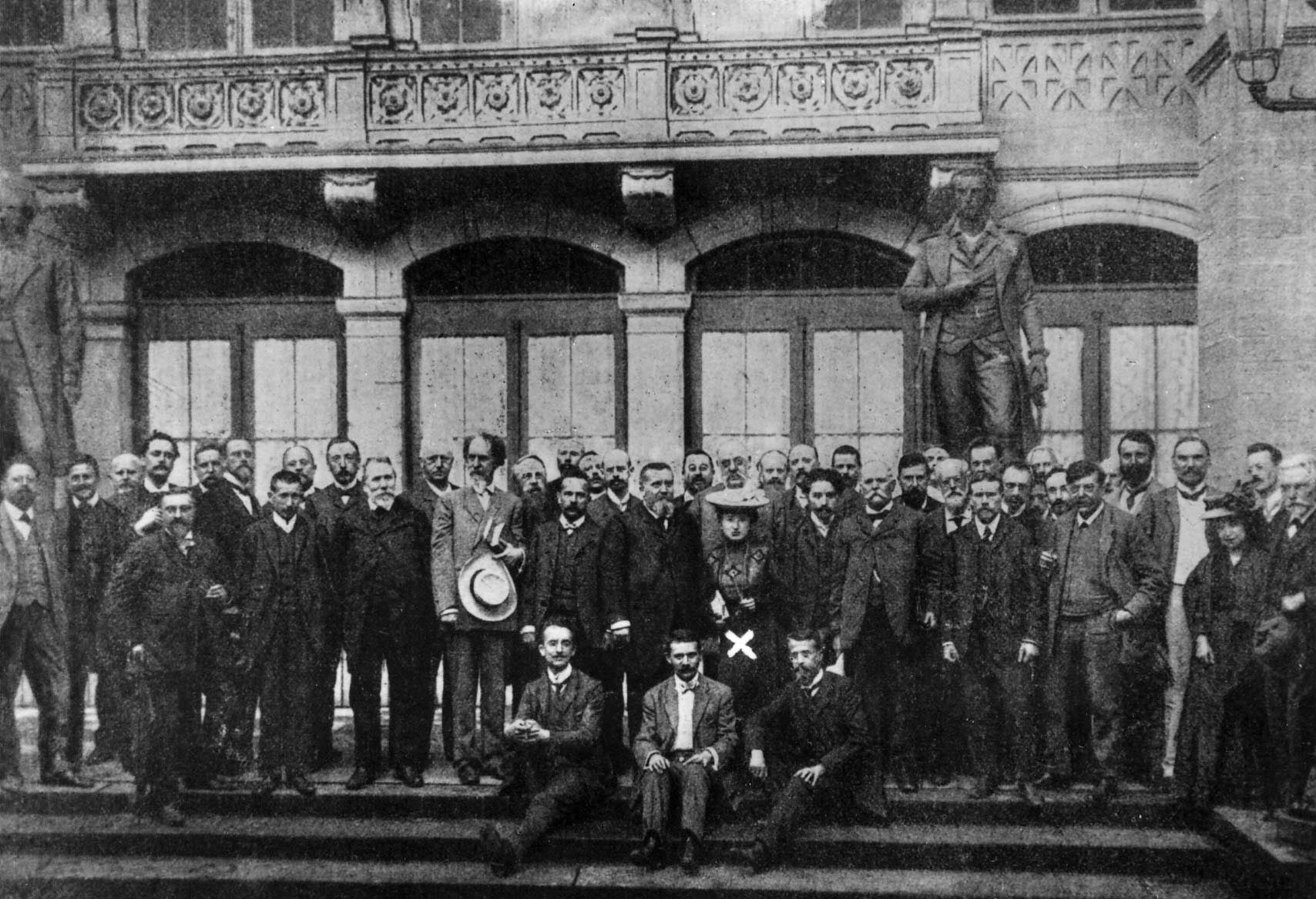
Delegates at the 1907 Stuttgart Congress

The debate at the Stuttgart Congress of 1907 was particularly significant. Four different positions emerged. The French radical Gustave Hervé argued for strikes within the military and insurrection in response to any war. Guesde and the French Marxists argued that no special action was needed, as the normal course of the class struggle would eventually abolish war. Bebel and the German leadership advocated for parliamentary pressure and reiterated the call for national militias to replace standing armies. Jaurès and Vaillant proposed a more active policy, including the use of mass strikes. The final resolution was a compromise, but it included a crucial last-minute amendment drafted by Luxemburg and Vladimir Lenin. It declared that if war should break out, it was the duty of socialists "to intercede for its speedy end, and to strive with all their power to make use of the violent economic and political crisis brought about by the war to rouse the people, and thereby to hasten the abolition of capitalist class rule." This text became the foundational statement of the revolutionary left's position on war. The Stuttgart resolution allowed different factions to leave the congress satisfied but without a clear guide to action. As historian Georges Haupt later noted, "each protagonist could regard the Stuttgart resolution as his victory."

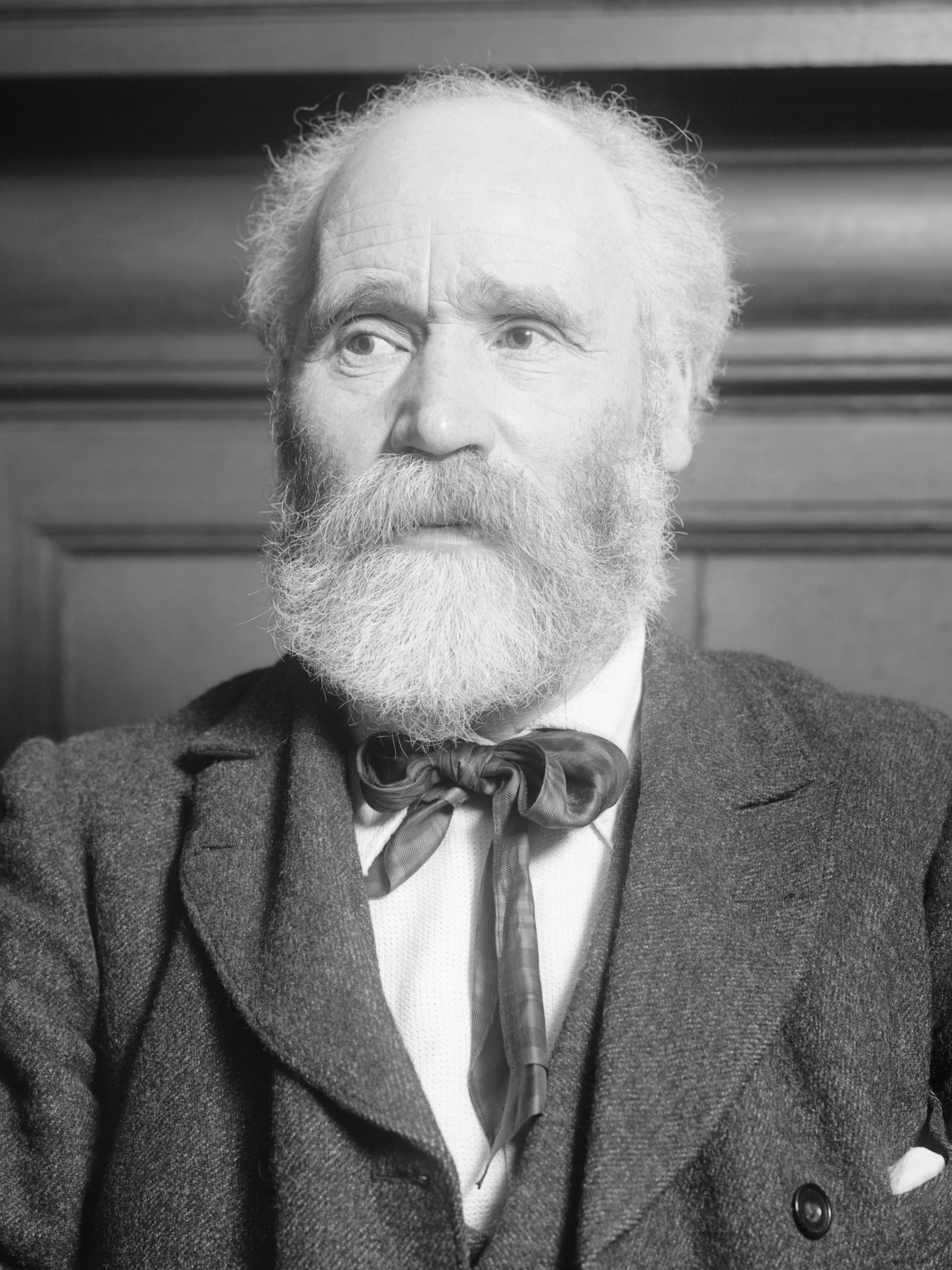
Keir Hardie

The Copenhagen Congress of 1910 revisited the issue amidst the growing Anglo-German naval arms race. Keir Hardie and Vaillant put forward an amendment explicitly calling for a general strike, particularly in industries supplying armaments, as the most effective means of preventing war. After a tired and inconclusive debate, the matter was referred to the International Socialist Bureau (ISB) for further study, with the issue to be definitively settled at the next international congress scheduled for Vienna in 1914.

In November 1912, as the Balkan Wars threatened to escalate into a general European conflict, the International held an extraordinary emergency congress in Basel, Switzerland. The event was a massive and emotional demonstration for peace. Delegates marched to the Basel cathedral, led by children singing socialist songs, where the bells were rung in a gesture of welcome. The congress unanimously adopted a manifesto that reiterated the Stuttgart resolution and called on the workers of all countries to oppose war. The congress itself was preceded by massive anti-war demonstrations in the major European capitals, and the atmosphere of unity and enthusiasm gave the International an "illusory power" in the eyes of its leaders. The congress marked, in historian James Joll's words, "the high point of the International's optimistic self-confidence". Many leaders left Basel convinced that the strength of the international socialist movement was a genuine guarantee of peace. Jaurès expressed this hope, declaring that the International was "strong enough to speak in this tone of command to those in power and if necessary to follow up their words with deeds."

=== "Détente" of 1913–1914 ===
The successful containment of the Balkan Wars without a general European conflict created a wave of optimism within the International. By 1913, many leaders came to believe that the immediate threat of war had receded. This mood was reinforced by a new interpretation of imperialism, advanced by Karl Kautsky and others, which suggested that the growing economic interdependence of the great powers would make war between them irrational and counter-productive. This theory of "ultra-imperialism" argued that capitalist interests were becoming aligned with the preservation of peace. This feeling of détente was reflected in practical initiatives, such as the Franco-German parliamentary conference held in Bern in May 1913, and a new emphasis on international arbitration and a "triple alliance" between Britain, France and Germany as the guarantors of European peace. The optimism was not universal, with Jaurès and the revolutionary left remaining more cautious, but the prevailing mood in 1913 and early 1914 was one of confidence that the International's strategy of prevention was working and that a lasting peace was attainable.

== World War I and collapse ==
=== Outbreak of war ===
Map of European alliances on the eve of World War I, 1914

The optimistic spirit of Basel proved illusory. On 28 June 1914, Archduke Franz Ferdinand of Austria was assassinated in Sarajevo, but the seriousness of the crisis was not immediately apparent to socialist leaders, many of whom left for their summer holidays. When Austria-Hungary presented its July Ultimatum to Serbia on 23 July, the International was caught off guard. The socialist press across Europe condemned the ultimatum, and on 25 July, the SPD leadership issued a strong appeal for peace, declaring that "No drop of a German soldier's blood must be sacrificed to the Austrian despots' lust for power", though it stopped short of outlining a concrete plan of action. Austria-Hungary declared war on Serbia on 28 July, starting World War I.

On 29 July, the ISB held an emergency meeting in Brussels. The mood was one of anxiety, but not yet of despair. The leaders present—including Jaurès from France, Adler from Austria, Hugo Haase from Germany, and Hardie from Britain—reaffirmed their commitment to the Stuttgart and Basel resolutions. Adler delivered a deeply pessimistic report on the mood in Vienna, confessing the powerlessness of the Austrian party to resist the tide of war fever and warning that the International should not count on its resistance: "The war is already with us... We are at war, our newspapers are suppressed. We are living in a state of emergency... any action on our part... is completely impossible". In contrast, Haase expressed confidence that the German working class, which had just participated in huge anti-war demonstrations, could be mobilised against war. The Bureau's only concrete decision was to move the upcoming international congress from Vienna to Paris, rescheduling it for 9 August to act as a massive protest. The meeting concluded with a mass rally at the Cirque Royal, where Jaurès made his final, powerful speech for peace and international arbitration.

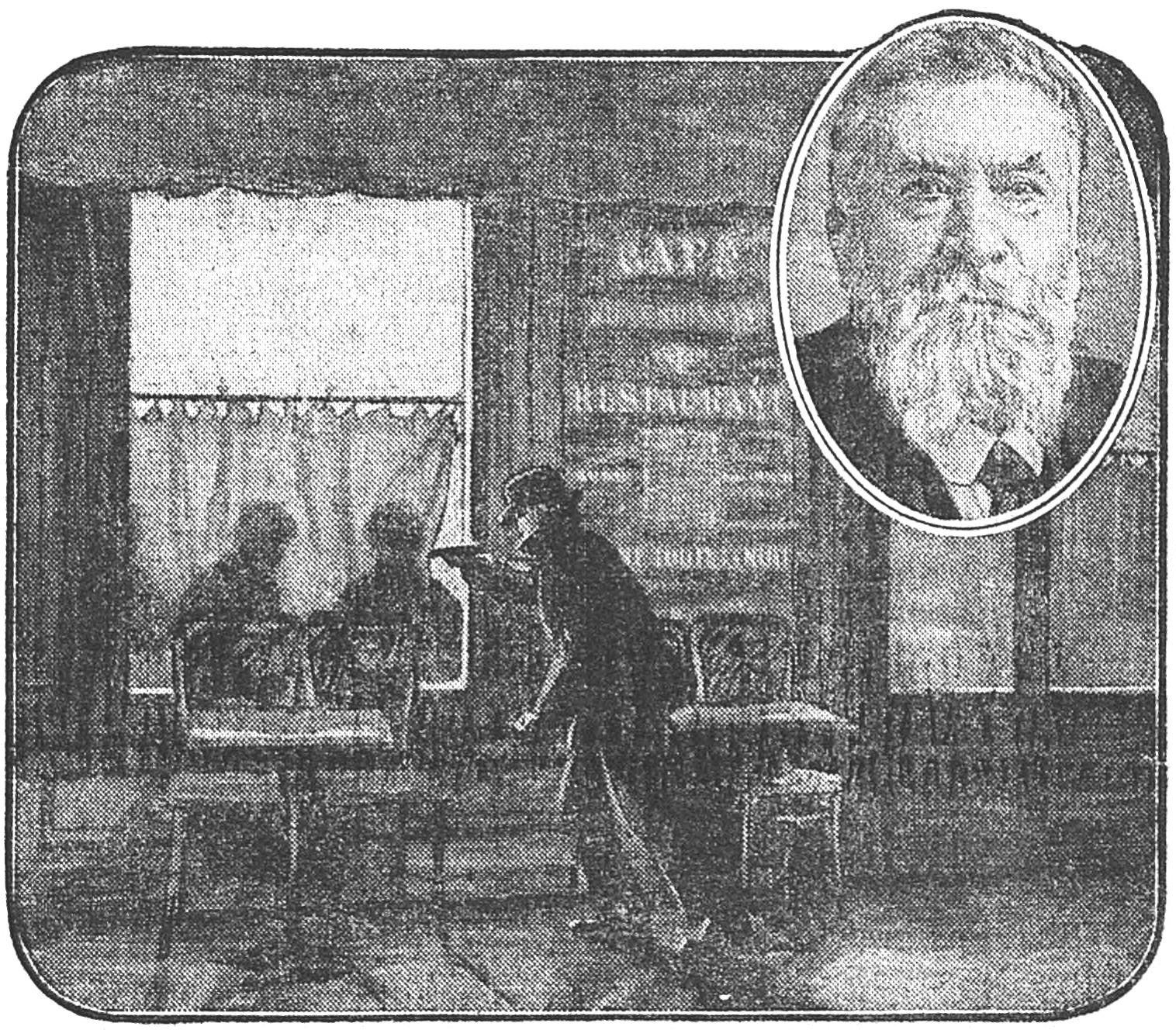
Depiction of Jaurès's assassination

Two days later, on 31 July, Jaurès was assassinated in a Parisian café by a young nationalist fanatic. His death was a devastating blow, depriving both French socialism and the International of its most charismatic and dedicated anti-war leader. On the same day, Germany issued its declaration of a "state of imminent danger of war," and on 1 August, Germany declared war on Russia and general mobilisation began in France and Germany. A last-minute attempt at coordination failed when Hermann Müller, sent by the SPD to Paris, found the French socialists, reeling from Jaurès's murder and facing a German invasion, unwilling to consider voting against war credits.

On 4 August 1914, the final collapse occurred. In Berlin, the SPD parliamentary group, swayed by a combination of fear of government repression, loyalty to the state in the face of the "Russian menace", and the patriotic fervour of its own base, voted unanimously for war credits. Haase, who had opposed the war in internal party meetings (where the vote was 78 to 14 in favour of the credits), read the party's declaration in the Reichstag, announcing the policy of Burgfrieden (civil truce). In Paris, on the same day, the socialists also voted for war credits, joining the Union sacrée (sacred union) of national defence. Soon, the socialists in Austria, Belgium, and Great Britain had also rallied to their respective governments. Socialists entered the wartime governments in France (Jules Guesde, Marcel Sembat) and Belgium (Émile Vandervelde). The Second International was dead. Only in Serbia and Russia did socialist deputies vote against the war.

=== Wartime split (1914–1917) ===
The war irrevocably split the international socialist movement. The majority factions in the belligerent countries, known as "social patriots", sided with their governments. A minority opposed the war from a pacifist or revolutionary standpoint. In December 1914, the ISB, now based in The Hague in the neutral Netherlands, made a futile attempt to unite the parties of neutral countries at a conference in Copenhagen in January 1915. In response, the social-patriotic parties of the Allied countries held their own conference in London in February 1915, followed by the parties of the Central Powers in Vienna in April 1915.

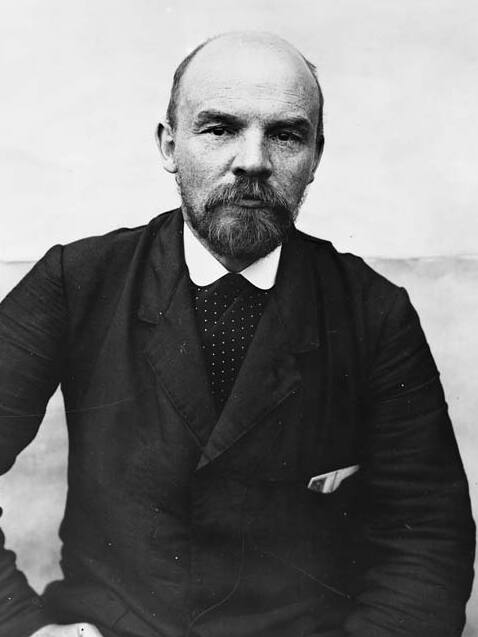
Vladimir Lenin

The anti-war minority organised itself as the Zimmerwald movement. In September 1915, a small group of anti-war socialists from Germany, France, Russia, and other countries met at the Zimmerwald Conference in Switzerland. The conference exposed a growing rift between a pacifist majority, who sought an immediate peace without annexations or indemnities, and a revolutionary left, led by Vladimir Lenin. Lenin called for turning the imperialist war into a civil war and for the creation of a new, Third International. The division deepened at the Kienthal Conference in April 1916. The final major attempt to reunite the movement during the war was the abortive Stockholm Conference of 1917. Initiated by neutral socialists and the Petrograd Soviet after the February Revolution in Russia, the conference aimed to bring all socialist parties together to broker a peace settlement. However, the Allied governments refused to issue passports to their delegates, causing the conference to collapse before it could convene.

== Disintegration and successors (1919–1923) ==
After the war, attempts to revive the International failed amidst the split between the social democratic and communist wings of the labour movement. In February 1919, the first postwar conference was held in Bern. Delegates were present from most of the former neutral and Allied parties, as well as the German Majority Socialists and Independents (USPD), but the Belgians refused to sit with the Germans, and the parties that had supported the Zimmerwald Left, including the French, Italian, and Swiss parties, were absent. The conference was dominated by two issues: a debate over "war responsibility", which resulted in a compromise resolution that left the French delegates unsatisfied, and a resolution that condemned the Bolshevik dictatorship in Russia and endorsed parliamentary democracy. A commission was appointed to reconstruct the International.

A month later, in March 1919, the Communist International (Comintern or Third International) was founded in Moscow, based on a total rejection of the "social patriotism" and failed legacy of the Second International. The conferences of the reconstituted Second International at Lucerne in August 1919 and Geneva in July 1920 represented an ever-shrinking "rump" of the old organisation, as many of its former member parties either left to join the Comintern or disaffiliated to seek a third way. In February 1921, this latter group, which included the German Independents, the French SFIO, the British ILP, and the Austrian Social Democrats, founded the International Working Union of Socialist Parties (IWUSP), known as the "Vienna Union" or the "Two-and-a-half International". The Vienna Union criticised both the Second and Third Internationals and sought to unite the divided socialist movement. The formal end of the Second International came in May 1923, when the Berne International and the Vienna Union merged at a congress in Hamburg to form the Labour and Socialist International.

== Congresses and conferences ==
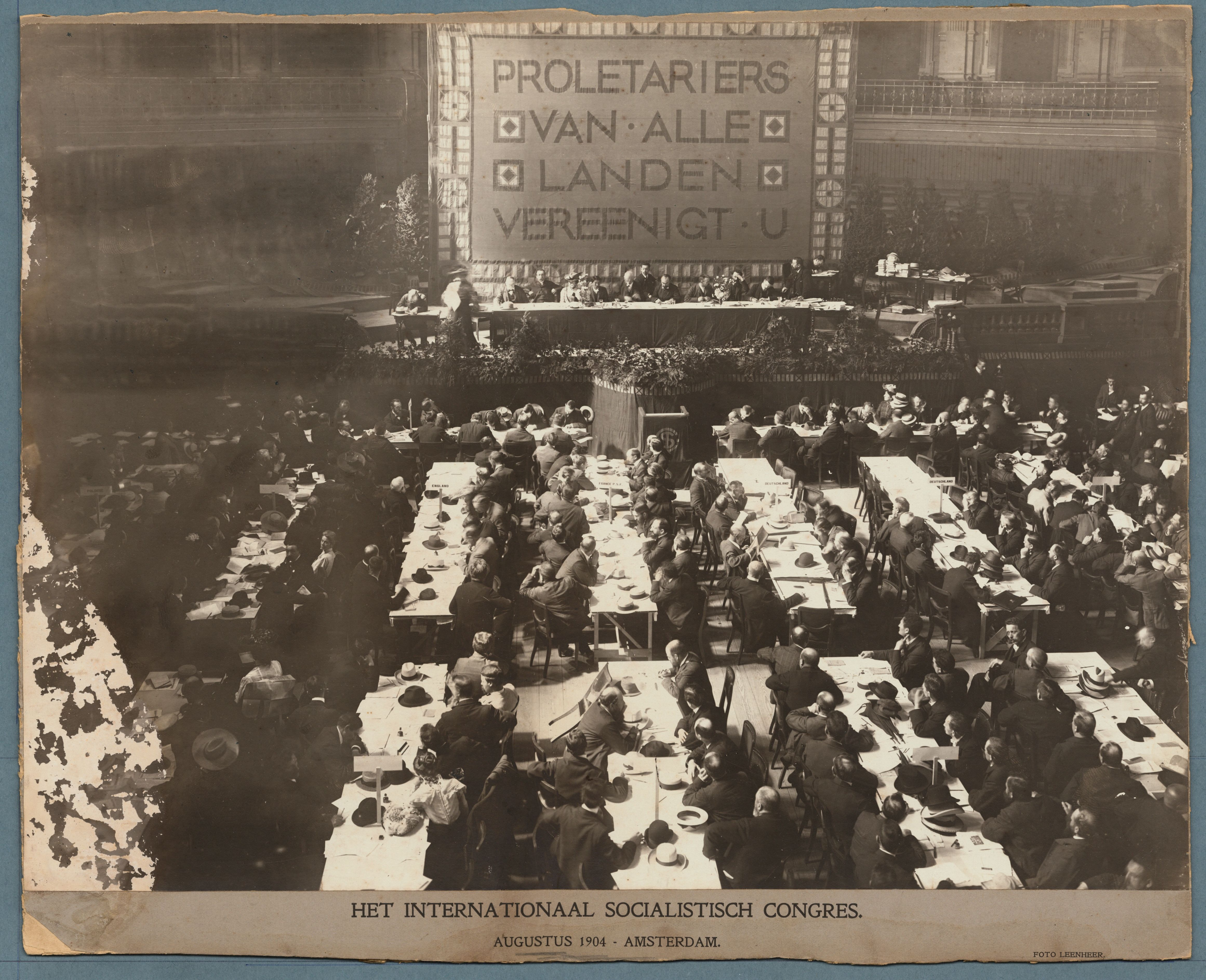
Session of the Amsterdam Congress of 1904, with a banner reading "Proletarians of all countries, unite!"

- First Congress: Paris, 14–19 July 1889
- Second Congress: Brussels, 3–7 August 1891
- Third Congress: Zurich, 9–13 August 1893
- Fourth Congress: London, 26–31 July 1896
- Fifth Congress: Paris, 23–27 September 1900
- Sixth Congress: Amsterdam, 14–20 August 1904
- Seventh Congress: Stuttgart, 18–24 August 1907
- Eighth Congress: Copenhagen, 28 August – 3 September 1910
- Ninth Congress: Basel, 24–25 November 1912
- Extraordinary session of the Bureau: Brussels, 29–30 July 1914
- Tenth Congress: Bern, 3–8 February 1919
- Conference: Lucerne, 1–9 August 1919
- Eleventh Congress: Geneva, 31 July – 4 August 1920

Socialist Parties of Neutral Countries:

- Conference: Copenhagen, 17–18 January 1915

Inter-Allied Socialist Parties:

- First Conference: London, 14 February 1915
- Second Conference: London, 28–29 August 1917
- Third Conference: London, 20–24 February 1918
- Fourth Conference: London, 15 September 1918

Central European Socialist Parties:

- Conference: Vienna, 12–13 April 1915

Zimmerwald Movement:

- First Conference: Zimmerwald, 5–8 September 1915
- Second Conference: Kienthal, 24–30 April 1916
- Third Conference: Stockholm, 5–12 September 1917

Vienna International:

- Conference: Vienna, 22–27 February 1921

== Organization ==
Unlike the centrally directed First International, the Second International was established as a loose federation of autonomous national parties and trade unions, each working independently although sharing a common socialist vision. For its first decade, the organization possessed no permanent structure or executive machinery; it existed solely in the form of periodic congresses organized by local parties. This decentralized structure was codified at the 1896 London Congress, which affirmed the autonomy of national groups as a fundamental principle.

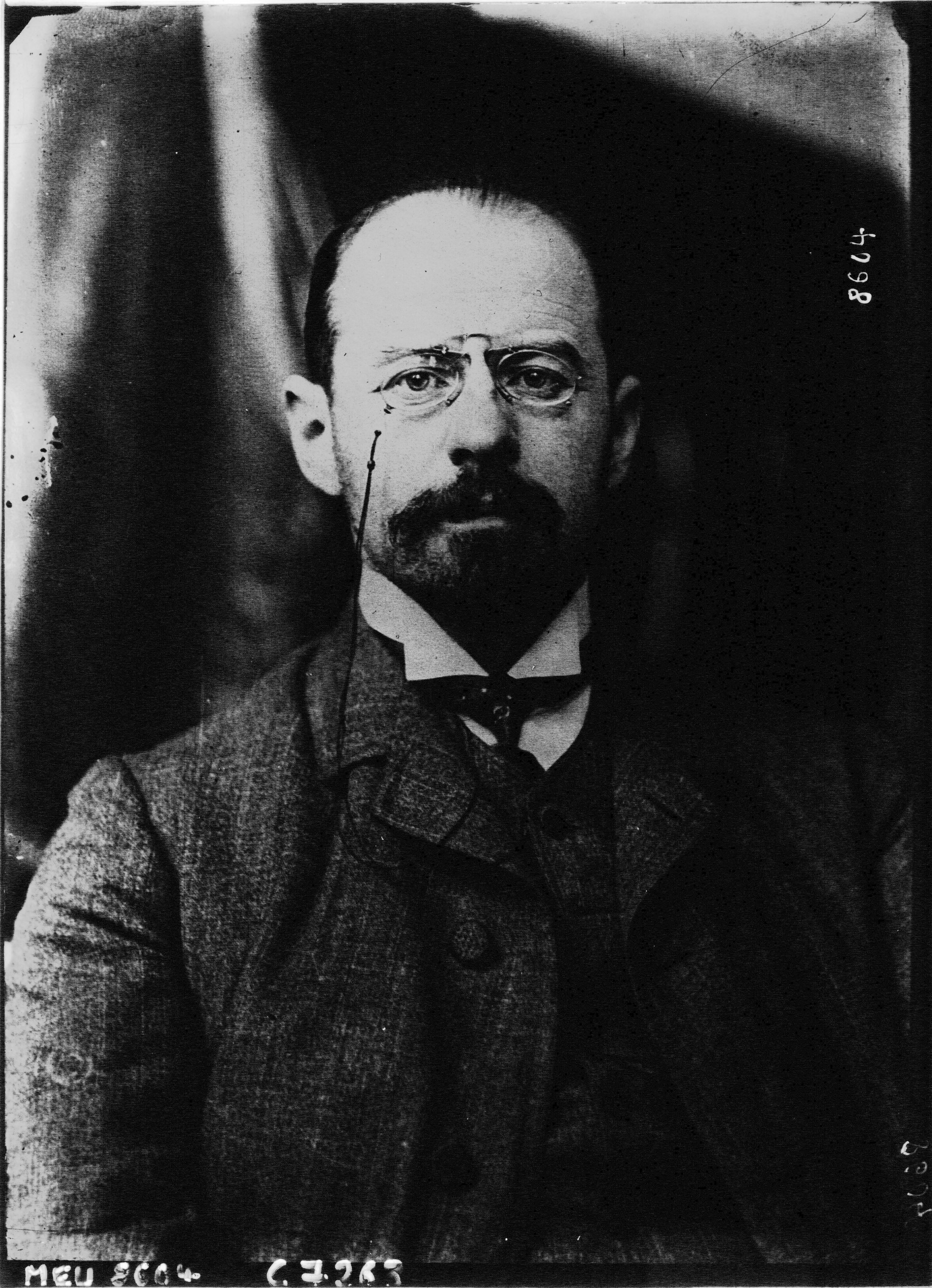
Emile Vandervelde

To provide continuity and coordination between congresses, the 1900 Paris Congress established the International Socialist Bureau (ISB). Headquartered in Brussels, the ISB was composed of two delegates from each national section and was managed by an Executive Committee appointed by the Belgian Labour Party, including Emile Vandervelde and Edward Anseele. The Bureau's efficacy increased significantly after 1905 under the leadership of its permanent secretary, Camille Huysmans. While the ISB grew in moral authority, serving as a center for information exchange and the coordination of international solidarity campaigns, it remained an "organ of correlation, not direction," lacking the power to impose binding decisions on member parties.

=== Affiliated parties and organizations ===
Affiliated parties and organizations of the Second International
Country/Region	Organization name	Years of affiliation	Notes
Argentina	Socialist Party of Argentina (PSA)	1896–1914	Founded in 1896; represented the only existing socialist group in Argentina at the time. First report submitted to the 1896 London Congress.
Armenia (Ottoman/Russian)	Armenian Revolutionary Federation (Dashnaktsutyun)	1907–1914	Admitted at the 1907 Stuttgart Congress.
Armenia (Ottoman/Russian)	Social Democrat Hunchakian Party	1904–1914	Submitted a report to the 1904 Amsterdam Congress.
Australia	Socialist Labor Party	1904–1914	Submitted a report to the 1904 Amsterdam Congress.
Australia	Victorian Socialist Party	1907–1914	Affiliated as part of the Socialist Federation of Australia.
Austria-Hungary (Cisleithania)	Social Democratic Party of Austria (SDAPÖ)	1889–1914	Founded at the Hainfeld Congress (1888–1889), uniting moderate and radical factions under Victor Adler. Served as a "Little International" within the Empire.
Austria-Hungary (Cisleithania)	Czech Social Democratic Party	1893–1914	Represented separately from the Austrian party at congresses; advocated for federalism within the Empire.
Austria-Hungary (Cisleithania)	Polish Social Democratic Party of Galicia (PPSD)	1907–1914	Represented the Polish minority in Galicia; distinct from the PPS in the Russian partition.
Austria-Hungary (Cisleithania)	Ukrainian Social Democratic Party (USDP)	1907–1914	Represented Ukrainian workers in Galicia and Bukovina.
Austria-Hungary (Cisleithania)	Yugoslav Social Democratic Party	1907–1914	Represented within the Austrian delegation context.
Austria-Hungary (Cisleithania)	Trade Union Commission of Austria	1896–1914	Submitted reports to congresses (e.g. 1896, 1910).
Austria-Hungary (Transleithania)	Hungarian Social Democratic Party (MSZDP)	1890–1914	Founded in 1890; adopted the Austrian Hainfeld program.
Austria-Hungary (Transleithania)	Social Democratic Party of Croatia and Slavonia	1893–1914	Represented at congresses (e.g., Basel 1912).
Austria-Hungary (Bosnia and Herzegovina)	Social Democratic Party of Bosnia and Herzegovina	1909–1914	Submitted a memorandum on the labor movement in 1909.
Belgium	Belgian Labour Party (POB)	1889–1914	Founded in 1885. A federation of political, trade union, and co-operative organizations (including Vooruit). Provided the leadership for the ISB.
Bolivia	Workers' Union of the First of May	1907–1914	Submitted a report to the 1907 Stuttgart Congress.
Brazil	Workers' Party	1893	Submitted a report to the 1893 Zurich Congress.
Bulgaria	Bulgarian Social Democratic Workers' Party (Broads)	1893–1914	Reformist faction led by Yanko Sakazov; remained affiliated after the 1903 split.
Bulgaria	Bulgarian Social Democratic Workers' Party (Narrows)	1904–1914	Revolutionary faction led by Dimitar Blagoev; admitted separately in 1904.
Canada	Socialist Party of Canada	1904–1914	Submitted a report to the 1904 Amsterdam Congress.
Chile	Democratic Party	1907–1914	Founded by Luis Emilio Recabarren; submitted a report in 1907.
Republic of China	Socialist Party of China	1912–1914	Maintained correspondence with the ISB; led by Jiang Kanghu.
Cuba	Socialist Party of Cuba	1904–1914	Request for affiliation submitted in 1904.
Denmark	Social Democratic Party	1889–1914	Founded in 1871; reorganized in 1880.
Denmark	Danish Confederation of Trade Unions	1896–1914	Submitted reports on the trade union movement (e.g., 1910).
France	Federation of the Socialist Workers of France (FTSF)	1889–1902	"Possibilists" led by Paul Brousse. Reformist orientation; merged into the PSF in 1902.
France	French Workers' Party (POF)	1889–1902	Marxist party led by Jules Guesde and Paul Lafargue. Opposed "ministerialism"; merged into the PSdF in 1902.
France	Central Revolutionary Committee (CRC) / Socialist Revolutionary Party (PSR)	1889–1902	Blanquists led by Édouard Vaillant. Merged into the PSdF in 1902.
France	Revolutionary Socialist Workers' Party (POSR)	1890–1902	"Allemanists" led by Jean Allemane. Split from the FTSF; emphasized trade union action and the general strike.
France	Independent Socialists	1893–1902	Parliamentary group including Jean Jaurès and Alexandre Millerand. Favored republican defense and reform; merged into the PSF in 1902.
France	French Socialist Party (PSF)	1902–1905	Union of the Possibilist FTSF, Jaurès's Independents, and the right wing of the Allemanists. Reformist orientation. Merged into the SFIO.
France	Socialist Party of France (PSdF)	1902–1905	Union of the Guesdist POF, Blanquist PSR, and the left wing of the Allemanists. Revolutionary orientation. Merged into the SFIO.
France	French Section of the Workers' International (SFIO)	1905–1914	Unified party formed in 1905 at the Globe Congress, merging the PSdF and PSF.
France	General Confederation of Labour (CGT)	1889–1896	Includes predecessor National Federation of Trade Unions. Participated in the 1896 London Congress where syndicalist delegates opposed the political action resolution; subsequently separated from the International.
German Empire	Social Democratic Party of Germany (SPD)	1889–1914	The largest and most influential party in the International. Operated under the Marxist Erfurt Program (1891).
German Empire	Association of Independent Socialists	1893	"Jungen" faction led by Gustav Landauer; expelled for anarchism after 1893.
German Empire	General Commission of German Trade Unions	1896–1914	Led by Carl Legien. Submitted reports to congresses (e.g. 1896, 1900).
Greece	Socialist League	1889–1914	Represented at the founding congress by Platon Drakoulis.
Iran	Democrat Party	1910–1914	Report submitted to the 1910 Copenhagen Congress.
Ireland	Irish Socialist Republican Party	1896–1904	In 1900 it sent delegates to the International Socialist Congress of the Second International in Paris, representing Ireland instead of Britain.
Italy	Italian Socialist Party (PSI)	1892–1914	Founded in 1892 at the Genoa Congress. Led by Filippo Turati.
Italy	Italian Reformist Socialist Party (PSRI)	1912–1914	Founded by Leonida Bissolati and Ivanoe Bonomi after being expelled from the PSI for supporting the Italo-Turkish War.
Italy	General Confederation of Labour (CGL)	1906–1914	Submitted a report to the 1907 Stuttgart Congress.
Empire of Japan	Social Democratic Party	1903–1914	The party was founded in 1901 and banned immediately; Sen Katayama represented the socialist movement (often organized as the Heimin-sha) at the International, and famously protested the Russo-Japanese War at the Amsterdam Congress.
Luxembourg	Social Democratic Party of Luxembourg	1901–1914	Submitted report to the 1904 Amsterdam Congress.
Netherlands	Social Democratic League (SDB)	1889–1896	Led by Ferdinand Domela Nieuwenhuis. Moved toward anarchism and was excluded after the 1896 London Congress.
Netherlands	Social Democratic Workers' Party (SDAP)	1894–1914	Founded by Pieter Jelles Troelstra after splitting from the SDB. Modelled on the German SPD.
Netherlands	Social Democratic Party (SDP)	1909–1914	"Tribunists" led by David Wijnkoop; split from SDAP.
New Zealand	Socialist Party	1912–1914	Affiliation reported in 1912.
New Zealand	United Labour Party	1912–1914	Affiliation reported in 1912.
Norway	Norwegian Labour Party (DNA)	1889–1914	Founded in 1887.
Poland (partitioned)	Proletariat	1889	The first Polish socialist party; its remnants participated in the founding of the International.
Poland (partitioned)	Polish Socialist Party (PPS)	1892–1914	Founded in Paris. Advocated for Polish independence; led by Józef Piłsudski.
Poland (partitioned)	Social Democracy of the Kingdom of Poland and Lithuania (SDKPiL)	1895–1914	Marxist internationalist break-away from the PPS; led by Rosa Luxemburg and Leo Jogiches. Opposed Polish independence in favor of proletarian revolution.
Poland (partitioned)	Polish Socialist Party – Left	1907–1914	Split from the PPS; submitted reports from 1907.
Portugal	Portuguese Socialist Party	1889–1914	Represented at the 1889, 1896, and 1900 congresses. Report submitted 1896.
Romania	Social Democratic Workers' Party of Romania (PSDR)	1893–1914	Founded in 1893; dissolved in 1899 and reconstituted in 1910 by Christian Rakovsky.
Russian Empire	Emancipation of Labour	1889–1898	First Russian Marxist group, founded in Geneva by Georgi Plekhanov; merged into the RSDLP.
Russian Empire	Russian Social Democratic Labour Party (RSDLP)	1898–1914	Split into Bolsheviks and Mensheviks in 1903, though both factions remained within the International.
Russian Empire	Socialist Revolutionary Party (SR)	1902–1914	Agrarian socialist party; represented the Narodnik tradition.
Russian Empire	General Jewish Labour Bund	1897–1914	Represented Jewish workers in Russia, Poland, and Lithuania.
Russian Empire	Jewish Socialist Workers Party (SERP)	1907–1914	Also known as the "Sejmists"; submitted a report to the 1907 Stuttgart Congress.
Russian Empire	Zionist Socialist Workers Party (SS)	1908–1914	Affiliation request discussed in 1908.
Russian Empire	Poale Zion	1907–1914	Represented as the "World Confederation"; affiliation discussed in 1908.
Russian Empire (Finland)	Social Democratic Party of Finland	1904–1914	Founded in 1899; led the general strike of 1905 which secured universal suffrage in Finland.
Russian Empire (Latvia)	Social Democracy of the Latvian Territory (LSDSP)	1904–1914	Submitted reports from 1904.
Russian Empire (Lithuania)	Lithuanian Social Democratic Party (LSDP)	1896–1914	Submitted reports to the 1896 London Congress.
Russian Empire (Ukraine)	Ukrainian Social Democratic Labour Party (USDRP)	1907–1914	Formed from the Revolutionary Ukrainian Party (RUP); submitted reports from 1907.
Russian Empire (Ukraine)	Ukrainian Socialist Revolutionary Party (UPSR)	1907–1914	Submitted reports to the 1907 Stuttgart Congress.
Serbia	Serbian Social Democratic Party	1903–1914	Voted against war credits in 1914.
South Africa	South African Labour Party	1904–1914	Represented from 1904.
Spain	Spanish Socialist Workers' Party (PSOE)	1889–1914	Founded in 1879 by Pablo Iglesias Posse.
Spain	Unión General de Trabajadores (UGT)	1896–1914	Submitted reports to congresses (e.g. 1896).
Sweden	Swedish Social Democratic Party (SAP)	1889–1914	Founded in 1889 by Hjalmar Branting.
Switzerland	Grütli Union	1889–1901	Founded in 1838; merged into the SP in 1901.
Switzerland	Social Democratic Party of Switzerland (SP)	1889–1914	Founded in 1888 by Albert Steck; adopted a Marxist program in 1904.
Ottoman Empire	Socialist Workers' Federation	1909–1914	Organization based in Salonica, led by Avraam Benaroya.
Ottoman Empire	Ottoman Socialist Party	1910–1914	Submitted a report on the situation in Turkey in 1910.
United Kingdom	Social Democratic Federation (SDF) / British Socialist Party (BSP)	1889–1914	Marxist organization led by Henry Hyndman; became the BSP in 1911.
United Kingdom	Socialist League	1889–1896	Led by William Morris. Split from the SDF; early participation faded as it turned toward anarchism.
United Kingdom	Fabian Society	1889–1914	Reformist intellectual group including Sidney Webb and George Bernard Shaw.
United Kingdom	Independent Labour Party (ILP)	1893–1914	Founded by Keir Hardie. Sought to establish a labour party independent of the Liberals.
United Kingdom	Labour Party	1900–1914	Founded as the Labour Representation Committee (LRC). A federation of trade unions and socialist societies.
United Kingdom	Trades Union Congress (TUC)	1889–1896	The Parliamentary Committee organized the 1889 "Possibilist" Congress in Paris and participated in the 1891 Brussels and 1896 London congresses.
United Kingdom	Gas Workers and General Labourers' Union	1891–1893	Submitted reports to the 1891 and 1893 congresses.
United States	Socialist Labor Party of America (SLP)	1889–1914	Represented at the 1889 congress. Orthodox Marxist party led by Daniel De Leon.
United States	Socialist Party of America (SPA)	1901–1914	Formed from a merger of the Social Democratic Party of America and dissidents from the SLP.
Venezuela	Socialist Group of Venezuela	1893	Submitted a report to the 1893 Zurich Congress.

=== Auxiliary organizations ===
As the International expanded, it established specialized bodies to coordinate specific sectors of the socialist movement. These organizations generally held conferences in conjunction with the main international congresses:

- Inter-Parliamentary Socialist Commission (CIS): Established provisionally in 1904 to coordinate the tactics of socialist deputies in national parliaments, it held its first plenary session in London in 1906. After 1906, it effectively functioned as an annex of the ISB, which assumed its secretarial duties to prevent institutional redundancy.
- Socialist Women's International: Formed at the First International Conference of Socialist Women in Stuttgart in 1907, this body elected Clara Zetkin as its secretary and designated her journal, Die Gleichheit, as its official organ. It focused on issues such as female suffrage and the protection of working women.
- International Federation of Socialist Young People: Created following a conference at the 1907 Stuttgart Congress to link socialist youth movements across borders. Headquartered first in Leipzig and later in Vienna under Robert Danneberg, it published a monthly bulletin and maintained a strained relationship with the ISB regarding its autonomy and anti-militarist stance.
- International Conference of Socialist Journalists: Initiated in 1907 to improve the exchange of information between the socialist press and to counter "tendentious information" from bourgeois news agencies.

== Legacy and historical assessment ==
The collapse of the Second International in 1914 has been the subject of extensive historical debate. Explanations range from the polemical—Lenin's view that it was a "betrayal" by opportunist leaders—to the structural. Historians like Georges Haupt have argued that the collapse was not a sudden event, but the result of the International's long-standing contradictions. Its pacifist strategy was built for prevention and proved useless once war was declared. Its member parties were federated and autonomous, lacking any mechanism for enforcing joint action. Furthermore, its anti-war doctrine was based on an optimistic and flawed understanding of imperialism that developed after 1912, leading its leaders to misread the political climate of 1914. They failed to appreciate that the patriotism of the masses could outweigh their class loyalty, and they were unprepared for the rapid escalation of the crisis and the psychological impact of mobilisation. The fatalistic resignation that took hold on 1 August was not a reversal of policy, but the logical outcome of a strategy that had no alternative once its primary tactic—preventing the war from starting—had failed.

The fundamental ideological division within the International was between "reformists" and "revolutionaries". Reformists, such as the German Revisionists and British Fabians, believed that socialism could be achieved gradually and peacefully through the existing democratic state, which they viewed as a neutral instrument that could be captured and used by the majority. Revolutionaries, following orthodox Marxism, held that the state was an organ of class rule that must be overthrown. This group was itself divided. The mainstream of the German SPD expected revolution to come after a long period of preparation via constitutional methods, while the revolutionary left, including Lenin and Luxemburg, anticipated a more imminent collapse of capitalism through war or economic crisis. Beyond these state-centric views, a "pluralist" and libertarian tradition, including syndicalists, co-operators, and anarchists, rejected the extension of state power and advocated for a decentralised society based on free associations of producers and consumers.

Despite its ultimate failure, the Second International left a lasting legacy. The period of its existence was what many socialists considered the "apostolic period of Socialism", a time of preaching and propagation to establish a mass movement before the assumption of political power. It established the rituals and traditions of mass social democracy—May Day, International Women's Day, and the anthem "The Internationale". In countries like Germany and Austria, it created a vibrant "society within the state", a political and cultural subculture that encompassed the entire life of its members, from choral societies and workers' libraries to a cradle-to-grave welfare system. In practice, as historian James Joll argues, Marxist social democracy was tempered by liberal ideals, giving it both strength and weakness. It left a tradition of organised political action based on a belief in democracy, humanity, and personal liberty which survived its political and theoretical failures.
