= International Socialist Congress, Amsterdam 1904 =

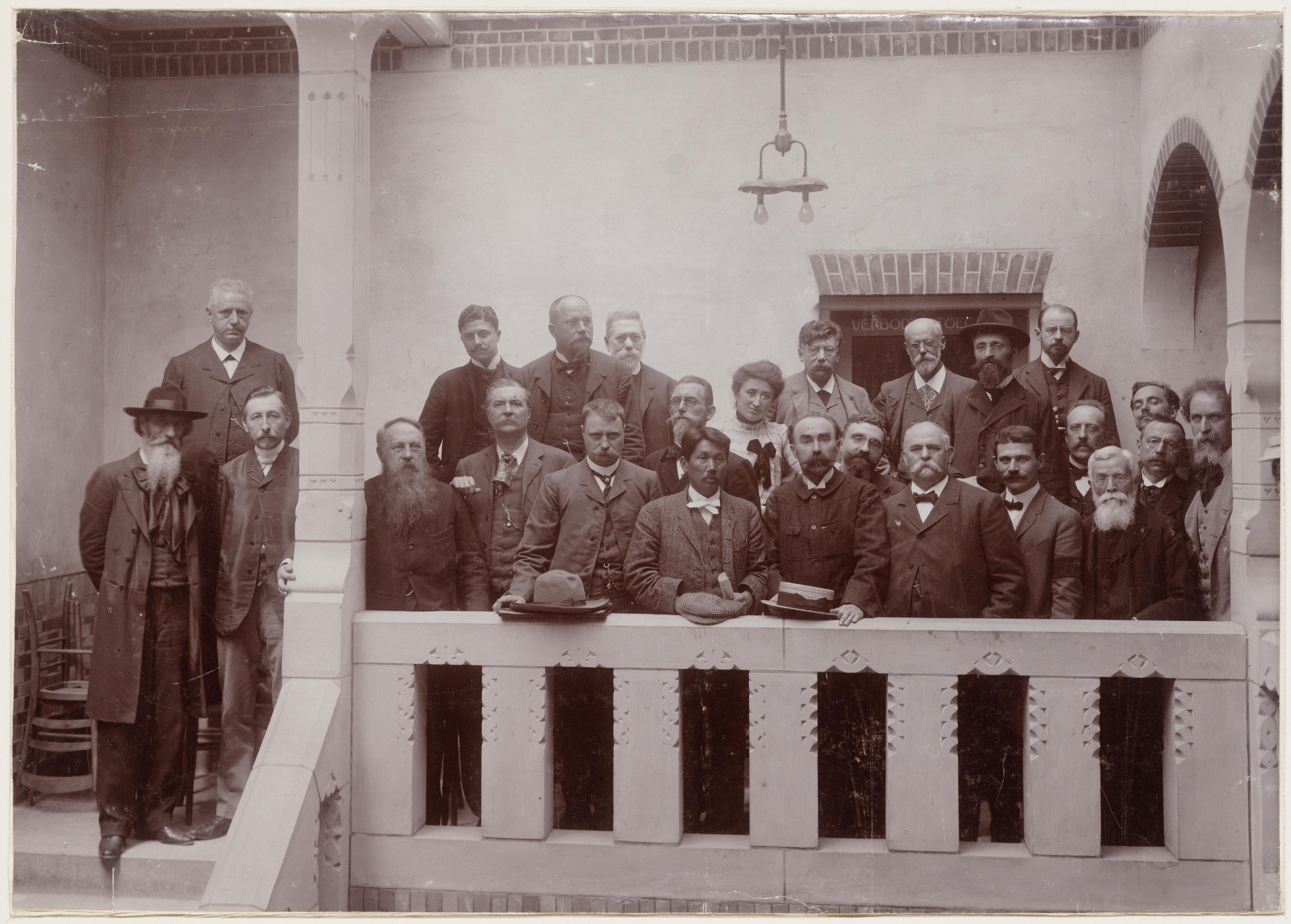
25 prominent delegates at the congress in Amsterdam

The International Socialist Congress, Amsterdam 1904 was the Sixth Congress of the Second International. It was held from 14 to 18 August 1904. The Congress was held in the 'Burcht van Berlage', Amsterdam.

This congress called on "all Social Democratic Party organisations and trade unions of all countries to demonstrate energetically on the First of May for the legal establishment of the eight-hour day, for the class demands of the proletariat, and for universal peace."
