= Socialism in Greece =

Socialism in Greece has a significant history, with various activists, politicians and political parties identifying as socialist. Socialist movements in Greece began to form around the early 20th century, most notably with the founding of the Communist Party of Greece (KKE) at the First Panhellenic Socialist Congress in 1918, but also the social-democratic Panhellenic Socialist Movement (PASOK), founded after the Metapolitefsi.

== History ==
The Panhellenic Socialist Movement (PASOK) emerged in 1974 following the military dictatorship, with Andreas Papandreou as the party's leader. PASOK established itself as a party that represented social and political change, differentiating itself from right-wing and the traditional left-wing parties. During this time, the political party New Democracy returned to governance, with Constantine Karamanlis as the Prime Minister from 1974 to 1980. In 1977, politics in Greece experienced a leftward shift, with PASOK gaining popularity and maintaining 25.2% of the vote and 93 seats in parliament.

Proceeding the 1981 election, PASOK became the first left-wing socialist party in history to govern Greece, defeating New Democracy. The previous government under New Democracy experienced various economic and administrative complications leading to a general dissatisfaction amongst various social groups. PASOK's campaign emphasised the importance of assisting “non-privileged” individuals which encompassed a large segment of the Greek population, allowing them to gain popularity. In 1981, the KKE became the third largest party and aimed to represent traditional far-left wing ideology. In 1982, PASOK's party membership increased from 60,000 during its first term in government to over 200,000 in 1982. PASOK gave more responsibilities to the local government and were “significantly expanded”, becoming responsible for waste management and renewable energy production.

In 1993, PASOK won another election, with Papandreou restoring left wing power. Papandreou was accused of nepotism and received criticism for employing family members as he gave his wife, Dimitra Liani-Papandreou, the position of director of his private political office. Three years later, Costas Simitis replaced Andreas Papandreou as the leader of PASOK after Papandreou's hospitalisation with heart disease. Simitis modernised PASOK, transforming it from a democratic socialist party to one of neoliberalist ideals. These new values and strategies were then altered due to Greece's economic crisis during 2010.

In 2000, notable socialist figure, George Papandreou, visited Turkey as the first foreign minister in 40 years. This aimed at restoring political peace between Turkey and Greece. In 2004, Costas Simitis resigned as leader of PASOK and was replaced with George Papandreou, son of Andreas Papandreou. Despite the leadership change, New Democracy won the March election. In 2004, the democratic socialist party, ‘Syriza’ was formed, led by Alekos Alavanos.

The KKE held its 17th conference in 2005, discussing the importance of the “workers’ movement”. Three years later, Greek socialists and communists around the globe celebrated the 90th anniversary of the KKE, with functions held in Australia including a celebration at the Hall of the Greek-Australian Welfare Society. Alexis Tsipras, a self-identified democratic socialist, became the leader of Syriza in 2008. Syriza went on to win the 2015 election with 145 seats in Hellenic parliament, four less than the previous election.

In 2019, Syriza won the “confidence vote” in Greek parliament proceeding upcoming elections in late May 2019. Prime minister Alexis Tsipras retained 153 votes. In late May, Tsipras called an early election for June 2019 after being defeated by New Democracy in the European parliamentary elections.

== Ideology ==
Socialism in Greece has often encompassed concepts such as anti-establishment, gender equality, communism and social progressivism. There also exists a “dualism” of ideology in socialist parties, with the KKE focusing on “pro-soviet orthodox” ideals and other parties identifying as reformist rather than distinctively communist. Historically, left-wing politics in Greece has been largely associated with communist ideology and this remains to be true in contemporary times. The “resonance of communist ideas” to certain social groups in Greece created specific socialist organisations such as the Socialist Workers’ Party of Greece, which was established in 1971. In the late 1970s, the KKE followed “rigid Marxist-Leninist” ideology whilst also supporting the Soviet Union and opposing Greece's membership with NATO.

Socialist ideology was also present within the political party PASOK as they traditionally focused on the representation of trade unions. Socialist ideologies of economic progressivism are currently apparent within the political party Syriza, the coalition of the radical left. An interview with a political representative from Syriza named Panagiotis Pantos revealed that the party actively supports gay rights, the right to seek asylum and immigration. During the height of Greece's economic recession, Syriza promised to “roll back austerity measures and renegotiate Greece's debt” and as a result, the party won the election in 2015. In early 2019, Syriza revealed that the government would be providing a range of monetary handouts due to the ongoing negative effects of the Greek economic crisis. Prime minister, Alexis Tsipras, believed that these handouts would benefit individuals that suffered the most during the economic downturn and that they would also decrease New Democracy's place in the opinion polls.

== Political Parties and Organisations ==
Name	Ideology	Description
Socialist Worker's Party of Greece	Revolutionary socialism Neo-Trotskyism	The socialist workers’ party of Greece (SEKE, as it was previously known until 1924) was established by communist ideologies and the “first trade union struggles of the working class”.
KKE	Marxism-Leninism Communism	The KKE was founded in 1918 following the socialist revolution in Russia. Since the Greek civil war in 1947, the party was banned and as a result, many members of the KKE were “scattered across the soviet bloc”. After the military dictatorship, the communist party was legalized again and were allowed to run in elections.
Panhellenic Socialist Movement (PASOK)	Social democracy	Founded in 1974 by Andreas Papandreou following the military dictatorship in Greece. It was the first traditionally left-wing party in Greece to defeat New Democracy in the 1981 election. In 2009, PASOK successfully held 44% of the vote in Hellenic parliament, however, this number fell to 5% in 2015.
Syriza	Social democracy	Syriza was founded in 2004 and at the time, was led by Alekos Alavanos. In 2009, Syriza was a minor party that only held 3% of the vote which was the minimum requirement to enter Hellenic parliament. In 2012, this number increased to 27% of the popular vote as they became the main opposition party to New Democracy. Currently, the leader of Syriza is Alexis Tsipras who took over in 2008. Syriza supports Greece's place within the Eurozone and has various objectives as a party, influenced by democratic socialist ideology. The party aims to control the banking sector, increase taxes on large corporations and “call a moratorium on debt repayments” until Greece is able to stabilize its economy.
Democratic Socialist movement	Social democracy	The Democratic Socialist Movement was founded in 2015 by George Papandreou following his split from PASOK. Papandreou resigned from PASOK in order to create a “grand coalition” between three significant parties including the Democratic Left (DIMAR), New Democracy and his old party, PASOK.
The Greek National Liberation Front (EAM)	Communism	The Greek National Liberation Front emerged during World War II after German occupants entered Greece in 1941. The movement was a resistance group that ultimately transformed into the de facto government towards the end of the war and in 1944, creating a national unity government. It was estimated that there were around 500,000 to 2,000,000 members of the Greek National Liberation Front. The ultimate aim of the movement was to unite antifascist groups in standing against the Metaxas dictatorship.
United Democratic Left (EDA)	Democratic Socialism	Founded in 1951 after the Greek civil war. The party became a “legal expression” of the KKE's communist ideals. Despite this, the party was not openly communist, however, its “generic brand of leftism” appealed to many Greek people. In the early 1960s, the EDA had an active youth subset and around 70,000 members in Greece.

== People ==
=== Andreas Papandreou ===
Andreas Papandreou was a prominent figure within Greek politics as he was the first socialist prime minister. Papandreou was in office as prime minister from 1981-1989 and again from 1993-1996 where he led the Panhellenic Socialist Movement (PASOK). Papandreou founded PASOK as well as the Panhellenic Liberation Movement (PAK) following the military dictatorship that subsided in 1974. Papandreou was the son of Georgios Papandreou, who also served as the prime minister of Greece for three terms where he put an end to right-wing governance in 1963. Andreas Papandreou also advocated for social progressivism and described himself as a “non-dogmatic Marxist”. He introduced various socialist reforms that aided low income groups, he decreased the voting age to 18 and endorsed trade unions and workers’ councils.

=== George Papandreou ===
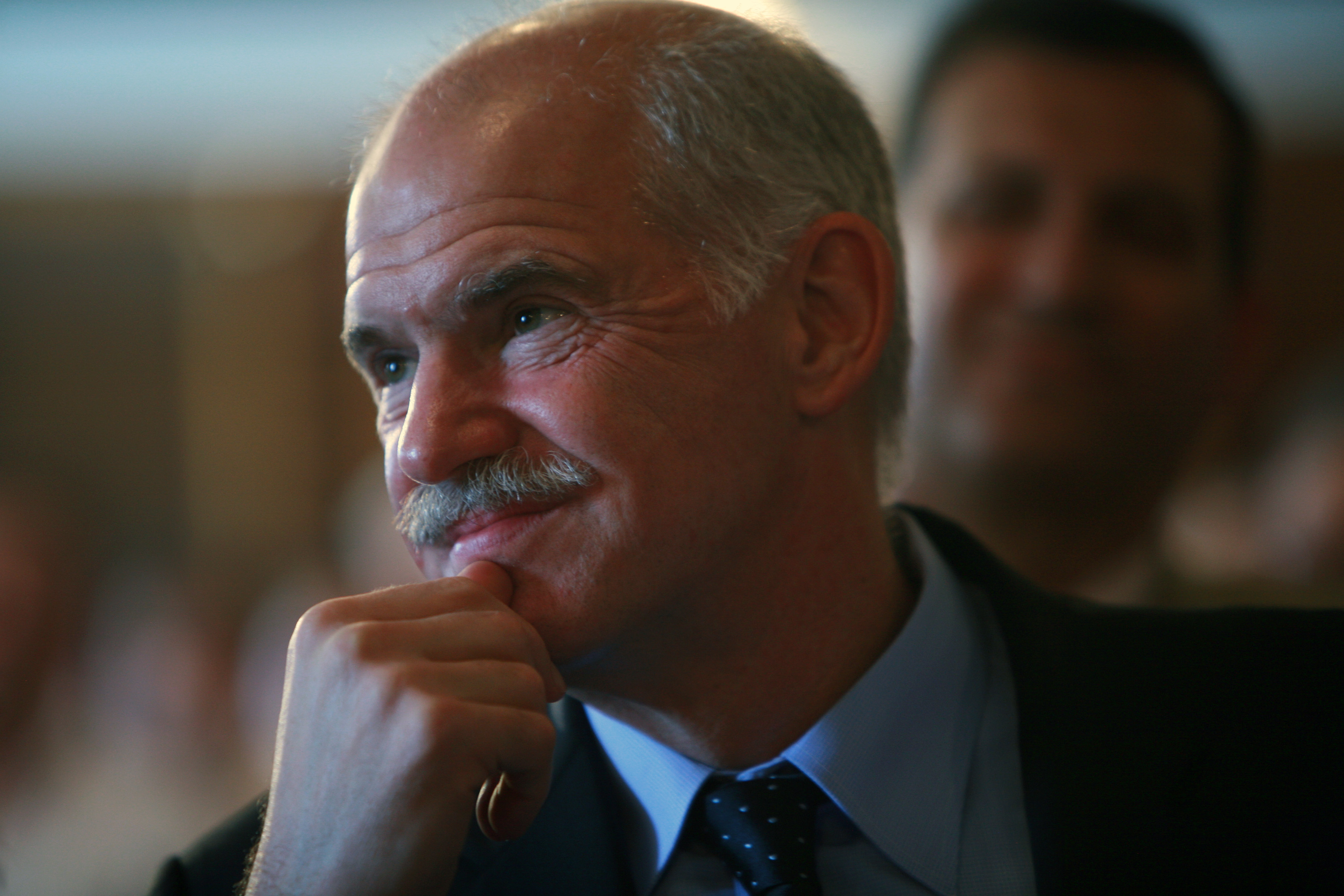
George Papandreou

George Papandreou is the second son of his family to serve as the leader of PASOK and the third one to serve as the prime minister of Greece. As a result, some claim that Papandreou was a part of “Greece's most enduring modern political dynasty”. George Papandreou led PASOK as a centre-left party until November 2011 where he was replaced by Evangelos Venizelos. In 2004, Papandreou lost the march election to New Democracy and following his resignation, he founded the political group called the “Democratic Socialist Movement”. PASOK released a statement following Papandreou's resignation stating that he was trying to destroy the party that his father had established.

=== Alexis Tsipras ===
Alexis Tsipras is a former leader of Syriza and the former prime minister of Greece (2015 - 2019). He has identified himself as a democratic socialist and has been affiliated with the communist party (before 1991). Tsipras had demonstrated his belief in democratic socialism throughout his time as prime minister. Tsipras decided to increase the minimum wage to €650 per month, that was expected to increase consumption and stimulate the economy. This 11% increase in the minimum wage is a progressive policy as it is expected to help around 800,000 Greek citizens.

=== Vasiliki Katrivanou ===
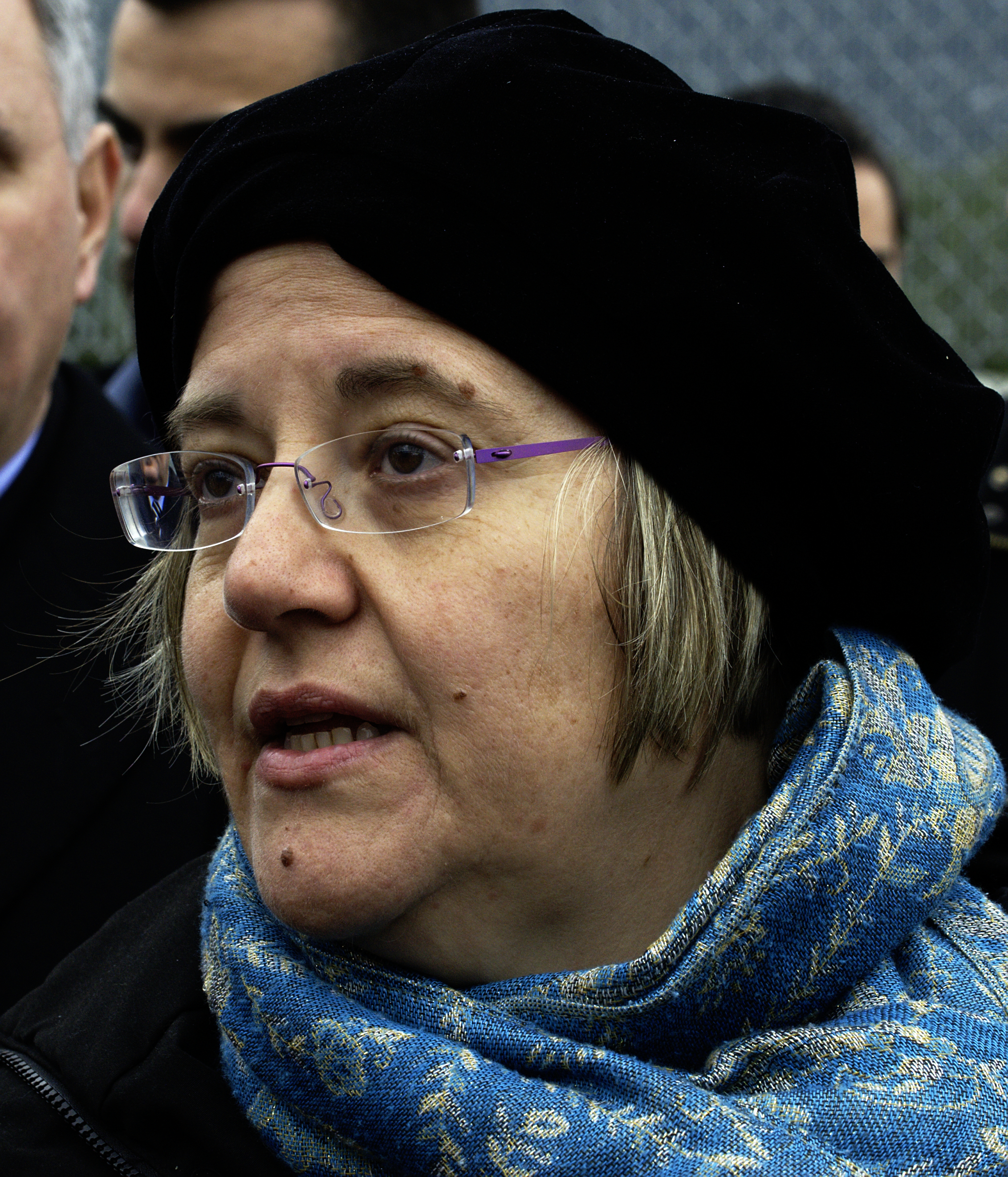
Vasiliki Katrivanou

Vasiliki Katrivanou is a Greek politician, self-identified socialist and former member of the political party Syriza. During her time involved with Syriza, Katrivanou focused on LGBTI rights, women's rights and immigration policy, often following socialist and progressive left-wing ideology. For example, in 2015, Syriza legislated for civil partnership recognition for same-sex couples, with Katrivanou stating that it was a step towards achieving “legal equality in Greece”.

=== Aleka Papariga ===
Aleka Papariga is a greek retired politician and communist who served as the General Secretary of the KKE for 22 years (from 1991 to 2013), making her the longest serving political leader in Greece. She is notable for managing to keep the KKE united and strong after a series of splits, defeating the revisionist faction inside the KKE and posthumously reinstating Nikos Zachariadis, Aris Velouchiotis and Nikos Ploumpidis.

== Criticisms ==
=== Failure to effect change ===
While Syriza has been in office, the party has faced various criticisms, including its failure to effect change in Greece and improve the state of the economy. Critics of Syriza's socialist policies have claimed that the party has failed to "deliver on its promises" such as removing austerity measures and assisting the large majority of financially disadvantaged citizens. In 2016, a year after Alexis Tsipras was elected as Prime Minister, Syriza implemented the austerity measures that the party campaigned against prior to their electoral victory. Others have also criticised the division present within Syriza, as various politicians in the party disagree with each other in regards to Greece's affiliation within the Eurozone.

=== Populism ===
Populist policy is also a prominent criticism of socialist organisations, particularly PASOK and Syriza. Following the military dictatorship in the early 1970s, PASOK often appealed to the "non-privileged" citizens of Greece by advocating for social justice issues and for standing up against capitalist establishments that upheld economic privilege. Andreas Papandreou managed to adopt a populist rhetoric and emphasised socialist and nationalist ideologies which enabled him to gain support for PASOK and win the election in 1981. However, critics claim that Greece is an example of a "populist experiment" evidenced by PASOK and Syriza's failure to improve the state of economic affairs in Greece.

=== Opposing organisations ===
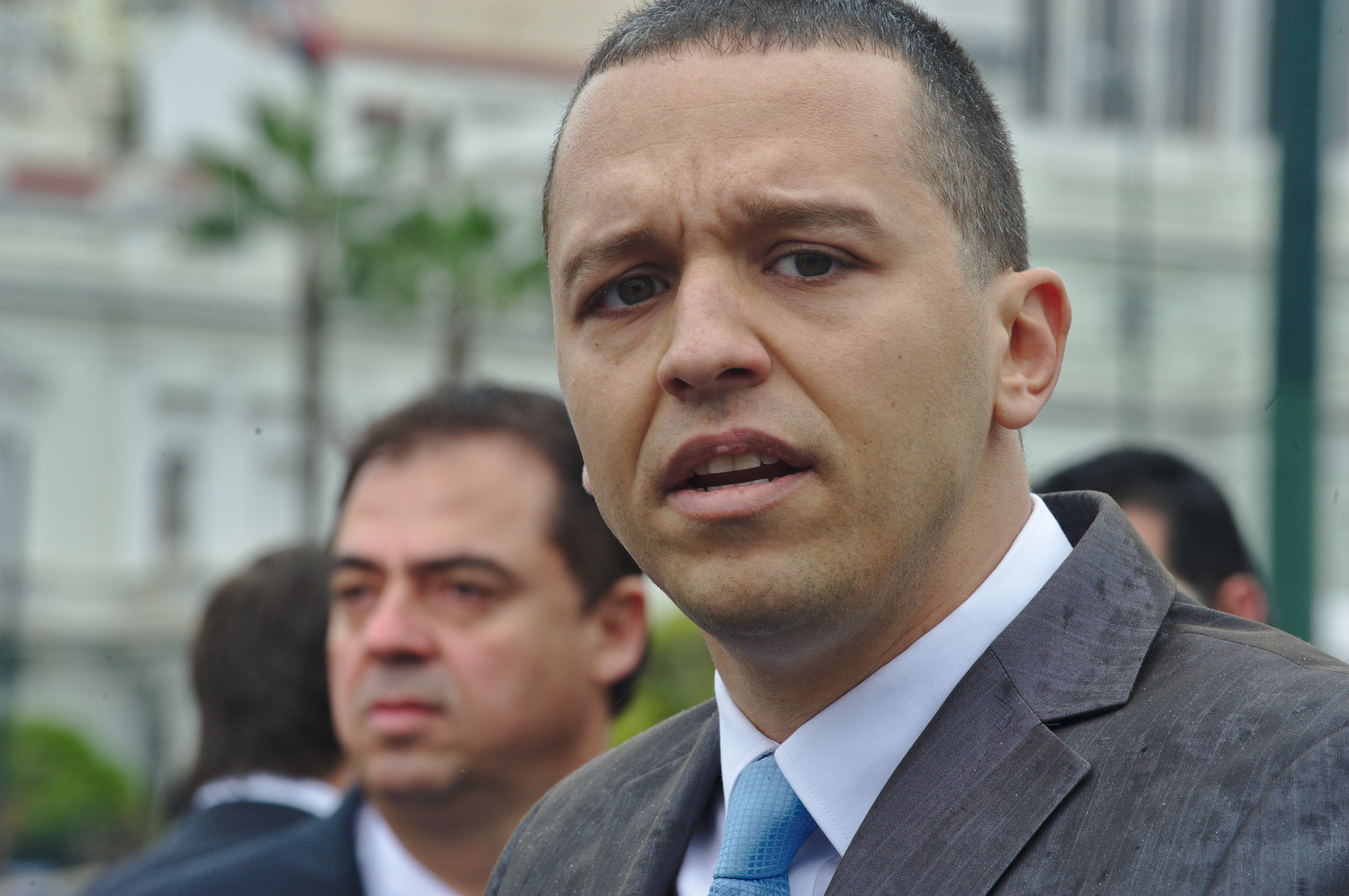
Ilias Kasidiaris

The shortcomings of socialism have given rise to support for right-wing parties and the "resurgent in right-wing politics, economic stagnation and popular disenchantment". For example, Golden Dawn and LAOS have criticized socialism and socialist policies in Greece. A former socialist minister was violently assaulted by Golden Dawn supporters on the 45th anniversary of the 1967 military dictatorship. In addition, Golden Dawn minister Ilias Kasidiaris expressed his contempt for socialist ideology after he assaulted Liana Kanelli, a communist politician, on live television.

== See also ==
- Politics of Greece
- Communism
- Democratic socialism
- List of democratic socialist parties and organizations
- List of communist parties
- Types of socialism
- Criticism of socialism
