= Yanis Kordatos =

Greek Marxist historian, sociologist and politician

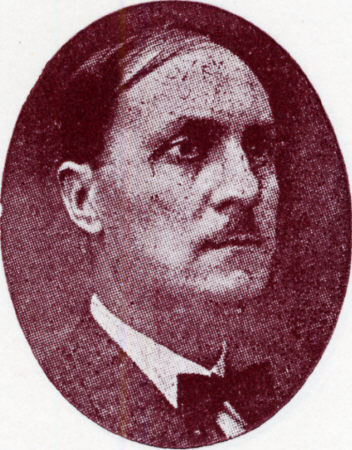
- Yanis Kordatos in 1936
- Born: 1 February 1891; Zagora, Greece
- Died: 29 April 1961 (aged 70); Athens, Greece
- Education: University of Athens
- Occupations: Historian, sociologist, politician
- Political party: Communist Party of Greece

Yanis Kordatos (Greek: Γιάνης Κορδάτος; 1 February 1891 – 29 April 1961) was a Greek Marxist historian, sociologist and politician. Kordatos wrote over twenty historical works dealing with Ancient, Byzantine, and Modern Greek history. Some of his most notable books include A History of Greek Literature from 1453-1961 (1962), The Last Days of the Byzantine Empire (1975), A History of Ancient Greek Philosophy (1946, 1975), The Commune of Thessalonica (Salonika), 1342-1349 (1975), and The Social Meaning of the Greek War of Independence of 1821 (1972). He is considered the father of Greek Marxist historiography.

== Early life ==
Kordatos was born on February 1, 1891, in Zagora, Greece. His father Alexandros, was a merchant. He studied at Smyrna (Izmir)'s Graeco-German Lyceum in 1907. In 1908, he studied at the Franco-Hellenic Lyceum in Constantinople (Istanbul). Kordatos also studied law at the University of Athens in 1911.

== Political career ==
Kordatos was a member of the Central Committee of the Socialist Labour Party of Greece (SEKE), and for a short period of time in 1922 as the party's general secretary as well as the editor of the party newspaper Rizospastis.

In 1922, along with other leaders of the party and the General Confederation of Greek Workers, he was arrested twice for anti-war newspaper articles and anti-monarchist activities. In 1924, Kordatos, along with Thomas Apostolidis and Seraphim Maximus, entered the so-called "Central Committee of three people", which led the party until the III Extraordinary Congress in November and December. The Socialist Labour Party of Greece-Communist renamed the Communist Party of Greece (KKE) the same year.

At the end of 1924 he left the KKE as he disagreed with after its full alignment with the decisions of the Communist International on the Macedonian issue. For a while He remained on the side of the party, but after Nikos Zachariadis took over the position of general secretary, he came under heavy criticism. The leader of the new leadership, Yanis Zevgos, launched a series of attacks in 1933, calling him a " bourgeois historian" and an "economist on the front lines of the counter-revolution." Kordatos reacted strongly with a series of other articles which, as he wrote shortly before his death, criticized "the new leadership of the Party that roughly and schematically interpreted Leninism" while claiming "that the KKE leaders took the wrong path".

At the end of 1940, he was arrested by the regime of Metaxas in the early days of the Greco-Italian War. During the occupation, he took part in the Resistance Movement in the ranks of the National Liberation Front (EAM). After World War II, he became a member of the General Council of the United Democratic Left (EDA). Although his disagreements with the KKE softened during the anti-fascist struggle of the war years, their relationship was never fully restored.

== Later life ==
After retiring from active politics he devoted himself almost exclusively to historical and sociological research, publishing numerous independent studies and publishing numerous articles, commentaries and book reviews. As a columnist, during the interwar period, he collaborated mainly with left-wing literary and cultural magazines.

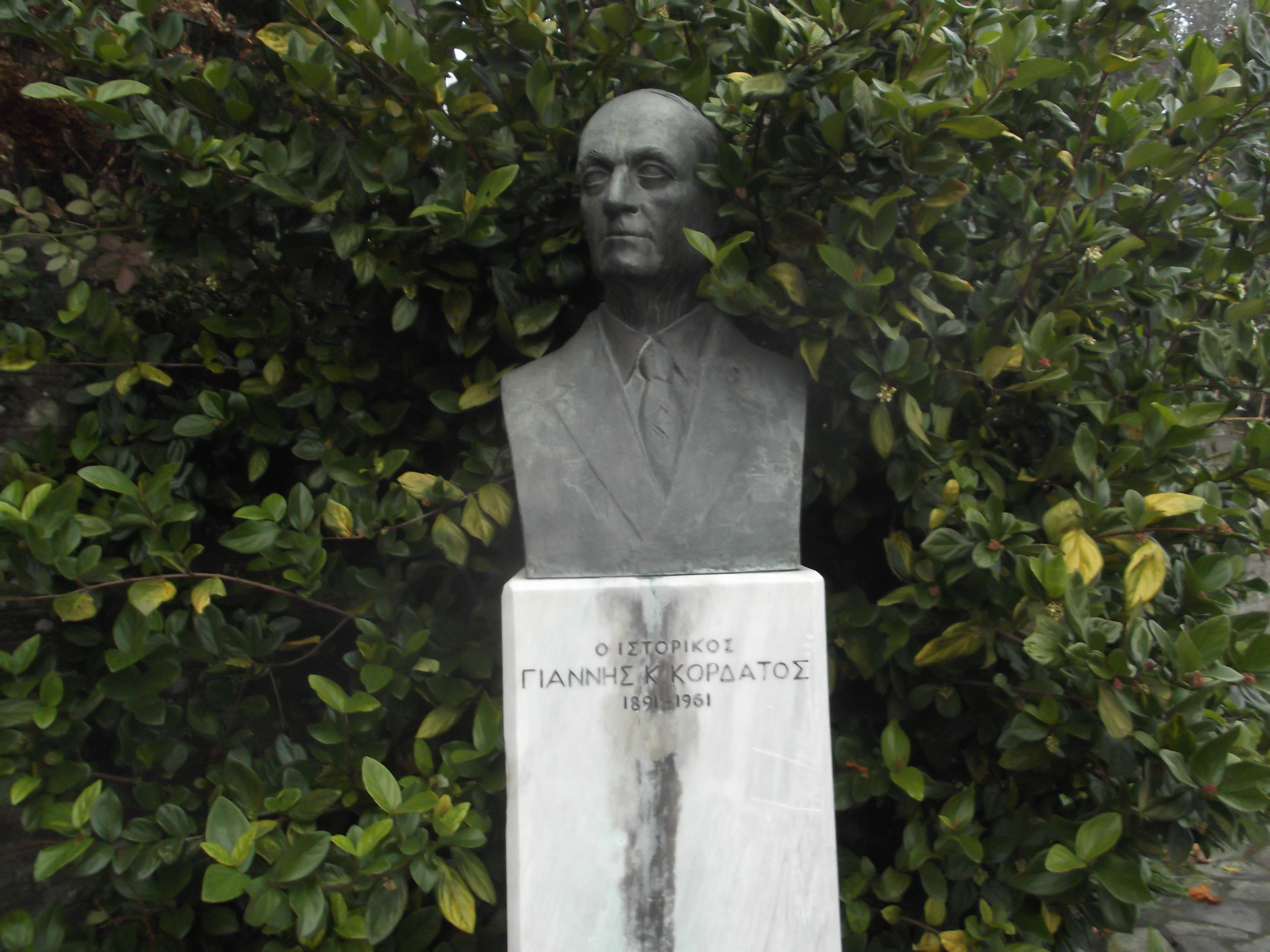
Bust of Kordatos in Zagora

He died suddenly of a heart attack on April 30, 1961, while in his office. He was preparing an article about the celebration of May Day, in order to be published in the newspaper I Avgi. His funeral took place in the cemetery of Kallithea and was attended by many people, while a delegation of the EDA also attended.
