= Dimitris Koutsoumpas =

Greek politician (born 1955)

Dimitris Koutsoumbas
- Δημήτρης Κουτσούμπας
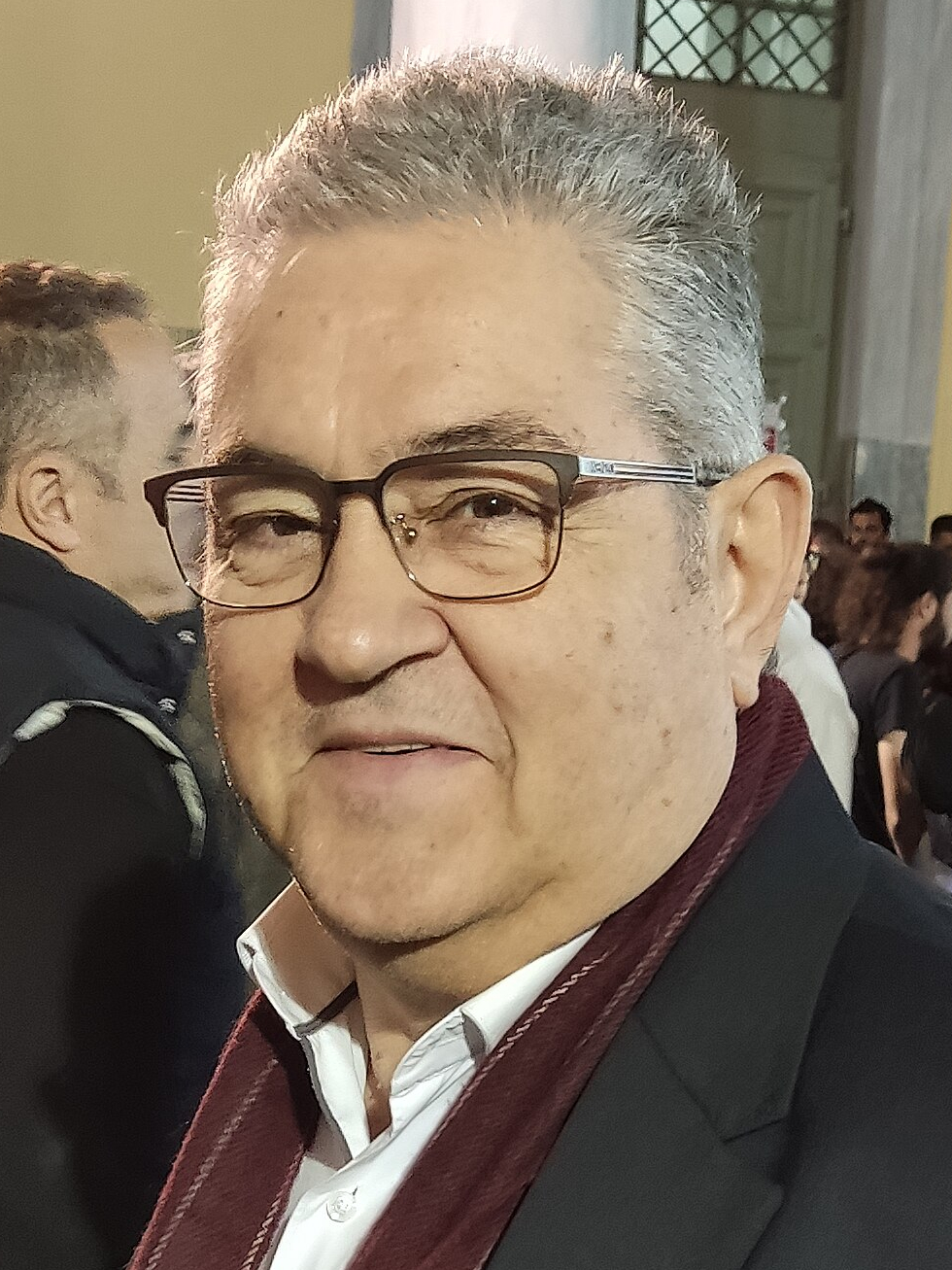
- Koutsoumbas in 2023

18th General Secretary of the Communist Party of Greece
- Incumbent
- Assumed office 14 April 2013
- Preceded by: Aleka Papariga

4th Leader of the Communist Party Parliamentary Group
- Incumbent
- Assumed office 25 January 2015
- Preceded by: Aleka Papariga

Member of the Hellenic Parliament
- Incumbent
- Assumed office 25 January 2015
- Constituency: Athens B

Personal details
- Born: 10 August 1955 (age 71) Lamia, Kingdom of Greece
- Party: Communist Party of Greece
- Spouse: Anastasia Kontogianni (m. 1993)
- Children: 1
- Education: National and Kapodistrian University of Athens
- Occupation: Politician; Lawyer

Dimitrios Koutsoumbas (Greek: Δημήτριος Κουτσούμπας; born 10 August 1955), known as Dimitris Koutsoumbas (Δημήτρης Κουτσούμπας, pronounced [ðiˈmitris kuˈt͡sumbas]) is a Greek Marxist-Leninist politician and member of the Hellenic Parliament who has been the General Secretary of the Communist Party of Greece (KKE) since 14 April 2013.

== Early life and education ==
Koutsoumbas was born on 10 August 1955 in Lamia, Greece. His family were militants in the Greek resistance as part of the National Liberation Front, and some of them were executed by the Nazi troops during the Axis occupation of Greece or by the military courts in the period of the Greek Civil War; the rest were imprisoned and exiled. His father, Apostolis Koutsoumbas, a member of the KKE, was exiled for his political actions; he was arrested in 1945 in Larissa, tried, imprisoned, and exiled for eight years. Koutsoumbas graduated from high school in June 1973, took the Apolytirion (Panhellenic entrance exam) and studied law. He entered the Law Department of the National and Kapodistrian University of Athens.

== Political career ==
Koutsoumbas participated in the Athens Polytechnic uprising against the Regime of the Colonels in November 1973 and joined the outlawed Communist Youth of Greece (KNE) in December. In 1987, Koutsoumbas was elected for the first time to the Central Committee of the KKE, to which he was reelected in the following years. In 1996, he was elected for the first time to the central committee's political bureau. In the same year, he became the director of Rizospastis, the official newspaper of the party, in which post he remained for the following decade. During his political career, he was also the head of the International Relations Section of the Central Committee. He was a candidate in the parliamentary elections of 2000 and 2007 for the Boeotia prefecture but was not elected.

At the 19th Party Congress on 14 April 2013, Koutsoumbas was elected as the General Secretary of the Central Committee, succeeding Aleka Papariga. Since January 2015, he has been a member of the Hellenic Parliament. In October 2023, he emerged as the most popular political figure in the country for the first time according to a poll by Metron Analysis for Mega TV, with a 47% approval rating, ahead of the incumbent prime minister Kyriakos Mitsotakis at 44%.

== Works ==
Koutsoumbas was the director of the newspaper Rizospastis, the Organ of the Central Committee of the KKE, from May 1996 when he was elected to the Political Bureau, until 2006. Holding the position of the General Secretary of the Central Committee, he continued to write numerous articles and deliver speeches.

=== Translated articles ===
- The significance of the October Revolution in the era of the transition from capitalism to socialism-communism (In International Communist Review, 2017)
- We draw conclusions, we become stronger (In Sovetskaya Rossiya, 2017)
- The new, yet very old, "Great Idea" of the European capital and the communists' response (In Rizospastis, 2020)
- We are moving into the new phase with greater vigilance, taking advantage of the experience and possibilities for an ideological - political counterattack and rallying of popular forces to the Party (In Rizospastis, 2020)
- We make a vanguard contribution to the reinforcement of the current disputing the dominant policy among the people by intensifying our ideological - political - organizational action (In Rizospastis, 2023)

=== Translated speeches ===
- At event of the Communist Party (Italy) on the 98th anniversary of the October Revolution in Rome, 2015
- At the 19th International Meeting of Communist and Workers' Parties (IMCWP) in St. Petersburg, 2017
- At the teleconference of the European Communist Initiative (ECI) on the 100th anniversary of the USSR, 2022
- At the founding meeting of the European Communist Action (ECA) in Athens, 2023
- At anti-imperialist rally in Athens, 2024
- At the 50th KNE-Odigitis Festival at the Tritsis Park, 2024
- At Brussels meeting of European communists, 2024
- At the hybrid meeting of the ECA in Berlin, 2025
- At Party event in Larissa, 2025
- At concert at the Panathenaic Stadium commemorating Mikis Theodorakis, 2025 (excerpts)
- At the 51st KNE-Odigitis Festival in Thessaloniki, 2025 (excerpts)

== Personal life ==
Koutsoumbas is married to Anastasia Kontogianni and has a daughter. His grandfather was a priest and a participant in the Greek resistance. He is a supporter of Olympiacos.

Party political offices
| Preceded by Aleka Papariga | General Secretary of the Communist Party of Greece; Since 2013 | Incumbent |
Order of precedence
| Preceded by Nikos Androulakis as President of the PASOK – KINAL | Order of precedence of Greece; General Secretary of the Communist Party | Succeeded by Kyriakos Velopoulos as President of the Greek Solution |
