= George Zervanos =

Greek operatic tenor

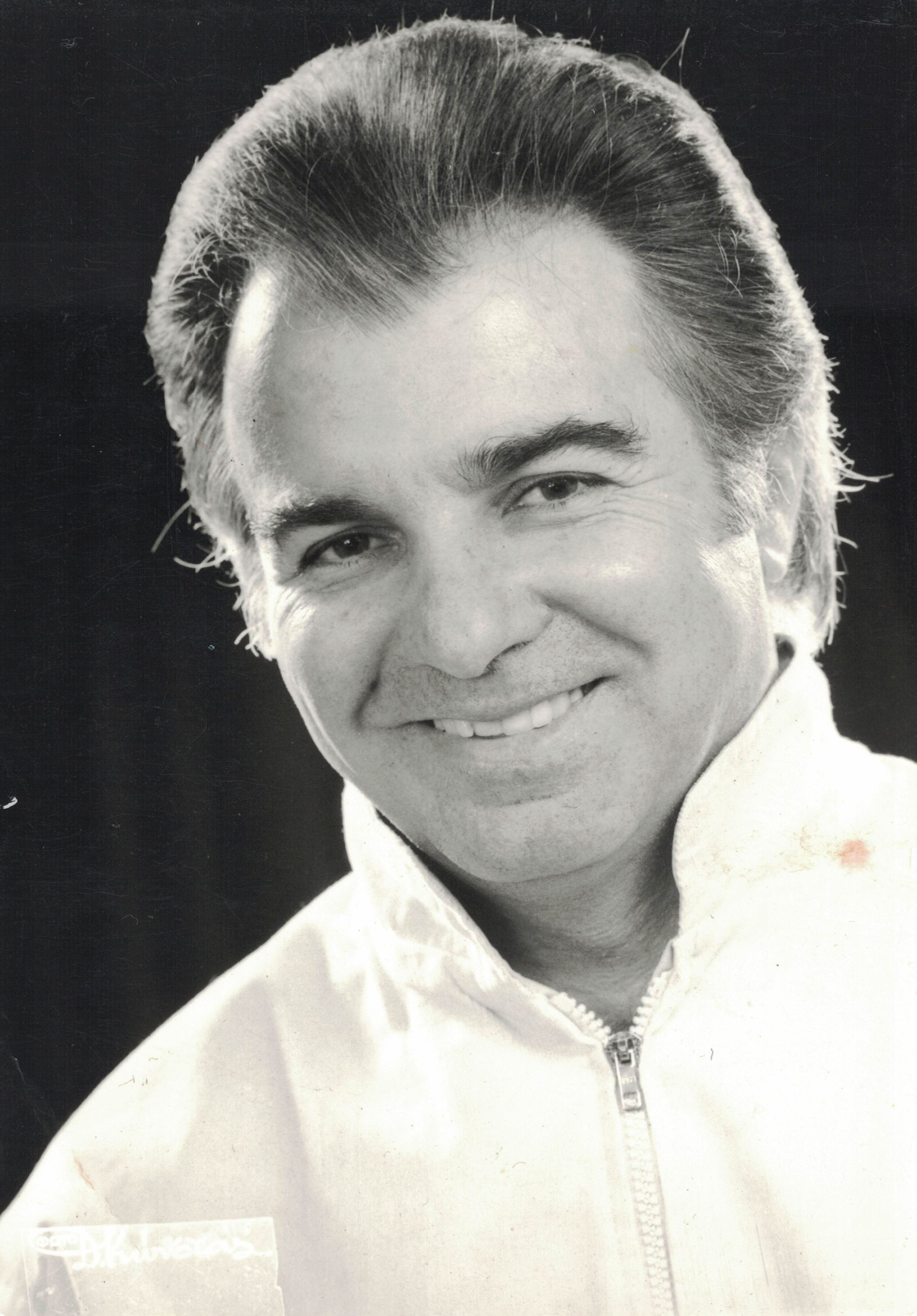
George Zervanos

George (or Giorgos) Zervanos (Greek: Γιώργος Ζερβάνος) (May 1, 1930 – October 5, 2006) was a Greek operatic tenor.

== Early life ==
The great Greek tenor George Zervanos was born in Kos, Greece, in 1930. He studied with Kiki Vlachou in Athens and went on to study in depth with L. Guarrini and E. Campogalliani in Milan, and J. Hauschild and H. Arnold in Munich. He won four scholarships from Greece, Italy and Germany (Municipality of Bavarian region and DAAD) as well as Medals and First Prizes in many international vocal competitions.

== Career ==
He sang as a soloist in Italy, Germany, Belgium, Spain, Switzerland, Austria, England. His performances as Rodolfo in "La Bohème" between 1967 - 1973, where he sang 38 times in more than 20 opera houses of Germany, were praised enthusiastically by the press. In 1974 he was engaged by the Greek National Opera where he sang leading roles in the operas of Verdi, Puccini, Mascagni, Leoncavallo, Wagner, Massenet, Ravel, Mussorgsky, as well as a great spectrum of Greek operatic repertoire by Samaras, Sklavos, Xirelis, etc. At the same time he taught in all the major conservatories of Athens, Greece. For 30 years, he was an outstanding teacher of a large number of students many of whom are now established singers leading carriers in Greek and European Opera houses. He was married to the Greek soprano, Martha Arapis. Together, they had two children (Alexios and Lydia).

== Sources ==
- Dontas, Nikos A. (7 February 2003), "Neglected work is re-enacted". Kathimerini
- Eleftherotypia (9 October 2006). "Πέθανε ο τενόρος" ("Tenor Dies") (in Greek)
- Rizospastis (10 October 2006). "Λυρική απώλεια" ("Loss to Opera") (in Greek)
