= Nikos Boyiopoulos =

Greek journalist and political editor

Nikos Boyiopoulos (Greek: Νίκος Μπογιόπουλος; born 1967) is a Greek journalist and political editor. He had been editing in Rizospastis from 1992 to 2013.

== Biography ==
He studied in the University of Athens economics and has also co-operated with numerous magazines, newspapers and websites. There was a time after the creation of NAR in which he was adjacent to this particular party, but soon after, he joined the Communist Party of Greece (KKE). He is a major representative of KKE in radio shows and TV talk shows, and he is widely known for using numerical data in order to prove a point and citing sources through documents. In his targets have been from time to time the PA.SO.K. governments, the rightist party LA.O.S, the Chamber of Greek Industrialists, foreign policy of the United States, the anti-immigration sentiment and politics, while accusing several Antiauthoritarians of having close ties with or even being agents of the CIA or EYP.
