= Demosthenes Ligdopoulos =

Greek activist and newspaper editor (1898–1920)

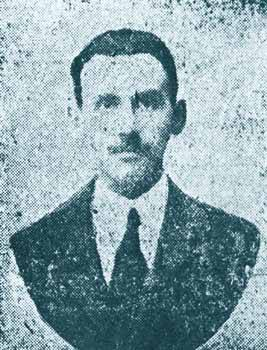
- Born: 1898; Athens, Kingdom of Greece
- Died: 25 October 1920 (aged 21–22); Black Sea
- Occupation: Journalist

Demosthenes Ligdopoulos (Greek: Δημοσθένης Λιγδόπουλος; 1898–1920) was a Greek socialist activist and newspaper editor who was a founding member of the Communist Party of Greece.

== Biography ==
Born in Athens in 1898 into a family of humble background, Ligdopoulos entered the University of Athens as a student of mathematics in 1916. In the same year, Ligdopoulos, together with his fellow students and friends, founded the Socialist Youth of Athens, which gathered many young people in its ranks, especially after the outbreak of the October Revolution. Ligdopoulos and many of his comrades were arrested by the Greek authorities for publishing left-wing literature but were released with a pardon given by the government of Eleftherios Venizelos because of international outcry.

Ligdopoulos and his comrades from the Socialist Youth of Athens played a leading role in the proceedings of the founding conference of the Socialist Workers' Party of Greece (SEKE), the predecessor of the Communist Party of Greece, which took take place in Piraeus in November 1918. Forming the left of the political trend of the conference together with Nikos Dimitratos, who will be elected secretary of the Central Committee of the SEKE.

At the first Session of the National Council of the SEKE (May 1919) a decision was taken to withdraw the party from the Second International and prepare the ground, so that it could join the Third International (Comintern). The decision was the result of an intense confrontation between two wings. The left led by Ligdopoulos, Dimitratos and M. Sideris who supported the integration into the Comintern and the opposition group of the right-wing faction of Avraam Benaroia and Aristotelis Sideris.

In January 1920, Ligdopoulos represented SEKE at the conference of the Balkan Communist and Socialist Parties in Sofia, where the Balkan Communist Federation was founded. He was then sent as a party representative to Moscow to participate in the 2nd Congress of the Comintern and to include the SEKE in its ranks. Ligdopoulos was chosen for this mission because he spoke French and was an ardent supporter of joining the Comintern.

After the end of the conference, Ligdopoulos together with Alexakis at the end of October 1920 arrived in Odessa and boarded a ship to return to Greece. They were murdered during the journey to the Black Sea by Turkish smugglers of Laz origin, and their bodies were dumped near the Bulgarian coast. There is no exact date of their death, although different ones have been written from time to time (October 21 or 25 or 27, 1920).

== Sources ==
- Mottas, Nikos, Demosthenes Ligdopoulos, Greece's first communist hero, In Defense of Communism, 5 November 2021.
