= Panspoudastiki =

Panspoudastiki Kinisi Synergasias (PKS, Greek: Πανσπουδαστική Κίνηση Συνεργασίας, All Student Cooperation Movement) is the Communist Youth of Greece's (KNE) major branch in Greek universities which is affiliated with the Communist Party of Greece.

The group was founded shortly after the restoration of democracy in 1974 and the fall of the regime of the colonels. The newly appointed Karamanlis cabinet legalized Communist Party of Greece (KKE) shortly after its inauguration in 1975. KKE became a legitimate party after a period of political isolation that lasted from 1949 to 1975. Its legitimization was also a historical reconciliation between the two opposing factions of the Greek civil war. This movement played a vital role in the fight against the seven-year-long junta. PKS members were major participants during the 1973 Athens Students Polytechnic Uprising which played a role in the junta's fall.

Panspoudastiki K.S. is supported by thousands of students. In May 2026, the PKS won student union elections for the fifth year in a row. In 2026, they won 19,632 votes, which was 35.04% of the total vote. It purports to fight for the prosperity and the education of Greek students, especially those from poor backgrounds. The PKS finds itself at odds with other left-wing and socialist parties in Greece like the Panhellenic Socialist Movement (PASOK), the New Democracy (ND) party, and SYN/SYRIZA. The Communist Party of Greece, with which the PKS is affiliated, will not enter into any party alliances until Greece is a socialist country by their definition.

Panspoudastiki K.S. supports free university for Greek students. It also claims to support athleticism, entertainment, environmental protection, democratic rights, the peace movement against imperialism and the fight against all kinds of drugs.

== See also ==
- Communist Party of Greece
- Communist Youth of Greece
