= Nikos Ploumpidis =

Greek communist (1902–1954)

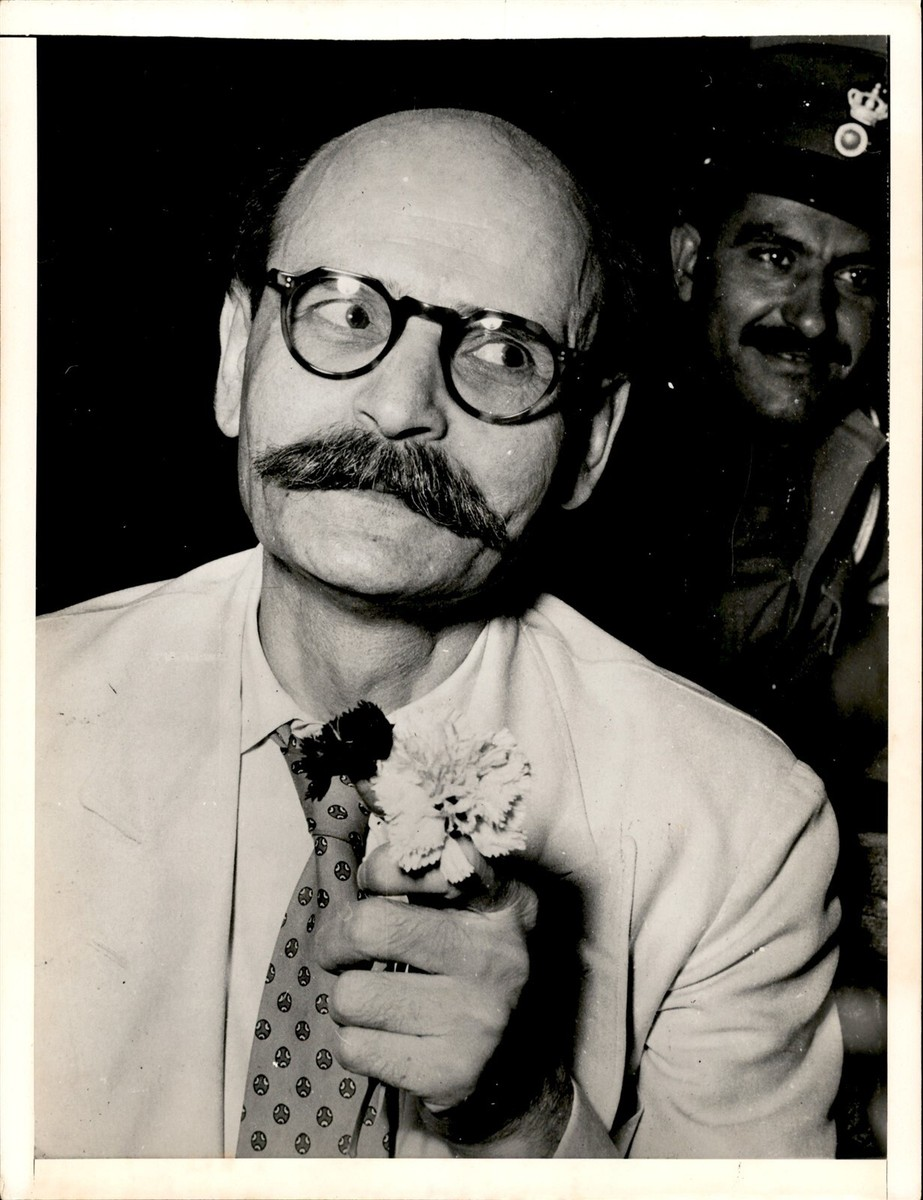
Ploumpidis at his trial in Athens, 1953

Nikos Ploumpidis (also Ploumbidis) (Greek: Νίκος Πλουμπίδης) (31 December 1902 – 14 August 1954) was in the leading cadre of the Greek Communist Party during the Second World War and a famous member of the wartime anti-Nazi resistance.

The son of a poor farming family, he was born in Arcadian Langadia. As a young man he involved himself in politics and in 1926, as a teacher in the village of Milea, near Elassona, he joined the Communist Party of Greece (KKE). At the time he was a teacher and in 1930 became a member of the Executive Committee of the Central Union of Civil Servants. However, in 1931 he had to leave the position after he was sacked from his teaching position due to his political activism. He began to work full-time for the KKE. In 1937 he was responsible for the party in the Thessaly region, and in 1938, he was elected to the Politburo of the KKE.

In 1939 he was arrested by the secret police of the regime of General Ioannis Metaxas, and was imprisoned in Sotiria hospital until his escape in 1942. He then involved himself in the newly formed National Liberation Front (EAM) and in the communist youth organisation (OKNE). After the return of Nikos Zachariadis, the pre-war general secretary of the KKE, from his incarceration in Dachau Concentration Camp, tensions developed between him and Ploumpidis. Owing to poor health (he suffered from tuberculosis), in 1945 Ploumpidis resigned from the Politburo and took over the administration of the party's finances. Unlike many other KKE leaders, Ploumpidis remained in Greece after the Greek Civil War (1946–49) and was reportedly instrumental in establishing the United Democratic Left (EDA) party, essentially a proxy party of the now illegal KKE.

In 1952, he was arrested by the secret police. After a three-week trial, he was found guilty on 3 August 1953 and sentenced to death. At the same time, the exiled KKE Central Committee under Zachariadis expelled Ploumpidis from the party on the grounds that he was, supposedly, a secret police spy and British agent. These allegations were repeatedly broadcast on the party's Moscow-based radio station, Free Greece. On 14 August 1954, Ploumpidis was executed by firing squad in Agia Marina, near Dafni. The Greek government released a photo of his execution in the Greek press. Rizospastis and I Avgi, the two leading left-wing newspapers, refused to publish the photos following KKE's allegations that the execution was faked and Ploumpidis was actually now free and spending the money he took for his treason.

In 1958, after the de-Stalinisation of the KKE, the party acknowledged the expulsion of Ploumpidis as a grave mistake and rehabilitated him with the following declaration: "Resolved that the General Meeting of the Central Committee restores the memory of comrades Giorgos Siantos, Nikos Ploumbidis (Barbas) and Kostas Gyftodimos (Karajorgis). There exists no documents to support the claim that the accused were provocateurs or spies, as the former leadership under N. Zachariadis claimed in relation to the above-mentioned comrades."
