= Communist Party of Greece =

Political party in Greece

Communist Party of Greece Κομμουνιστικό Κόμμα Ελλάδας
- Abbreviation: KKE
- General Secretary: Dimitris Koutsoumpas
- Founders: List: Demosthenes Ligdopoulos Stamatis Kokkinos Michael Sideris Nikos Demetratos Nikos Giannios Avraam Benaroya Michael Oikonomou Spyros Komiotis Giorgos Pispinis Aristos Arvanitis
- Founded: 17 November 1918 [O.S. 4 November] as "SEKE"; 1924; 102 years ago adopted its current name
- Legalised: 1974; 52 years ago
- Banned: 1936; 90 years ago
- Headquarters: 145 Leof. Irakliou, 142 31 Athens (Nea Ionia)
- Newspaper: Rizospastis
- Student wing: Panspoudastiki
- Youth wing: Young Communist League of Greece (1922-1943); Communist Youth of Greece
- Trade union wing: All-Workers Militant Front
- Ideology: Communism; Marxism-Leninism; Anti-revisionism; Hard Euroscepticism
- Political position: Far-left
- National affiliation: National Liberation Front (1941–1946); Provisional Democratic Government (1947–1949); Coalition of the Left and Progress (1989–1991)
- European affiliation: European Communist Action (since 2023); INITIATIVE (2013–2023)
- European Parliament group: Non-Inscrits
- International affiliation: International Meeting of Communist and Workers' Parties (IMCWP) (Note: The party was formerly part of the Communist International (Comintern; 1920–1943).)
- Slogan: Προλετάριοι όλων των χωρών, ενωθείτε! ('Proletarians of all countries, unite!')
- Anthem: The Internationale
- Parliament: 21 / 300
- European Parliament: 2 / 21
- Regional governors: 0 / 13
- Mayors: 6 / 332

Election symbol

Party flag
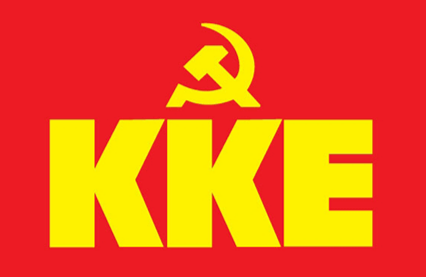

Website
- kke.gr
- Politics of Greece; Political parties; Elections; A: The party is also described as left-conservative, or left-authoritarian, given its conservative stances on social issues.

The Communist Party of Greece, (Note: Greek: Κομμουνιστικό Κόμμα Ελλάδας, romanized: Kommounistikó Kómma Elládas, KKE) also known by its acronym KKE, is a Marxist–Leninist political party in Greece. It was founded in 1918 as the Socialist Workers' Party of Greece (SEKE) (Note: Greek: Σοσιαλιστικό Εργατικό Κόμμα Ελλάδος – Sosialistikó Ergatikó Kómma Elládos. After the party's admission to the Communist International in 1920, it changed its full name to Socialist Workers' Party of Greece (Communist) (SEKE (K)).) and adopted its current name in November 1924. It is the oldest political party in modern Greek politics to still be active.

The party was banned in 1936, but played a significant role in the Greek resistance and the Greek Civil War, and its membership peaked in the mid-1940s. Legalization of the KKE was restored following the fall of the Greek Junta in 1974. The party has achieved appointing MPs in all elections since its restoration in 1974, and took part in a coalition government in 1989 when it got more than 13% of the vote. Ever since the 13th Congress of the KKE in 1991, the party has rejected "participation in and support of bourgeois governments", claiming the restoration of its revolutionary characteristics and denouncing the coalition government of 1989.

The KKE participates in the International Meeting of Communist and Workers' Parties (IMCWP) and the European Communist Action (ECA).

The KKE describes itself as a revolutionary party that wants to build a socialist-communist society through the dictatorship of the proletariat. In addition to being a communist party, it has also been described as Stalinist, nationalist or left-wing nationalist, economic nationalist, socially conservative, culturally conservative, and anti-imperialist.

== History ==
=== Foundation ===
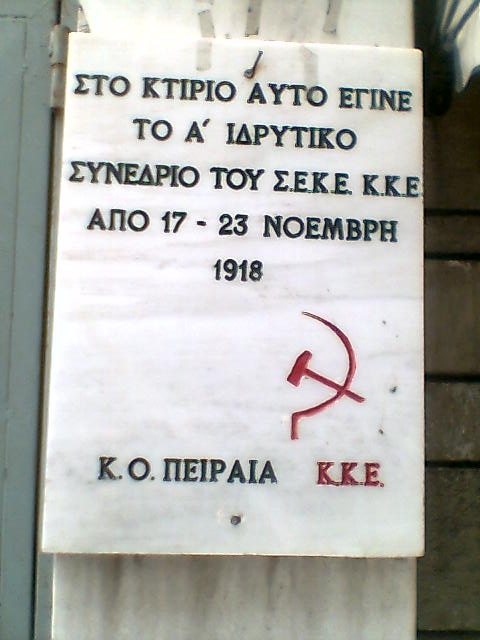
Plaque at the building of Piraeus, where the first congress and foundation of the party was held

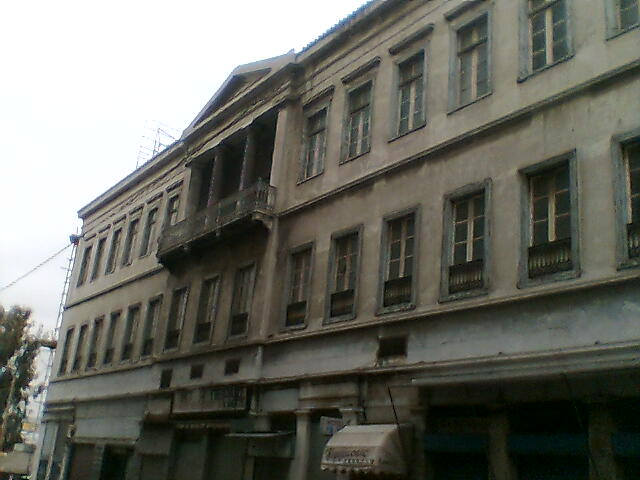
View of the Piraeus building

The October Revolution of the Bolsheviks in Russia in 1917 gave impetus for the foundation of communist parties in many countries globally. The KKE was founded on 17 November 1918 by Aristos Arvanitis, Demosthenes Ligdopoulos, Stamatis Kokkinos, Michael Sideris, Nikos Dimitratos, and others. The party was run by a five-member Central Committee which initially consisted of Dimitratos, Ligdopoulos, Sideris, Arvanitis and Kokkinos, and had a three-member Audit Committee initially including George Pispinis, Spyros Koumiotis, and Avraam Benaroya. Ligdopoulos was elected director of the party's official newspaper, Ergatikos Agon.

The background of the KKE has roots in more than 60 years of small socialist, anarchist, and communist groups, mainly in industrialized areas. Following the example of the Paris Commune and the 1892 Chicago workers' movement for the eight-hour working day, these groups had as immediate political goals the unification of Greek workers into trade unions, the implementation of an eight-hour day in Greece and better salaries for workers. Inspired by the Paris Commune and the communist revolutionary efforts in the United States, the German Empire, and Imperial Russia at the beginning of the century and the destruction that almost 20 years of wars had brought upon the Greek workers, a unified social-communist party was founded in Greece.

At the Second Congress of the SEKE in April 1920, the party decided to affiliate with the Comintern, an international communist organization founded in Moscow in 1919. It changed its name to the Socialist Workers' Party of Greece (Communist) (SEKE(K)). A new Central Committee was elected, which included Nikos and Panaghis Dimitratos, Yanis Kordatos, G. Doumas, and M. Sideris. At the Third Extraordinary Congress of the SEKE(K) in November 1924, the party was renamed the Communist Party of Greece and adopted the principles of Marxism–Leninism. Pandelis Pouliopoulos was elected as general-secretary. Ever since, the party has functioned on the basis of democratic centralism.

=== KKE between the two World Wars ===
KKE strongly opposed the military and political involvement of the Kingdom of Greece in the Greco-Turkish War of 1919–1922, which it considered an imperialistic scheme to control the market of Asia Minor given the new political situation after the defeat and collapse of the Ottoman Empire. KKE members propagated this position both on the front—which provoked accusations of treason from the Greek government—as well as in the mainland. KKE collaborated with the Soviet ambassador to persuade Venizelos’ administration to withdraw its troops from Asia Minor and to persuade the Soviet Union to exert political pressure on Mustafa Kemal Atatürk to allow autonomy for Greek cities in Asia Minor.

KKE played a prominent role in strikes, anti-war demonstrations, foundation of trade unions and worker associations. KKE and other leftist political forces fostered the creation of labor unions in all sectors, including the General Greek Workers Confederation (ΓΣΕΕ), which shared common goals with KKE.

These activities were met with opposition by the Mid-War governments. In 1929, as minister of Education in the government of Eleftherios Venizelos, Georgios Papandreou passed legislation against organised communist teachers, known as Idionymon. Such legislation was often used to prosecute KKE members and other leftist activists. Under the Idionymon all members of the Communist Party of Greece, being considered dangers to the state, were to be removed from public service or put in exile.

The first prison camps for left-wing citizens and communists were founded in that era. KKE and its organisations, although small in numbers, continue operating in all Greek major cities, especially industrial areas such as Athens, Piraeus, Patra, Thessaly and Volos, Thessaloniki, Kavala, and elsewhere.

The KKE collaborated with other newly founded Communist Parties to oppose the rise of the Fascist movements in Europe. In 1934, the Comintern decreed that anti-fascist fronts be formed internationally. KKE responded by creating the People's Front, which was the largest Marxist anti-fascist organisation in Greece prior to the dictatorship of Ioannis Metaxas. The party was banned in 1936 by the dictatorial regime of Metaxas and brutally persecuted by his security chief, Konstantinos Maniadakis. Many KKE members were imprisoned or exiled on isolated Aegean Islands.

KKE members volunteered to fight on the side of the republican government of Spain during the Spanish Civil War of 1936–1939. About 440 Greeks joined the ranks of the International Brigades, especially brigades such as the XV International Brigade and the Dimitrov Battalion, many of whom were high-ranking KKE members.

==== The KKE and the Macedonian question ====
After the Balkan Wars, World War I and the Greco-Turkish War, there were diplomatic approaches from the superpowers of that era regarding the re-drawing of Greek borders, based on the territorial claims of the Kingdom of Bulgaria and diplomatic relations between Turkey and the United States pressing for more territory to improve trade routes with the British Empire. The ruling parties were simultaneously trying to move parts of Northern Greece (Macedonia and Thrace) to Bulgaria and Turkey; and to win the return of islands in the Aegean and parts of Macedonian territory to the Kingdom of Yugoslavia. This policy was repeated several times throughout the pre-war era. The main impetus for their demand was the ethnic and religious minorities then living inside Greek borders in Northern Greece. The KKE opposed any geo-strategic game in the area which would use minorities to start a new imperialistic war in the region. At its Third Party Congress in 1924, KKE announced its policy for the self-determination of minorities, pointing out the minorities in Macedonia. Its policy was dictated Marxist–Leninist theory, that stated that any minorities should be self-determined under a common socialist state and it had its roots in the example of the newly founded Soviet Union. In 1924, the KKE expressed the official position of the Third International for "independent Macedonia and Thrace". Some members disagreed with this, but it remained the official position of the party and caused expulsions of communists by the Greek state. KKE was seen by many as a party whose policy was "the detachment of large areas of northern Greece". According to Richard Clogg, "this was dictated by Comintern and hurt the popularity of Communism at the time".

In 1934, the KKE changed its view and expressed its intent to "fight for the national self-determination, under a People's Republic where all nations will find their self-determination and will build the common state of the workers". Nikos Zachariadis, General Secretary of the Central Committee of the party, officially renounced KKE's policy of secession in 1945. Anti-KKE propaganda up to this day add on this quote the will to collaborate for this goal with the Bulgarian organizations of the Internal Macedonian Revolutionary Organization and the Thracian Revolutionary Organisation. This is not mentioned in any of the KKE's official documents. The quote is referenced as KKE's policy for "giving Greek soil to the northern enemies of the country", a fact that can not be crossed referenced with any of KKE referenced literature of that era.

During the civil war (1946–1949), an article written by Nikos Zachariadis expressed the KKE's strategy after the envisioned victory of the Democratic Army of Greece regarding what was then known as the "Macedonian Issue": "The Macedonian people will acquire an independent, united state with a coequal position within the family of free peoples' republics within the Balkans, within the family of Peoples' Republics to which the Greek people will belong. The Macedonian people are today fighting for this independent united state with a coequal position and is helping the DSE with all its soul". The policy of self-determination for Macedonia within a People's Republic was reiterated during the 5th KKE Central Committee meeting held in January 1949, which declared that the "Macedonian people participating in the liberation struggle would find their full national re-establishment as they want giving their blood for this acquisition [...] Macedonian Communists should pay great attentions to foreign chauvinist and counteractive elements that want to break the unity between the Greek and Macedonian people. This will only serve the monarcho-fascists and British imperialism".

In order for KKE to clear up its position on the "Macedonian issue", the 6th Congress of its Central Committee was called a few months later, during which it was clearly stated that KKE was fighting for a free Greece and for a common future for Greeks and Macedonian Slavs under the same state. The issue was ended by Central Committee in 1954 with the withdrawal of the position of self-determination of minorities. In 1988, the General Secretary of KKE, Charilaos Florakis, once again presented KKE's political position on the matter in a speech to the Greek Parliament. In 2019, KKE voted against the Prespa agreement, opposing the Accession of North Macedonia to NATO and the use of the term "Macedonian" for the language and ethnicity, suggesting instead "Slavomacedonian", while accepting North Macedonia as the name of the country.

=== The KKE during World War II ===
==== 1940 ====
By 1940, the KKE had almost collapsed after Metaxas' dictatorship had imprisoned many of its leadership and members. By October, half of the party's two thousand members were in prison or in exile. The Security Police proved successful in dismantling the party structure; not only had it imprisoned the leadership, but it created a fake series of Rizospastis, the Central Committee newspaper. This generated confusion among the remaining scattered underground members.

A small group of old party officials formed the "Old Central Committee" and two of them were elected by the 6th Conference. In his memoirs for the Greek Civil war, C. M. Woodhouse (the British liaison with Greek resistance groups during World War II) wrote: "The 'Old Central Committee' interpreted a directive issued by Comintern as indicating collaboration with the German and Italian dictatorships, given the Hitler-Stalin alliance". On the other hand, Woodhouse argues that Georgios Siantos, who had escaped from prison; and Nikos Zachariadis, who was still incarcerated, took the opposite view that KKE must support Metaxas in his fight against Mussolini. The archives of KKE also address the confusion between different KKE cadres as the "Old Committee" interpreted the politics of Nazi Germany and Fascist Italy as part of the "imperialistic game between the Axis forces and the British". This faction of KKE felt that the Metaxas regime was a "pawn of British imperialism in the region" and therefore the "Old Committee" viewed any war between the Axis forces and the British as an "imperialistic war that the people of any of the countries involved should not participate in". According to KKE's account, this position was criticised by Comintern in 1939 (a few months after the Molotov–Ribbentrop Pact), which had instructed KKE to fight against Italy in the event of an invasion of Greece.

Nikos Zachariadis, KKE General Secretary, wrote from prison on 2 November 1940: "Today the Greek people are waging a war of national liberation against Mussolini's fascism. In this war we must follow the Metaxas government and turn every city, every village and every house of Greece into a stronghold of the National Liberation Fight... On this war conducted by Metaxas government all of us should give all our forces without reservation. The working people's and the crowning achievement for today's fight should be and shall be a new Greece based on work, freedom, and liberated from any foreign imperialist dependence, with a truly pan-popular culture".

Several party members, including Nikos Ploumpidis of the "Old Central Committee", denounced this letter as a forgery produced by the Metaxas regime. Zachariadis was even accused of writing it to win the favour of Konstantinos Maniadakis, the Minister for Public Order, to win his release from prison. According to one source, when drafting this letter Zachariadis was unaware of the German–Soviet Non-aggression Pact and was castigated by the Comintern for an anti-Soviet stance.

According to KKE's archives, the "Old Central Committee" had been denounced for its stance on the war issue and today KKE claims that the majority of the party membership had not followed the decision of being neutral in case of an invasion. On 16 November 1940, Zachariadis repudiated the line of his first letter in a second letter where he accused the Greek Army of waging a "fascist" and "imperialistic war" and appealed to the Soviet Union for peaceful intervention, thus aligning his position with that of the "Old Central Committee".

On 7 December 1940, the "Old Central Committee" issued a manifesto addressed "to all the workers and public servants, to all soldiers, sailors and airmen, to patriot officers, to the mothers, fathers, wives and children of the fighters and the workers of all neighboring countries", in which it describes the war as a game of the imperialist powers, headed by the British. According to KKE, the "Old Central Committee" based this opinion on the belief that Mussolini's Italy would not dare to attack a country that had a cooperation agreement with the Soviet Union. The main political line of this manifesto was the call to the soldiers on the front not to go beyond Greek borders, but after securing them to try seek a peace agreement with the enemy.

Zachariadis may have issued a third letter on 17 January 1941, in which he explained the motives for his first letter and wrote: "Metaxas remains the principal enemy of the people and the country. His overthrowing is in the most immediate and vital interest of our people ... the peoples and soldiers of Greece and Italy are not enemies but brothers, and their solidarity will stop the war waged by capitalist exploiters".

According to KKE archives, Zachariadis had issued no further letters and the third letter may have been in fact the statement of the "Old Central Committee" on 18 March 1941. In any case, Zachariadis himself referred in his public statements after liberation almost exclusively to his first letter as proof of the patriotic character of KKE and its role as an inspiration to the Greek resistance movement during the war.

On 22 June 1941, the very same day that Hitler attacked the Soviet Union, KKE ordered its militants to organize "the struggle to defend the Soviet Union and the overthrow of the foreign fascist yoke".

==== 1941: German invasion and beginning of the Resistance ====
The German invasion of Greece

On 6 April 1941, the German invasion and occupation was launched and Athens was occupied on 27 April following an unconditional surrender of the Greek forces by General Georgios Tsolakoglou, who was later appointed Prime Minister by the Nazis. Confusion remained among many Greek Communists as to what the Moscow-sanctioned position was. In his memoirs, KKE leader Ioannis Ioannidis wrote about a regional communist cadre who proclaimed the following as Greece was being bombed by the Axis: "The Germans will not bomb us. The mustached-one [Stalin] will not let them". Ioannis Ioannidis was purged by Nikos Zachariadis, leader of the KKE in exile in 1953, and was stripped of his party offices. The article in the reference just cited ends with just the fact of his "Purge" and being "stripped of his Party offices", so it is unclear whether he was physically Purged (executed), as many Communists still were in 1953.

==== EAM-ELAS ====
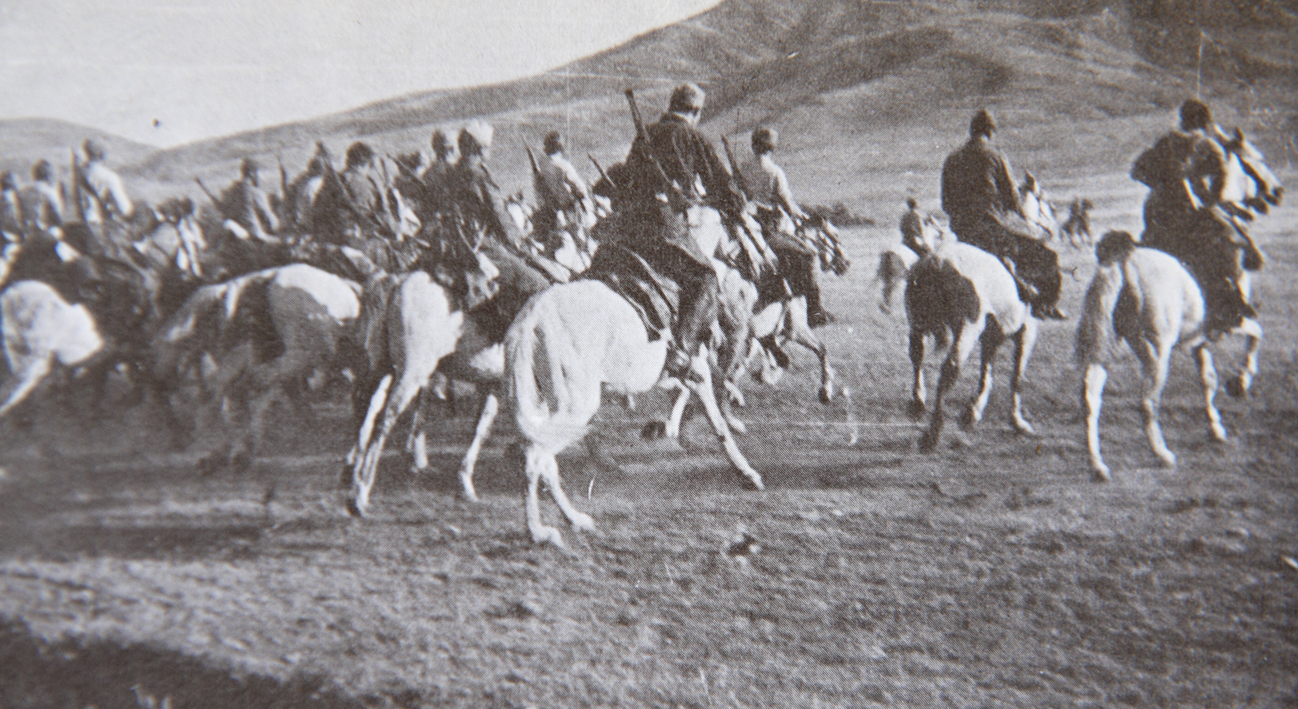
Cavalry of ELAS

A large number of KKE members were already in prison before the Nazi invasion. The pro-Nazi occupation government handed some of them over to the Nazis fearing that they—following the pro-Soviet party line—would resort to sabotage in Greece following Hitler's attack on the Soviet Union on 22 June 1941. There were many occasions that police officers released Communist prisoners, especially the ones who were in exile in Aegean islands. In 1941, several KKE members managed to escape prison. One of many stories includes the 20 communists held as political prisoners in Heraklion, Crete, who demanded to be released to fight against the invading Germans. The Greek government, which had left mainland Greece by then and was en route to Egypt, had no power to release them. They eventually escaped after their jail was damaged by German bombs and joined the British and Greek forces defending the Heraklion harbor. After the fall of Crete, many officers of the Greek Army joined forces with ELAS and became commanders in ELAS's corps of partisan units.

It became German policy—especially after it became obvious to them that they were losing the war—to execute civilians in retaliation for attacks against them by communist or non-communist partisans. Approximately 200 communists, delivered to the Germans on 1941, were executed at the Kaisariani Shooting Range on 1 May 1944.

Although the KKE was suffering from a lack of central political leadership since its leader Nikos Zachariadis had been taken by the Germans to the Dachau concentration camp, its members succeeded in maintaining communication with each other. The 6th Meeting of KKE Central Committee was held in Athens from 1–3 July 1941, which decided on strategy for an armed liberation struggle against the Axis invaders. At the same time, the "Old Central Committee" submitted to the authority of the new Central Committee. The first united resistance organization was founded in the regions of Macedonia and Thrace on 15 May 1941. In Thessaloniki, the Macedonian Bureau of KKE established the Eleftheri (Liberty) Organization, along with the Socialist Party, the Agrarian Party, the Democratic Union and Colonel Dimitrios Psarros (who later founded the EKKA).

The Macedonian Bureau of KKE organised the first two partisan units at the end of June 1941. The first was based in Kilkis and was named Athanasios Diakos, the second was based in Nigrita and was named Odysseas Androutsos. These small partisan units blew up bridges, attacked police stations and eventually organized into larger combat units of more than 300 men each. In several other places and in major cities, small armed groups of KKE members and non-communists began to emerge, protecting people from looters, the Germans, or collaborators. On 27 September 1941, Greek communists together with five other leftist parties formed the National Liberation Front (EAM) in Kallithea, Athens and began forming partisan militia units.

On 16 February 1942, the Greek People's Liberation Army (ELAS) was founded in a small kiosk in Phthiotis and by 1943 it consisted of 50,000 members, both men and women, with 30,000 as reserve units in major cities. The KKE played a prominent role in the organisation. By the end of the war, some 200,000 Greek citizens, both workers and peasants, had joined the ranks of KKE. KKE maintained its alliances with the EAM. Its main stated aim at this time was to form a united government with all parties that wanted to see Greece liberated from foreign powers.

ELAS conflicted finally with the rest of the resistance organizations and armies (especially EDES and EKKA), accusing most of them of being traitors and collaborators of the Nazis. These were the first conflicts of the coming civil war.

Nikos Zachariadis was imprisoned in Dachau; he was released in 1945 and returned to Greece as the elected general secretary of the KKE. During his imprisonment, Andreas Tsipas and Georgios Siantos served as party general secretaries.

=== DSE and the Greek Civil War ===
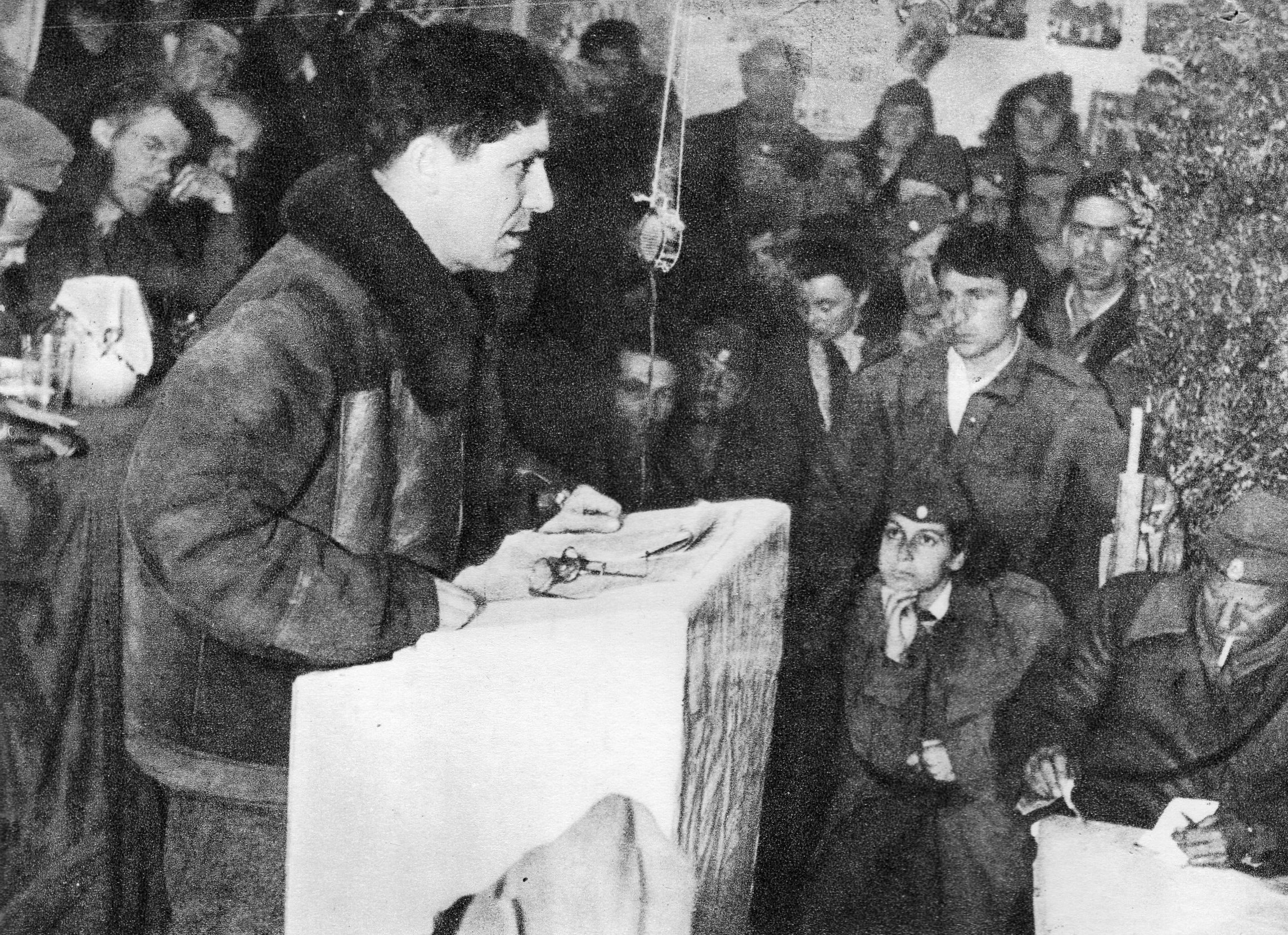
Nikos Zachariadis

After the liberation of Greece from German occupational forces, the government of National Unity, led by G. Papandreou, landed in Athens in October 1944. The government was formed after the Treaty of Cazerta and its main purpose was to form the new Greek state, try accused political and military personnel of collaboration with the Germans and to hold a referendum for the government and the constitution. After several weeks, it became obvious to the KKE and EAM that the returning Greek government and their British allies were hostile to the significant amount of control that they exerted in Greece. Papandreou demanded the disarmament of ELAS and the trials of the collaborators were stalled. Meanwhile, British-led Allied forces together with Greek troops were landing in all major Greek cities and EAM was welcoming them as liberators.

In mid-November 1944, the situation escalated dramatically; KKE criticised the interference of General Ronald Scobie in Greek affairs, and EAM refused to disarm ELAS and ELAN as demanded by Scobie. Six ministers of the EAM, resigned from their positions in the government of Georgios Papandreou in November 1944. Fighting broke out in Athens on 3 December 1944 during a demonstration organised by EAM and involving more than 100,000 people. During the demonstration, Greek gendarmes opened on the crowd. More than 28 demonstrators were killed and 148 injured. According to other accounts, it is uncertain if the first shots were fired by the gendarmes or the demonstrators. A member of the pro-monarchists Nikos Farmakis, in one of his interviews revealed that they had a direct order to fire at will when the demonstrators reach the court of the Palace. This incident was the beginning of the 37‑day Battle of Athens (Dekemvriana). Following a ceasefire agreement called the Treaty of Varkiza, ELAS laid down the majority of its weapons and dissolved all of its units. Right-wing groups, including elements which had collaborated with the Germans, seized this opportunity to persecute many KKE members.

According to EAM figures, in the few months after the Treaty of Varkiza the anticommunist violence on the Greek mainland had resulted in the imprisonment or exile of 100,000 ELAS partisans and EAM members, the deaths of 3,000 EAM officials and members, the rape of between 200 and 500 women, the burning of houses and other acts of violence. The KKE Central Committee issued a directive to all party forces not to engage in any armed conflict, but to try to prevent attacks by other means. This caused confusion among the majority of its supporters and served to weaken the party organisation across the country.

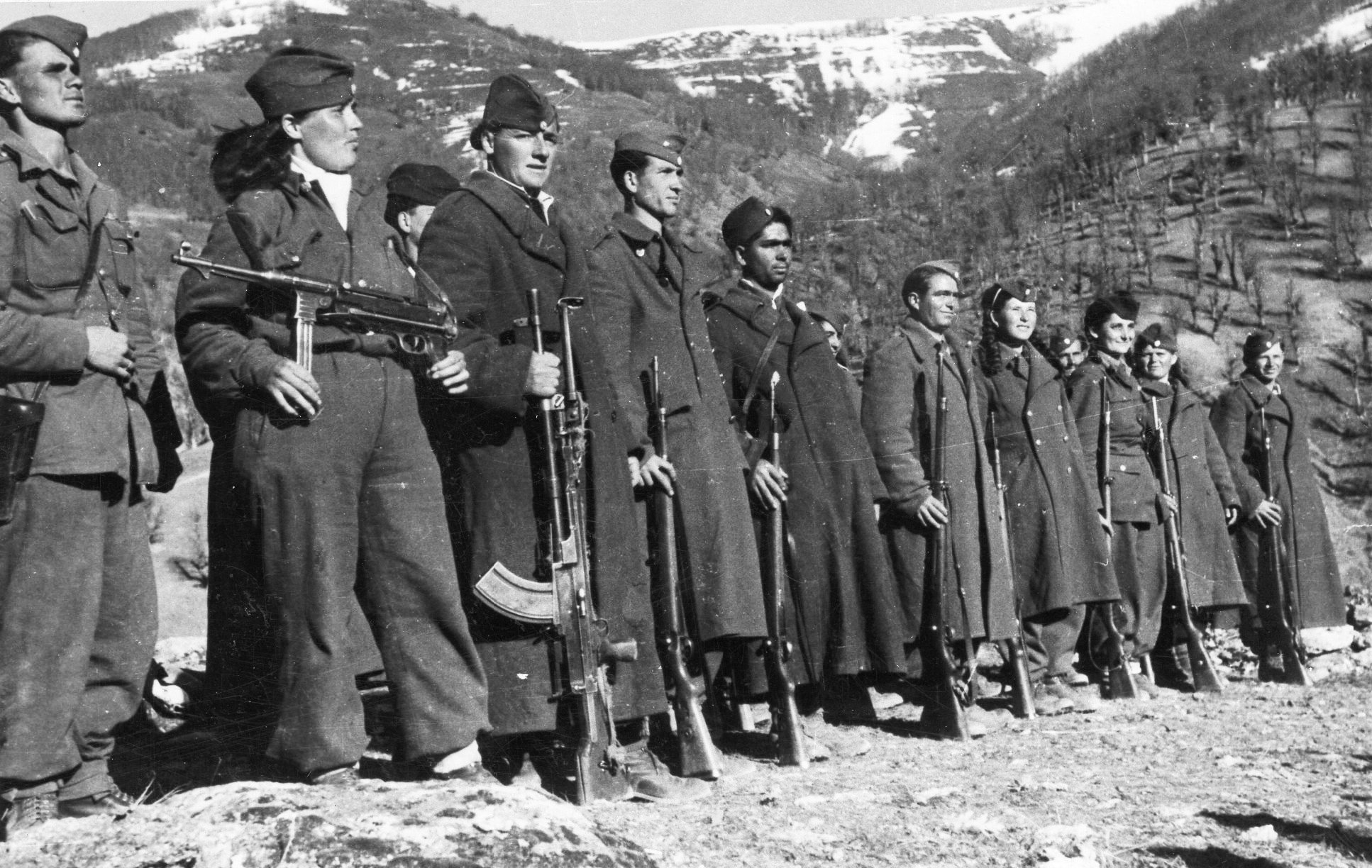
Fighters of DSE

Badge of the DSE in which the letter Delta stands for Demokratia, meaning both "Democracy" and "Republic" (in Greek language these words are one and the same)

Large groups had returned to their partisan hideouts in the mountains and gradually formed smaller partisan units. As most of the ELAS armoury had been surrendered under the terms of the Varkiza treaty, these units armed themselves with weapons seized from attacks on militia units that had been provided arms by the police as well as attacking police stations. By mid-1946, these units forced the KKE leadership to change its neutral position and to plan the formation of a partisan army with the officers and fighters that were still free. On 26 October 1946, KKE militia units attacked the police station in Litochoro, armed their forces and founded the Central Greece Command of the Democratic Army of Greece (DSE). After this successful operation, the remaining scattered groups reorganized the pre-Varkiza Treaty ELAS formations all over the country. KKE's political influence and organization structure helped form units in the Aegean Islands of as Mytilene, Chios, Icaria, Samos and Crete.

The Civil War involved two sides. On the one side was the British and American-backed Greek government, led by Konstantinos Tsaldaris and later Themistoklis Sofoulis, which was elected in the 1946 elections which the KKE had boycotted. On the other side was the Democratic Army of Greece, of which the KKE was the only major political force, backed by the NOF, Bulgaria, Yugoslavia and Albania.

In December 1947, the KKE and its allies that participated in the Civil War formed the Provisional Democratic Government ("Mountain Government") under the premiership of Markos Vafeiadis. After this, the KKE (still legal due to the Treaty of Varkiza) turned illegal.

On 29 January 1949, the Greek National Army appointed General Alexandros Papagos Commander-in-Chief. In August 1949, Papagos launched a major counter-offensive against DSE forces in northern Greece, code-named "Operation Torch". The plan was for the Greek National Army to gain control of the border with Albania in order to surround and defeat the DSE forces, numbering 8,500 fighters. The DSE suffered heavy losses from the operation, but managed to retreat its units to Albania.

Charilaos Florakis, whose nom de guerre was Kapetan Yiotis, was a DSE-appointed Brigadier General during this battle. Florakis was ordered by the DSE High Command to re-enter Greece with his battalion via the Gramos Mountains and try to establish connection with all the DSE forces that remained within Greece. The battalion indeed reached small DSE units south of Gramos down to Evritania and retreated thereafter back to Albania. Floriakis later served as General Secretary of KKE from 1972 to 1989.

On 28 August 1949, the Civil War in Greece ended with the DSE forces defeated militarily and politically and KKE entered a new phase in its history.

=== Post-war era ===
After the Civil War, the KKE was outlawed and most of its prominent members had to flee Greece, go underground or provide a signed declaration that they renounced communism to avoid prosecution as under Law 504, issued in 1948, a large number of KKE members were either prosecuted, jailed or exiled. Prominent members of the KKE were tried and executed, including Nikos Beloyannis in 1952 and Nikos Ploumpidis in 1954. The execution of Ploumpidis was the last such execution by the post-Civil War governments. The fear of widespread reaction from left-wing citizens curbed further executions and eventually led to the gradual release of most political prisoners. In 1955, there were 4,498 political prisoners and 898 exiles while in 1962 there were 1,359 prisoners and 296 exiles. However, under the prevailing anticommunist rules the communists and KKE sympathizers were barred from the public sector and lived under a repressive anticommunist surveillance system. Such discrimination against communists was partially relieved with the legalization of KKE in 1974 and the discrimination ended in the 1980s.

During this period of illegality, the KKE supported the United Democratic Left (EDA) Party. EDA functioned as the legal political expression of the outlawed KKE. It was not openly communist and attracted moderate voters reaching 70,000 members in the early 60s. Moreover, EDA had a very active youth wing. Historians have argued that the two parties operated parallel paths, something that contributed to the 1968 split between KKE and KKE Esoterikou.

Former king Constantine II claims that in 1964 he proposed to George Papandreou that the KKE be legalized. According to the former monarch, Papandreou refused to comply so as not to lose his party's left-wing supporters. This allegation cannot be verified as it was expressed after Papandreou's death. Moreover, Constantine's public statements regarding communism during the 1960s renders the veracity of this allegation questionable.

=== During the junta ===
On 21 April 1967, a group of right-wing Greek Army colonels led by Georgios Papadopoulos successfully carried out a coup d'état on the pretext of imminent "communist threat", establishing what became known as the Regime of the Colonels. All political parties, including EDA, were dissolved and civil liberties were suppressed for all Greek citizens. KKE members were persecuted along with other opponents of the junta.

In 1968, a crisis escalated between KKE's two main factions. The crisis was already festering during the 12th plenum of the party's central committee held in Budapest between 5 and 15 February 1968 in which three members of the politbureau (M. Partsalidis, Z. Zografos and P. Dimitriu) were expelled for fractionist activity and was further triggered by the Soviet invasion of Czechoslovakia. This event led a number of Greek communists who were ideologically leaning with the so-called opportunist faction to break with KKE that was loyal to the Socialist Republic's policy and to follow the nascent Eurocommunist line, which favored a more pluralistic approach to socialism. A relatively large group split from KKE, forming what became the Communist Party of Greece (Interior). The spin-off party forged bonds with Eurocommunist parties such as the Italian Communist Party as well as with Nicolae Ceaușescu's Romanian Communist Party. Its supporters referred to KKE as the KKE (Exterior) ("ΚΚΕ εξωτερικού"), inferring that KKE's policies were dictated by the Politburo of the Communist Party of the Soviet Union.

Despite the difficulties resulting from the split, KKE continued its opposition to the Greek Junta throughout the next six years. Its political fighting against the regime took the form of labour disruptions and strikes and small demonstrations all over the country. Its power was rising inside the Universities where the newly founded Communist Youth of Greece (KNE) began working underground. KKE underground forces continued to work closely with other political groups of the center and left within Greece and abroad. In many European capitals anti-Junta committees were founded to support the struggle in Greece.

=== Legalisation ===
After the restoration of parliamentary democracy in 1974, Konstantinos Karamanlis legalised the KKE hoping to reclaim "a vital part of national memory". In the 1974 elections, the KKE participated with the KKE Interior and the EDA under the name of the United Left, receiving 9.36 per cent of the vote. In the elections from 1977 to 1989, the KKE participated on its own.

In 1989, the political consequences of the Civil War were finally lifted. The war was named "Civil War" instead of "War against the gangs" ("συμμοριτοπόλεμος"), that was the official state name for that era up until that point and DSE fighters were named "DSE fighters" instead of "Communist Gangfighters" ("κουμουνιστοσυμμορίτες").

=== Participation in 1989 government ===
In 1944, following the Liberation of Greece, KKE participated in the national unity government of George Papandreou, holding the positions of Minister of Finance, Minister of Agriculture, Minister of Labor, Minister of National Economy and Public Works and Deputy Minister of Finance. KKE members retained their portfolios until December 2 (one day before the onset of the Dekemvriana).

In 1988, KKE and Greek Left (Greek EAP; the former KKE Interior), along with other left-wing parties and organisations, formed the Coalition of the Left and Progress (Synaspismos). In the June 1989 elections, Synaspismos gained 13.1 per cent of votes and joined a coalition with New Democracy to form a short-lived government amidst a political spectrum shaken by accusations of economic scandals against the previous administration of Andreas Papandreou's PASOK. In November of the same year, Synaspismos participated in the "Ecumenical government" with New Democracy and PASOK which appointed Xenophon Zolotas as prime minister for three months. In 1991, KKE withdrew from Synaspismos. Some KKE members left the party and remained in Synaspismos, which evolved into a separate left-wing party that is now Syriza.

=== 21st century ===
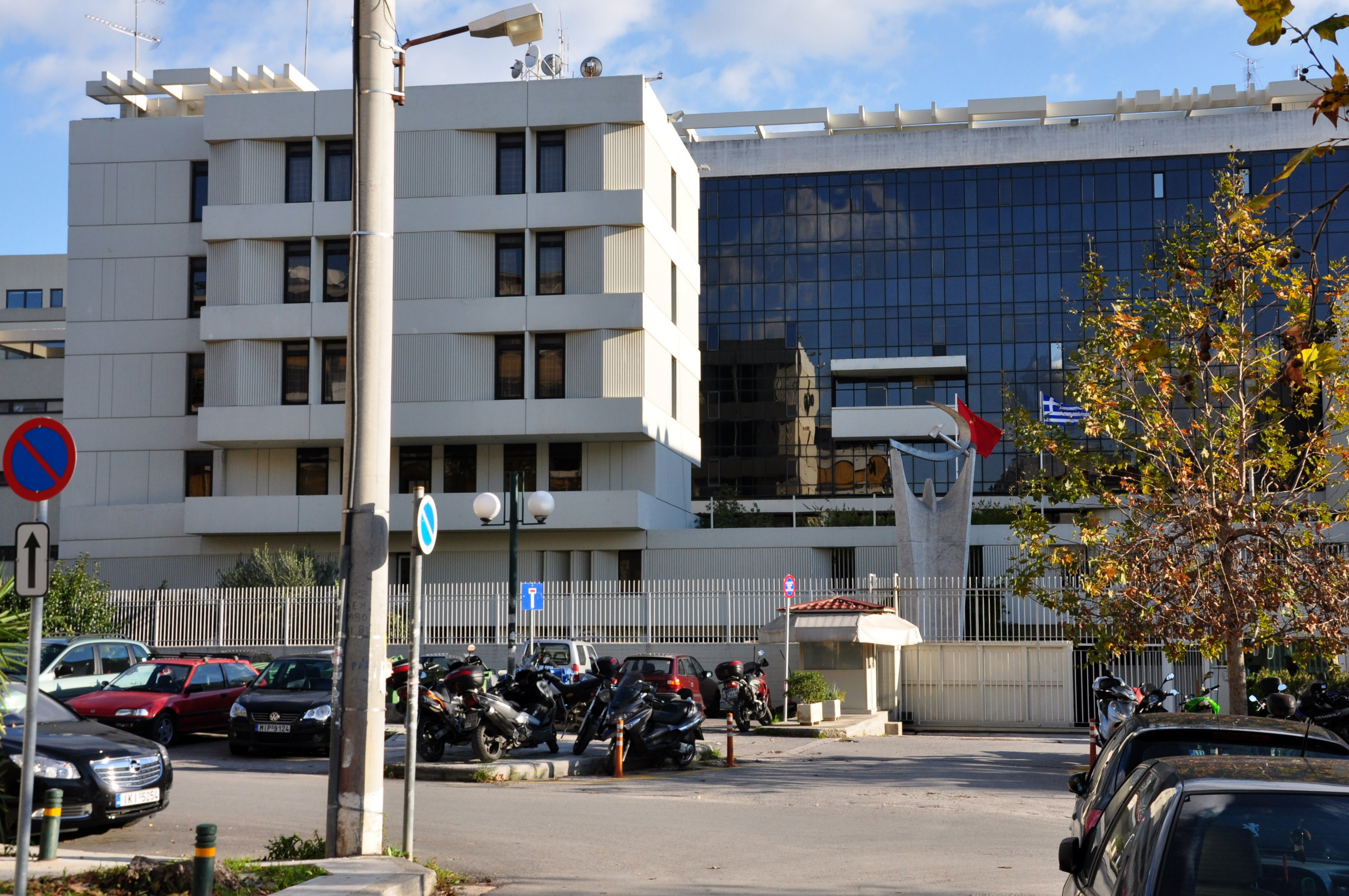
KKE central building in Athens

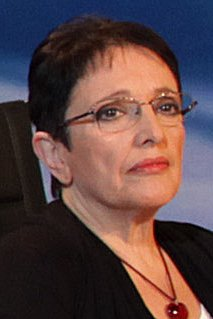
Aleka Papariga, the longest serving general secretary of KKE (1991–2013)

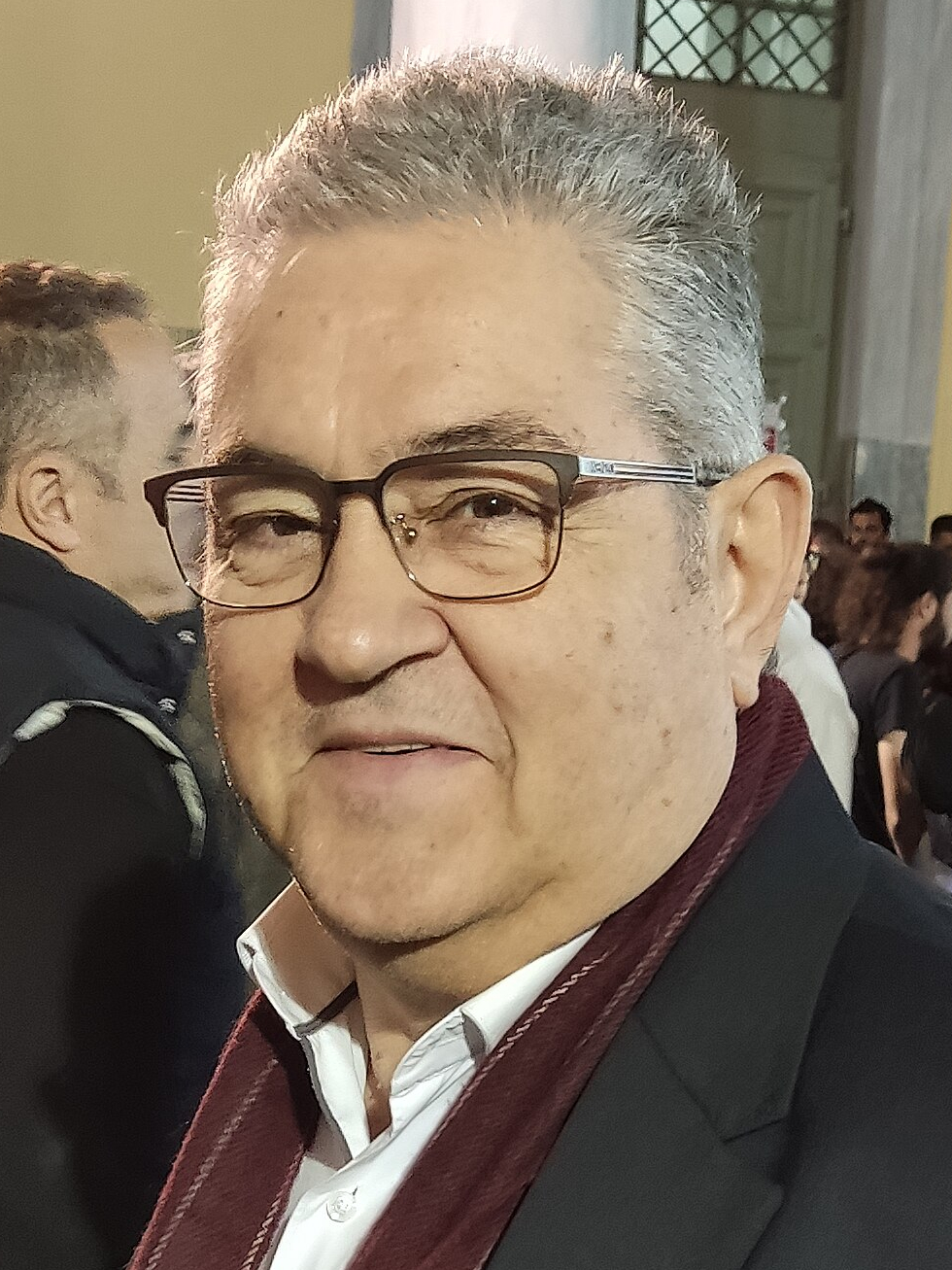
Dimitris Koutsoumpas, the incumbent general secretary of KKE since 2013

KKE actively participated in the anti-austerity protests beginning in 2010 and also supported Greek steel worker's strikes.

During the height of the Greek debt crisis in 2012, the party proposed disobedience to the Troika reforms, a "confrontation and a rupture with both NATO and the European Union, the unilateral cancelation of the debt and the development of the relations with States that produce mutual benefits". It criticized opposition party Syriza, accusing it of "presenting itself with a left speech" but operating in line with the capitalist system and "the European Union’s imperialism" and "anti-people strategy".

In the first 2012 legislative election held on 6 May, the party got 8.5% of the vote and increased its parliamentary seats by five for a total of 26 seats. However, in the second 2012 legislative election held a month later, on 17 June 2012, the party's support halved, resulting in a loss of 4 percentage points and 14 MPs.

On 3 June 2014, following the 2014 European elections, the Central Committee of the KKE announced that it would no longer continue the party's affiliation with the European United Left–Nordic Green Left (GUE/NGL) group in the European parliament.

After the failure of the Hellenic Parliament to elect a new President of State in late 2014, the parliament was dissolved and a snap legislative election was scheduled for 25 January 2015, where the party increased its support by one percentage point to 5.5%. At the fresh elections later that year, the party got a slight increase of 0.1 percentage points, reaching 5.6% of the vote. Since the 2015 election, the party saw a further increase in its support in opinion polls, overtaking the former major party PASOK to reach 4th place.

Although KKE was again overtaken by PASOK (which had been renamed Movement for Change – KINAL) in the 2019 election, it nonetheless managed to maintain a fourth-place in the polls, due to the decline of the far-right fascist party Golden Dawn.

In the 2023 Greek legislative election, KKE won in Icaria.

== Ideology ==
Ever since it was founded, the KKE's ideology and strategy have evolved while remaining rooted in Marxism-Leninism.

From the 15th Congress and until the 19th Congress, the KKE formulated and advocated for the "Antiimperialist Antimonopoly Democratic Front," (AADF) which, in its initial phase, "...starts like an coalition of mainly social forces around anti-imperialist and anti-monopoly demands and goals..."

In contrast, since the 19th Congress of the Party, the KKE has advocated for the "Popular Alliance," which has "an obvious anti-monopoly anti-capitalist orientation" and has the goal of the "...coalition of anti-monopoly anti-capitalist social forces with the goal of the struggle towards the worker's-people's power."

The abandonment of the AADF strategy has been criticised by opponents of the 19th Congress, who claim that its replacement by the "Popular Alliance" is responsible for the KKE's low percentages in the elections. Others however, have praised the new party programme and strategy.

=== Imperialist pyramid ===
The KKE has formulated and proposed the theory of the "Imperialist pyramid." According to it, there are different levels of power each country has in the international imperialist system.

The KKE believes that imperialism is "an entire historical era in the evolution of capitalism and is characteristic of capitalist societies, in all the capitalist countries, independent of the level of development of capitalism in them..." It also states that Greek capitalism occupies an "intermediate" position in the pyramid, while recognizing that it has "strong dependencies on the USA and the EU".

According to the KKE, the notion that some countries are "victims" rather than "perpetrators" of the imperialist system is opportunistic:

A number of opportunistic conceptions, while ostensibly accepting the characteristics of monopoly capitalism identified by Lenin, simultaneously exclude a large group of countries (even the majority of countries) from the division of markets. In doing so, they overlook the development of monopoly capitalism within these countries, arguing that they do not occupy the top of the pyramid (i.e. are not among the “top echelons”14) and therefore are not perpetrators but victims.

The confusion here concerning the very definition of imperialism is evident. Is imperialism the monopoly stage of capitalism, or is it simply synonymous with “imperialist policy”, understood as the ability of a bourgeois state, on the basis of its power (economic, political and military), to assert the interests of its own monopolies in the world market in a dominant manner? In the latter case, the concept of “imperialism” will invariably be confined to a core of states—one that may expand and change over time—occupying the top of the pyramid. Opportunist rhetoric that supposedly acknowledges imperialism as a new stage of capitalism, yet distinguishes between “imperialist” and non-imperialist countries within the “system” of imperialism (and, by extension, between aggressive and non-aggressive countries), cannot evade the question posed above without running into insurmountable contradictions.

We believe that the historical development of capitalism itself confirms the need to understand, first and foremost, the economic roots of the phenomenon of imperialism. Throughout this historical process, monopoly emerges in all capitalist countries, albeit at different rates: in some more rapidly, in others more slowly; in certain cases, through an arduous process of domestic accumulation, or through the initial dominant penetration of foreign monopolies. At the level of the world market—which, it should be noted, Marx identifies as already taking shape in the era of pre-monopoly capitalism, as early as 1848, in The Communist Manifesto—the development of internationalization has significantly broadened the multinational composition of the capital of monopoly groups.

It is self-evident that the differing levels of development of monopoly capitalism across countries confer varying degrees of power upon each country within the global imperialist system, in conjunction with its political and military strength. This, in turn, determines the varying capacities of individual states to intervene politically and advance the interests of their respective monopoly groups. The relative power of each country, shaped in part by the uneven development of capitalism, determines the extent to which it participates in the division of the spoils.

== Policies ==
=== Drug reform ===
KKE opposes decriminalization of drug consumption and drug trafficking. It opposes the division of drugs on more and less harmful, considering harm reduction legislation as "dominant bourgeois policy". It also opposes substitution rehabilitation programs (and endorses "cold turkey" programs) as it believes drug substitutes replace one addiction for another.

KKE positions on drug reform are summed up, among other texts, in an article on one of their websites:

(KKE).. is opposed both to the current repressive policy that imprisons users and frees traders and to the problem management policies as well as to the efforts to privatize the existing detoxification and prevention services. KKE believes in tackling the drug problem effectively. It supports the only realistic solution which is to strengthen the prevention – treatment – reintegration efforts. It says: No to ALL drugs. It denies the separation of soft – hard (drugs). It does not believe in substitution programs, which maintain drug addiction and do not cure it. The substitution should concern special groups (eg with chronic diseases). NO to the decriminalization of hashish. "Demand reduction" policy not "harm reduction" policy.

=== Economy ===
The KKE proposes the nationalization of the means of production and to centrally plan the economy. The latter, they argue, would enable the needs of the Greek people to be met. The party seeks the establishment of "popular power" and "popular economy", which would be characterized by social ownership of the means of production, central planning and workers' control. The short-term economic goals of the KKE are redistributive measures such as universal social security, labour protection rights and universal public education. At the same time, the party states that the limits of capitalism in redistributive measures, stressing that only a 'cohesive socialist programme' could provide adequate welfare to the workers.

According to the party, the free market is completely undesirable for the working class; while socialism is a long-term demand, short-term demands also include full employment, wage and pensions increases, the establishment of a 35-hour working week, provisions for the unemployed, establishment of agricultural cooperatives and a social wage system based on need rather than competitiveness. At the same time, the party takes an unequivocally anti-reformist stance, rejecting the possibility of governing within a capitalist system and advocating the establishment of a dictatorship of the proletariat, built through the central action of a revolutionary socialist state that proceeds to socialise the means of production under the leadership of the party. The KKE stresses that its political proposals depend, first and foremost, on the socialist revolution.

The party supports the economic policy of Joseph Stalin, praising the overall contribution of the USSR to socialism and arguing that history had vindicated Stalin's policies. The party argues that the USSR did not collapse because of structural flaws in its economy, but rather it fell because of the pressure from 'counter-revolutionary' forces inside the CPSU that forced deviations from Marxism-Leninism. The KKE criticises the Soviet economic policy of Nikita Khrushchev and his successors, arguing that it resulted in the "disempowerment of central planning" and was based on faulty application of socialist principles of economic management. Instead, the party postulated socializing the means of production under central planning and the centralized rule of the communist party.

The KKE connects class struggle with the defense of national sovereignty; it argues that the significance of nation-states did not wither away and instead became crucial, as the influence and sovereignty of the nation-states depends on the power of their national capital and their military power. The party states that the struggle of the proletariat must take place at the national level. At the same time, the KKE argues that the root of issues such as globalization and neoliberalism is capitalism. It states: "The people produce the wealth that belongs to them. But capital receives it. Here lies the root of the problem. Only socialism, with the workers’ taking power, with the social property of the main means of production, has the potential to provide solutions for humankind's great problems."

=== Foreign policy ===
The KKE takes a hard Eurosceptic stance. It advocates Greek patriotism alongside proletarian internationalism and considers it its patriotic duty to oppose Greece's EU membership. Furthermore, the KKE is absolutely opposed to Greece remaining in NATO. It argues that Greece is a dependent country, attacking the Greek ruling class for "putting foreign interests above national ones and surrendering national sovereignty by fostering the cosmopolitanism of capital, taking on the role of the flag bearer for NATO, the USA, the EU and playing the role of NATO’s salesman." The party argues that NATO serves the interests of "murderous states such as Israel and Saudi Arabia"; KKE demands the "closure of all foreign military bases in Greece [and] return of the Greek military forces involved in missions outside its borders."

The party considers the United States, the European Union, and Japan to be imperialist powers. The party is also critical of China, accusing it of "predominance of capitalist relations of production" and "assimilation into the imperialist system". It proposes a theory of an "imperialist pyramid", according to which the imperialist system has evolved to make even non-imperialist states interdependent on them, making all capitalist states a part of the imperialist pyramid. However, within the pyramid there exist contradictions and unequal relations which make it possible for the party to outline a 'hierarchy' of imperialism. It considers the United States to be the dominant imperialist power "at the top" of the pyramid, while countries such as China, Russia, Turkey and Greece are seen as "2nd- and 3rd-tier imperialists". The KKE also believes that the Chinese Communist Party has lost its revolutionary elements, although both parties still maintain bilateral relations with each other. The party does not take a position on Vietnam and Laos, countries that implemented reforms similar to those of China.

In 2022, the KKE condemned "the imperialist war in Ukraine" by issuing an appeal, which was also signed by communist parties in Spain (PCTE), Turkey (TKP), and Mexico (PCM). The KKE has condemned Russia's actions, stating that "the murders of civilians is the most atrocious and barbarous picture of the imperialistic wars from whenever it comes from wherever they take place, either now in Ukraine due to the Russian invasion or in the past in Yugoslavia, Iraq, Syria and elsewhere with the responsibility of USA and NATO."

The KKE is also critical of the Ukrainian government and boycotted Volodymyr Zelenskyy’s address to the Greek parliament, stating that he "represents a reactionary government backed by the US-NATO-EU camp and like Russia is responsible for the drama of the Ukrainian people" and that he has supported neo-Nazi groups and persecuted Ukrainian communists. The party stresses that it does not support Ukraine and that "inter-imperialist antagonisms constitute the basis for wars", that both sides are equally responsible for the war. It believes it is a war between the interests of the Euro-Atlanticists and Russia, using Ukraine as a battlefield at the expense of the Ukrainian and Russian peoples, "who had been living and fighting together for seventy years [in the framework of the USSR]". Thus, it is opposed to the Ukrainian government, which sides with NATO. Moreover, it has stated that "true solidarity with the people of Ukraine means struggling against any country's involvement in the war".

The position of the KKE has faced backlash from supporters of Ukraine and Russia alike; Greek political scientist Dimitri A. Sotiropoulos wrote that the KKE takes "a quiet, if not ambivalent, pro-Russian stance", while it has also been accused of "serving the interests of NATO" by condemning Russia, primarily by forces of the pro-Russia "World Anti-Imperialist Platform" (WAP). Many parties that participate in WAP, used to be in the European Communist Initiative (ECI) together with the KKE, which was dissolved because of the disagreements regarding the Russian invasion.

Along with the Portuguese Communist Party, the KKE has a perfect record on voting against resolutions that target Russia in the European Parliament. It also voted against the European Union–Ukraine Association Agreement, along with a few other Greek parties such as Independent Greeks and the Golden Dawn.

The party supported independent Cyprus, speaking for "a Cyprus united, independent, with one single sovereignty, one citizenship and international personality, without foreign bases and troops, without foreign guarantors and protectors." It rejects compromises like Annan plan between Greek-Cypriots and Turkish-Cypriots as "an imperialist plot".

The KKE supports Cuba, although in 2016 it criticized the Communist Party of Cuba for its adoption of the idea of national "models" of socialism that "revision fundamental principles of socialist construction" and attempts to justify policies of strengthening of the capitalist relations. The KKE also stated that those policies are "oriented towards capitalist restoration." Nevertheless, the KKE continues to show solidarity with Cuba, and in 2026 even organized a large solidarity rally. Furthermore, again in 2026, through the positions approved in the 22th Congress of the party, the KKE stated that it expresses its "deep internationalist solidarity to the Cuban people and the CP of Cuba, to all the peoples."

In October 2023, KKE officially supported Palestine and condemned Israel in the Gaza war. In 2026, through the positions of the 22th Congress, the KKE stated:

The KKE, over time, is on the side of the Palestinian people, condemns its occupation and genocide by the state-murderer of Israel, with the support of the USA, NATO and the EU. It's the party that stemming from its principles expressed its internationalist solidarity from the first day of the new escalation of the israeli barbarity and the genocide in the Gaza Strip with the pretext of the attack of Hamas in October of 2023 and called out decisively the attempt of slander of the Palestinian struggle, the attempt of the equation of the offender - victim that the government of ND and the other bourgeois parties made, that aligned with the positions of Israel and the war criminal Netanyahu, with the fabrications of the right of "self-defense" of the conqueror.

The KKE supports the two-state solution, however, it claims that the two-state solution the Palestinians are fighting for has nothing to do with the two-state solution the imperialists are advocating for. The party has also said that the Nakba is a "...continuous crime that is being committed with the constant support of the USA and EU..."

The KKE criticizes the American Communist Party, accusing it, amongst other things, of being an "apologist of today's capitalist Russia". The party is at the same time, critical of the CPUSA, criticizing it for following a policy of being a political "tail" behind the Democratic Party. The KKE has also criticized Sovintern, which it accuses of distorting Soviet history, as well as the World Anti-imperialist Platform.

In 2013, when Hugo Chavez died, the KKE's then General Secretary Aleka Papariga sent a message of solidarity to the people of Venezuela and said that the KKE expressed its condolences to the "family of Hugo Chavez, to the government, his party and the people of Venezuela."

=== LGBT rights ===
In December 2015, the KKE voted against the Civil Partnerships Bill proposed by Syriza that would extend cohabitation agreements to same-sex couples. It also voted against Civil partnerships for heterosexual couples. The KKE responded, among other things:

The family is a social relationship, it is an institution for the protection of children, as it was formed in the context of today's society, capitalism. We also believe that civil marriage should be the only, obligatory form of marriage. And whoever wants, let him have the right to the corresponding religious ceremony. But you do not touch upon this bourgeois modernization that has taken place in other countries for years.

If the government wanted to introduce a less "bureaucratic" civil marriage, it could propose the necessary amendments to the Civil Code. There is no need for two legal regulations (civil marriage and cohabitation agreement) on the rights and obligations between spouses, the core of which is the potential reproduction, upbringing and upbringing of children.

Today, this is confirmed by the fact that the Cohabitation Agreement is extended in terms of obligations and rights of both parties, which essentially resembles marriage and especially by the fact that it extends to same-sex couples. Greece's condemnation by the European Court of Justice, cited by the government and the Report, was not a breach of any positive obligation imposed by the European Convention on Human Rights. But it was a negative discrimination against homosexual scales, but in the context of the institutionalization of the Cohabitation Pact. If there was no Cohabitation Pact for heterosexual couples, there would be no question of condemning Greece.

The aim of the bill is essentially the institutional recognition of same-sex couples, including – in a process – the acquisition of children by them. And there, is our disagreement.

Rights and obligations arise within marriage, which is the legal expression of the social relations of the family. It includes social protection of children, who are biologically the result of sexual relations between a man and a woman.

With the formation of a socialist-communist society, a new type of partnership will undoubtedly be formed—a relatively stable heterosexual relationship and reproduction.

One of the party's MPs, Giannis Gkiokas, made a speech further explaining the party's opposition to the Co-habitation Agreement. Gkiokas argued that homosexuality is a personal choice rooted in "chronic social problems arising out of capitalist development", and that same-sex cohabitation agreement would open the way to child adoption by same-sex couples which would "damage children and the reproductive process". He also affirmed KKE's support for the nuclear, heterosexual family as a stable institution of reproduction and raising children that cannot be undermined. Many democratic socialist parties, including Syriza, denounced the KKE's stance as bigotry.

However, the KKE also supports strengthening legislation to punish homophobic behavior, and has spoken against such discrimination, with Dimitris Koutsoumpas, the KKE's General Secretary, stating that:

unacceptable and condemnable discrimination and violence against our fellow human beings, based on their sexual orientation and other personal characteristics, are not addressed by cheap declarations of equality and words of sympathy, but by strengthening legislation against perpetrators of sexism, racism, and homophobia, with the full social support of those who suffer from such behaviors. A real shield against such discrimination is collectivism, the struggle for modern social rights for all people.

Additionally, Koutsoumpas has claimed that the KKE is the only party that has insisted in parliament to strengthen legislation against homophobia. He also stated that there should be "an equality of rights."

In 2024, the party voted against legalising gay marriage and same-sex adoption, claiming that "same-sex marriage means abolishing paternity-maternity".

The party published an article by Makis Papadopoulos, a member of the KKE's Central Committee, in its newspaper Rizospastis and 902 TV media outlet. In the article, Papadopoulos denounces gender transition and puberty blockers, comparing them to experiments of Nazi criminal Josef Mengele. The article also addresses the LGBT movement, arguing that it is a part of the agenda of Western capitalist and imperialist institutions, as well as billionaires like George Soros:

The promotion of gender identity, the right to continuous gender transition, postmodern positions of "individual self-determination", and the lumping together of people with different class positions, political views, and expressions of sexuality into a single "LGBTQ community" are official strategies of the EU and NATO.

A series of legislative measures, such as the European Parental Certificate (which recognizes the parental relationship of a child with three parents of the same biological sex) have already been implemented. Mass entertainment platforms, such as Netflix, bombard viewers with identical messages, and portray anyone who rejects them as reactionary, religious, and fascist.

In this direction, the self-proclaimed leadership of LGBTQI is also being utilized, funded, and supported by groups such as George Soros, JP Morgan, and General Electric. At the recent World Economic Forum in Davos, participants discussed how corporate diplomacy will promote the LGBT agenda.

The KKE supports the legal right of transgender people to change their gender in their legal documents.

=== Other policies ===
The KKE takes a skeptical view towards movements such as feminism and environmentalism, and instead adheres to a "workerist and statist tradition". The party has been described as "conservative communist", as it is considered to be TAN on the GAL-TAN dimension (Green/Alternative/Libertarian vs Traditionalist/Authoritarian/Nationalist) used to measure stances on cultural issues. It is considered one of "the most conservative and least connected to post-materialist values" radical-left parties in Europe. It is considered culturally conservative, and socially conservative. Political scientist Federico Trastulli described KKE as "a markedly economically left-wing party and right-of-centre culturally". The party adopted distinctively socially conservative views in the early 2000s.

It has been described as Stalinist. Political scientist Luke March compared the party to the Communist Party of the Russian Federation (CPRF), writing: "The most appropriate parallel for the contemporary CPRF is now arguably the Greek Communist Party (KKE), known as being a 'paleaostalinist' party, with a strong tendency towards national-populism and sectarianism, particularly towards other left-wing parties."

The KKE denounces reformism and progressivism of other left-wing parties as a betrayal of the working class. The party instead "respects the religious feeling that has deep roots in much of the population, and people's devotion to the Greek language, tradition, habits, prejudices, and superstition", and argues that it "does not attempt to change these behaviors, nor to develop them on a higher theoretical or ideological level, but rather to turn them against what is foreign". It opposes the introduction of foreign universities in Greece, arguing that it amounts to an intellectual and cultural penetration of Greece and its society, injecting the cultural norms of foreign, dominant countries into Greece. Instead, KKE proposes to restore traditional teaching of Greek universities, criticizing reforms as profit- and business-oriented that "will only broaden the gap between Greek universities and renowned foreign institutions". Critics of the party consider this stance nationalist.

The party takes a very critical stance towards spontaneous social protests, arguing that they are not revolutionary in substance, and stand in contradiction with the actual interests of the workers. It highlights examples such as Greek industrial workers organizing counter-protests against environmental activists, given the prospects of losing their jobs. The party denounces movements for environmental causes, animal rights, and gender issues as "a form of opportunism that underplays the significance of class struggle" that is easily controlled by imperialist states and institutions. Political scientists Dan Keith and Giorgos Charalambous describe the KKE as traditionalist, authoritarian, and nationalist, writing that it is a communist party that is "completely untouched by any kind of liberal, red-green, or other leftist thinking".

In 2021, the KKE demanded the expansion of the "filoxenia" (hospitality) plan for refugees and immigrants that the New Democracy government had cancelled, resulting in the expulsion of refugees and immigrants from hotels, that the KKE demanded to stop. Also in 2021, the KKE, through its MEPs, demanded accessibility in the "educational process" for the children of refugees. Some of the party's stances on immigration have been described as nationalist.

It supports the separation of church and state. The KKE states that it respects religion and its connection to Greek culture and nation, and does not seek to challenge it.

== Splits and alliances ==
In 1956, after the 20th Congress of the Communist Party of the Soviet Union at which Nikita Khrushchev denounced the excesses of Joseph Stalin, a faction created the Group of Marxist–Leninists of Greece (OMLE), which split from the party in 1964, becoming the Organisation of Marxists-Leninists of Greece.

In 1968, amidst the Greek military junta of 1967–1974 and the Soviet invasion of Czechoslovakia, a relatively big group split from KKE, forming KKE Interior, claiming to be directed from within Greece rather than from the Soviet Union.

In 1988, KKE and Greek Left (the former KKE Interior), along with other left parties and organisations, formed the Coalition of the Left and Progress.

Also in 1989, a majority of members and officials from Communist Youth of Greece (KNE), the KKE's youth wing, split to form the New Left Current (NAR), drawing mainly youth in major cities, especially in Thessaloniki. However, KNE managed to overcome the split of 1989–91, despite the losses in members and officials that resulted initially in a decline of its influence and presence in the country. Already from 1991 the KNE had begun to rebuild itself after the split. Today KNE's student wing, PKS, has won the student elections in Greece since 2022, while the member base of the organisation and its activities have been growing steadily over the years to become one of the most influential and significant youth organisations in Greece during the 2020s.

In the early 2000s, a small group of major party officials such as Mitsos Kostopoulos left the party and formed the Movement for the Unity of Action of the Left (KEDA), which in the 2007 legislative election participated in the Coalition of the Radical Left (Syriza), which was to win the 2015 national elections with a plurality.

== The Congresses of the Communist Party of Greece ==
- The First Panhellenic Socialist Congress (the founding congress of SEKE) – November 1918, Piraeus
- The 2nd congress – April 1920, Athens
- Extraordinary pre-election congress – September 1920, Athens
- Extraordinary congress – October 1922, Athens
- Extraordinary pre-election congress – September 1923, Athens
- The 3rd (extraordinary) congress – 26 November–3 December 1924, Athens
- The 3rd (ordinary) congress – March 1927, Athens
- The 4th congress – December 1928, Athens
- The 5th congress – March 1934, Athens
- The 6th congress – December 1935, Athens
- The 7th congress – October 1945, Athens
- The 8th congress – August 1961 (illegally)
- The 9th congress – December 1973 (illegally)
- The 10th congress – May 1978
- The 11th congress – December 1982, Athens
- The 12th congress – May 1987
- The 13th congress – 19–24 February 1991, Athens
- The 14th congress – 18–21 December 1991, Athens
- The 15th congress – 22–26 May 1996, Athens
- The 16th congress – 14–17 December 2000, Athens
- The 17th congress – 9–12 February 2005, Athens
- The 18th congress – 18–22 February 2009, Athens
- The 19th congress – 11–14 April 2013, Athens
- The 20th congress – 30 March – 2 April 2017, Athens
- The 21st congress – 24–27 June 2021, Athens
- The 22nd congress - 29–31 January 2026, Athens

KKE delegations participated in international conferences of Communist and working parties (1957, 1960, 1969, Moscow). KKE approved the documents accepted at the conferences.

== Organization ==
=== List of First Secretaries and General Secretaries ===
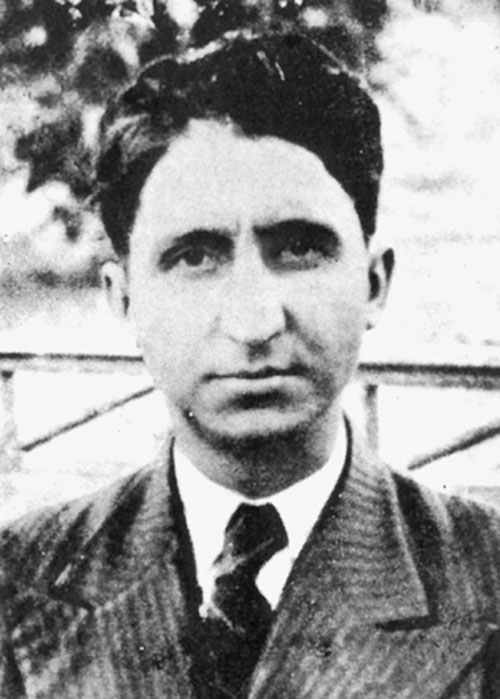
Pandelis Pouliopoulos, a supporter of the internationalist and revolutionary character of the communist movement

1. Nikolaos Dimitratos (November 1918 – February 1922), expelled from the party on charges of "suspect behavior"
2. Yanis Kordatos (February–November 1922)
3. Nikolaos Sargologos (November 1922 – September 1923), expelled from the party on charges of "espionage"
4. Thomas Apostolidis (September 1923 – December 1924), expelled from the party on charges of "opportunism"
5. Pandelis Pouliopoulos (December 1924 – September 1925)
6. Eleftherios Stavridis (1925–1926), expelled from the party on charges of pro-bourgeoisies political position
7. Pastias Giatsopoulos (September 1926 – March 1927), expelled from the party on charges of "liquidarism"
8. Andronikos Chaitas (March 1927 – 1931), expelled from the party and executed in the Soviet Union in 1938
9. Nikos Zachariadis (1931–1936), first term
10. Andreas Tsipas (July 1941 – September 1941)
11. Georgios Siantos (January 1942 – May 1945), caretaker until the return of Zachariadis
12. Nikos Zachariadis (May 1945 – March 1956), second term
13. Apostolos Grozos (March – June 1956)
14. Kostas Koligiannis (June 1956 – December 1972)
15. Charilaos Florakis (December 1972 – July 1989)
16. Grigoris Farakos (July 1989 – February 1991), resigned from the party to join Synaspismos
17. Aleka Papariga (February 1991 – April 2013)
18. Dimitris Koutsoumpas (April 2013 – present)

=== Party membership ===
Membership (1918–2008)
Year	Number of members
1918	1,000
1920	1,320
1924	2,200
1926	2,500
1928	2,000
1930	1,500
1933	4,416
1934	6,000 (est.)
1936 (start)	17,500
1936 (mid)	<10,000 (est.)
1941	200 (est.) free + 2,000 in prison
1942 (December)	15,000
1944 (June)	250,000
1944 (October)	420,000–450,000
1945 (October)	45,000
1946 (February)	<100,000
1948	<50,000
2008	<10,000

=== Youth organisation ===
The youth organization of the KKE is the Communist Youth of Greece (KNE), which is under the all-round guidance of the KKE. It was illegally founded in 1968 during the anti-communist military junta. KNE members and supporters are the most important political force in the Greek universities. Since 2022 the student wing of the KNE, Panspoudastiki, has won the student elections in the country.

=== Associated organizations ===
It publishes the daily newspaper Rizospastis. It also publishes the political and theoretical journal Communist Review (Greek: Κομμουνιστική Επιθεώρηση) every two months and a journal covering educational issues, Themata Paideias.

=== International affiliation ===
The KKE stands in elections and has representatives in the Hellenic Parliament, local authorities and the European Parliament, where its two MEPs sit with the Non-Inscrits.

KKE is currently trying to mold a loose and rather disorganised international communist movement along a purely Marxist–Leninist line. Since its 18th congress (February 2009), KKE has opened up a discussion within the ranks and more broadly within the Greek left-leaning community on the future evolution of communism in the 21st century, with a particular emphasis on examining the causes of the collapse of the Socialist system in the former Soviet Union and in Eastern Europe.

== Election results ==
Communist Party support in June 2023 election

=== Hellenic Parliament ===
Election	Hellenic Parliament					Rank	Government	Leader
Election	Votes	%	±pp	Seats won	+/−	Rank	Government	Leader
1928	14,352	1,56%	0	0 / 250	0	#12	No seats	Collective leadership
1932	58,233	4.97%	▲3.56	13 / 250	▲13	#6	Opposition	Νikos Zachariadis
1933	52,958	4.64%	▼0.33	0 / 248	▼13	#4	No seats	Νikos Zachariadis
1935	All People Front			0 / 300	0	#3	No seats	Νikos Zachariadis
1936	All People Front			15 / 300	▲15	#4	Opposition	Νikos Zachariadis
1974	With United Left			5 / 300	▲5	4th	Opposition	Charilaos Florakis
1977^{A}	480,272	9.4%	▼0.1	11 / 300	▲6	4th	Opposition	Charilaos Florakis
1981	620,302	10.9%	▲1.5	13 / 300	▲2	3rd	Opposition	Charilaos Florakis
1985	629,525	9.9%	▼1.0	12 / 300	▼1	3rd	Opposition	Charilaos Florakis
June 1989	With Synaspismos			20 / 300	▲8	3rd	Interim government ND–SYN	Charilaos Florakis
November 1989	With Synaspismos			16 / 300	▼4	3rd	National unity government ND–PASOK–SYN	Grigoris Farakos
1990	With Synaspismos			15 / 300	▼1	3rd	Opposition	Grigoris Farakos
1993^{B}	313,001	4.5%	▼5.7	9 / 300	▼6	4th	Opposition	Aleka Papariga
1996	380,046	5.6%	▲1.1	11 / 300	▲2	3rd	Opposition	Aleka Papariga
2000	379,454	5.5%	▼0.1	11 / 300	0	3rd	Opposition	Aleka Papariga
2004	436,818	5.9%	▲0.4	12 / 300	▲1	3rd	Opposition	Aleka Papariga
2007	583,750	8.2%	▲2.3	22 / 300	▲10	3rd	Opposition	Aleka Papariga
2009	517,154	7.5%	▼0.7	21 / 300	▼1	3rd	Opposition	Aleka Papariga
May 2012	536,105	8.5%	▲1.0	26 / 300	▲5	5th	Snap election	Aleka Papariga
Jun 2012	277,227	4.5%	▼4.0	12 / 300	▼14	7th	Opposition	Aleka Papariga
Jan 2015	338,138	5.5%	▲1.0	15 / 300	▲3	5th	Opposition	Dimitris Koutsoumpas
Sep 2015	301,632	5.6%	▲0.1	15 / 300	0	5th	Opposition	Dimitris Koutsoumpas
2019	299,592	5.3%	▼0.3	15 / 300	0	4th	Opposition	Dimitris Koutsoumpas
May 2023	426,741	7.2%	▲1.9	26 / 300	▲11	4th	Snap election	Dimitris Koutsoumpas
June 2023	401,187	7.7%	▲0.5	21 / 300	▼5	4th	Opposition	Dimitris Koutsoumpas

^{A} 1977 results compared to the United Left totals in the 1974 election.
^{B} 1993 results compared to the Synaspismos totals in the 1990 election.

=== European Parliament ===
European Parliament
Election	Votes	%	±pp	Seats won	+/−	Rank	Leader	EP Group
1981	729,052	12.84%	New	3 / 24	New	3rd	Charilaos Florakis	COM
1984	693,304	11.64%	▼1.20	3 / 24	0	3rd	Charilaos Florakis	COM
1989^{A}	936,175	14.31%	▲2.67	4 / 24	▲1	3rd	Charilaos Florakis	EUL
1994	410,741	6.29%	▼8.02	2 / 25	▼2	4th	Aleka Papariga	GUE/NGL
1999	557,365	8.67%	▲2.38	3 / 25	▲1	3rd	Aleka Papariga	GUE/NGL
2004	580,396	9.48%	▲0.81	3 / 24	0	3rd	Aleka Papariga	GUE/NGL
2009	428,151	8.35%	▼1.13	2 / 22	▼1	3rd	Aleka Papariga	GUE/NGL
2014	349,342	6.11%	▼2.24	2 / 21	0	6th	Dimitris Koutsoumpas	Non-attached
2019	302,677	5.35%	▼0.76	2 / 21	0	4th	Dimitris Koutsoumpas	Non-attached
2024	367,796	9.25%	▲3.90	2 / 21	0	5th	Dimitris Koutsoumpas	Non-attached

^{A} Contested as part of the Coalition of the Left and Progress.

== See also ==
- All-Workers Militant Front (PAME)
- International Meeting of Communist and Workers' Parties
- Initiative of Communist and Workers' Parties (defunct)
- European Communist Action
- Socialism in Greece
