= Aleka Papariga =

Greek politician (born 1945)

- Αλέκα Παπαρήγα
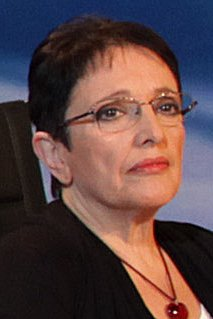
- Papariga in 2009

17th General Secretary of the Communist Party of Greece
- In office 27 February 1991 – 14 April 2013
- Preceded by: Grigoris Farakos
- Succeeded by: Dimitris Koutsoumpas

3rd Leader of the Communist Party Parliamentary Group
- In office 10 October 1993 – 25 January 2015
- Preceded by: Grigoris Farakos
- Succeeded by: Dimitris Koutsoumpas

Member of the Hellenic Parliament
- In office 10 October 1993 – 22 April 2023
- Constituency: Athens B

Personal details
- Born: 5 November 1945 (age 80) Athens, Greece
- Party: Communist Party of Greece
- Spouse: Thanasis Paparigas (died 2002)
- Children: 1
- Education: National and Kapodistrian University of Athens
- Occupation: Politician; Archaeologist; Historian; Teacher

Alexandra "Aleka" Papariga (née Drosou; Greek: Αλέκα Παπαρήγα; born 5 November 1945) is a Greek retired politician who served the Communist Party of Greece (KKE) as its General Secretary from 1991 to 2013. She is the first woman to be General Secretary of KKE, and thus the first woman to head a major political party in Greece.

== Early years ==
Alexandra Drosou (Αλεξάνδρα Δρόσου) was born in Athens in 1945. Her parents, Nikos Drosos and Kiki Drosou were National Resistance fighters and members of Communist Party of Greece (KKE), of Cephalonian origin.

She graduated from the Historical-Archeological Section of the Philosophy Faculty of Athens University and after graduation worked as an employee for eight years in various accounting offices. At the same time, she worked as a private tutor. Since 1976, she has worked exclusively in party and social activities.

== Political career ==
Papariga started out as an activist in the peace movement in 1961 and soon after joined the pupils' organization of the youth section of the United Democratic Left (EDA). She was active in various school and student movements until the military coup in 1967. Throughout this period, she was a member of the Bureau of the EDA youth section pupils' organization and then of the "Lambrakis" Democratic Youth Students’ organization Bureau.

=== Military junta ===
She joined KKE in 1968, while it was illegal during the Greek junta and was active in the prisoners' families' movement.

=== Third Hellenic Republic ===
After the restoration of democracy, she became a member of the Bureau of the City Committee of the Athens Party Organization (KOA), and was also active in the women's movement. A founding member of the Women's Federation of Greece, she participated in the organization of national events for International Women's Day. She was a leading member of the women's movement until 1981, and then active in the Athens Party Organization up to 1991. During her activities in the women's movement, she participated in international congresses of the Women's International Democratic Federation, the United Nations, and many international conferences and symposia.

Papariga has been a member of the Central Committee of KKE since the 10th Congress (May 1978) and of the Politburo of the CC since 1986. On 27 February 1991 at the 13th Party Congress, she was elected as Secretary-General of the KKE. She was unanimously re-elected as Secretary-General on 26 May 1996, at the 15th Party Congress. In February 2009, Papariga was re-elected as Secretary-General at the 18th Party Congress. This re-election made her the longest serving General Secretary of the KKE.

As a KKE candidate in Athens B constituency, Papariga was elected to the Hellenic Parliament in 1993 election. On 12 January 2023, it was announced that she would not be a parliamentary candidate and that she would retire from politics after the 2023 election.

== Personal life ==
She married the journalist Thanasis Paparigas, with whom she had a daughter, Vasileia, and another child who died at the age of three. Her husband died on 11 October 2002, after being seriously injured in a car accident.

Party political offices
Preceded by Grigoris Farakos	General Secretary of the Communist Party of Greece; 1991–2013	Succeeded by Dimitris Koutsoumpas
