= Rizospastis =

Greek Communist newspaper

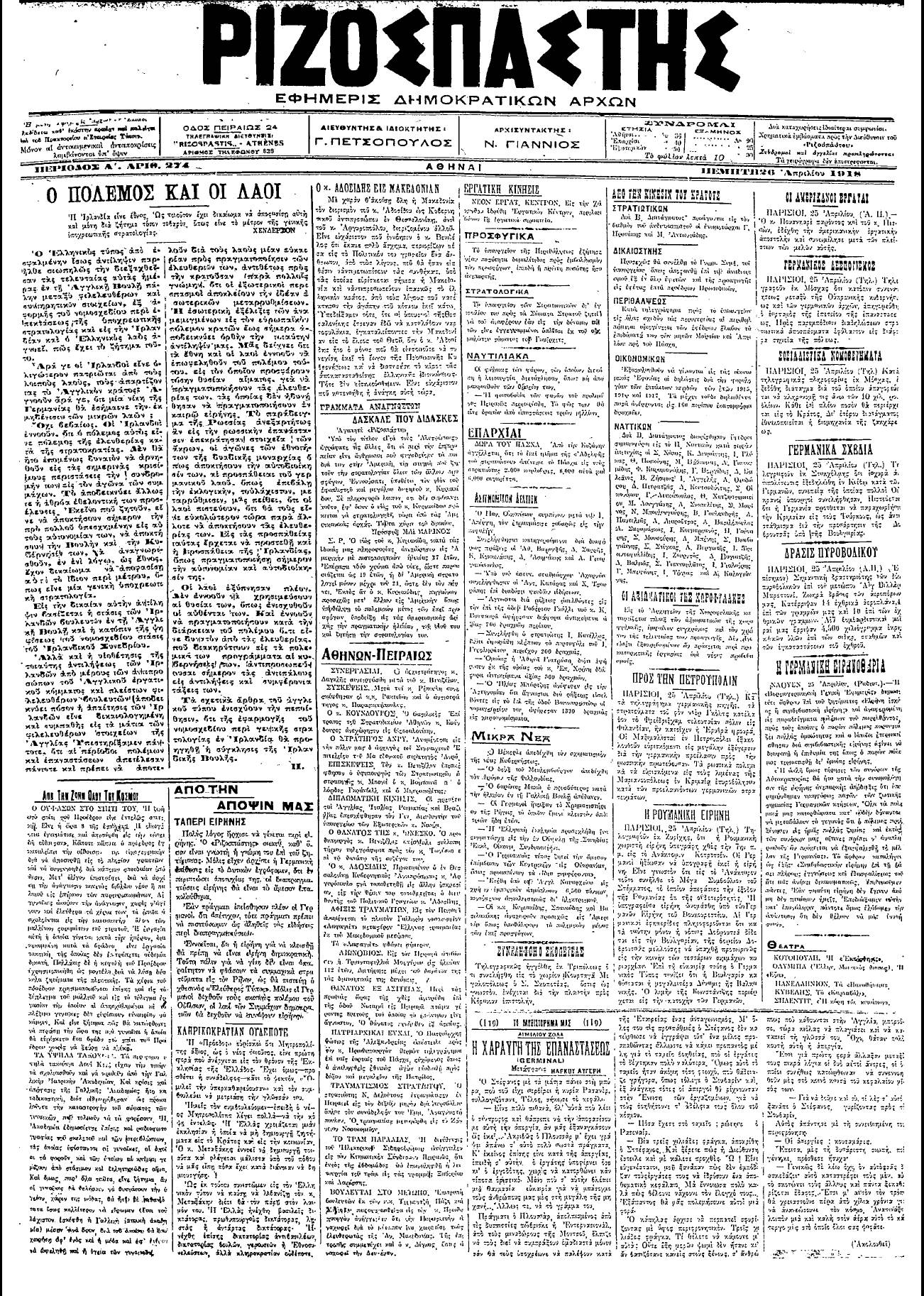
- Rizospastis, front page, 26 April 1918
- Type: Daily newspaper
- Owner: Communist Party of Greece
- Publisher: Communist Party of Greece
- Editor: Liana Kanelli
- Founded: 1916
- Political alignment: Communist; Marxist–Leninist
- Language: Greek
- City: Athens
- Country: Greece
- Website: rizospastis.gr

Rizospastis (Greek: Ριζοσπάστης, "The Radical") is a Greek daily newspaper based in Athens. It is the Organ of the Central Committee of the Communist Party of Greece. It has been published daily since its first issue in 1916. Liana Kanelli is currently one of the senior editors of the newspaper.

== See also ==
- Nikos Boyiopoulos
