= Labour festival =

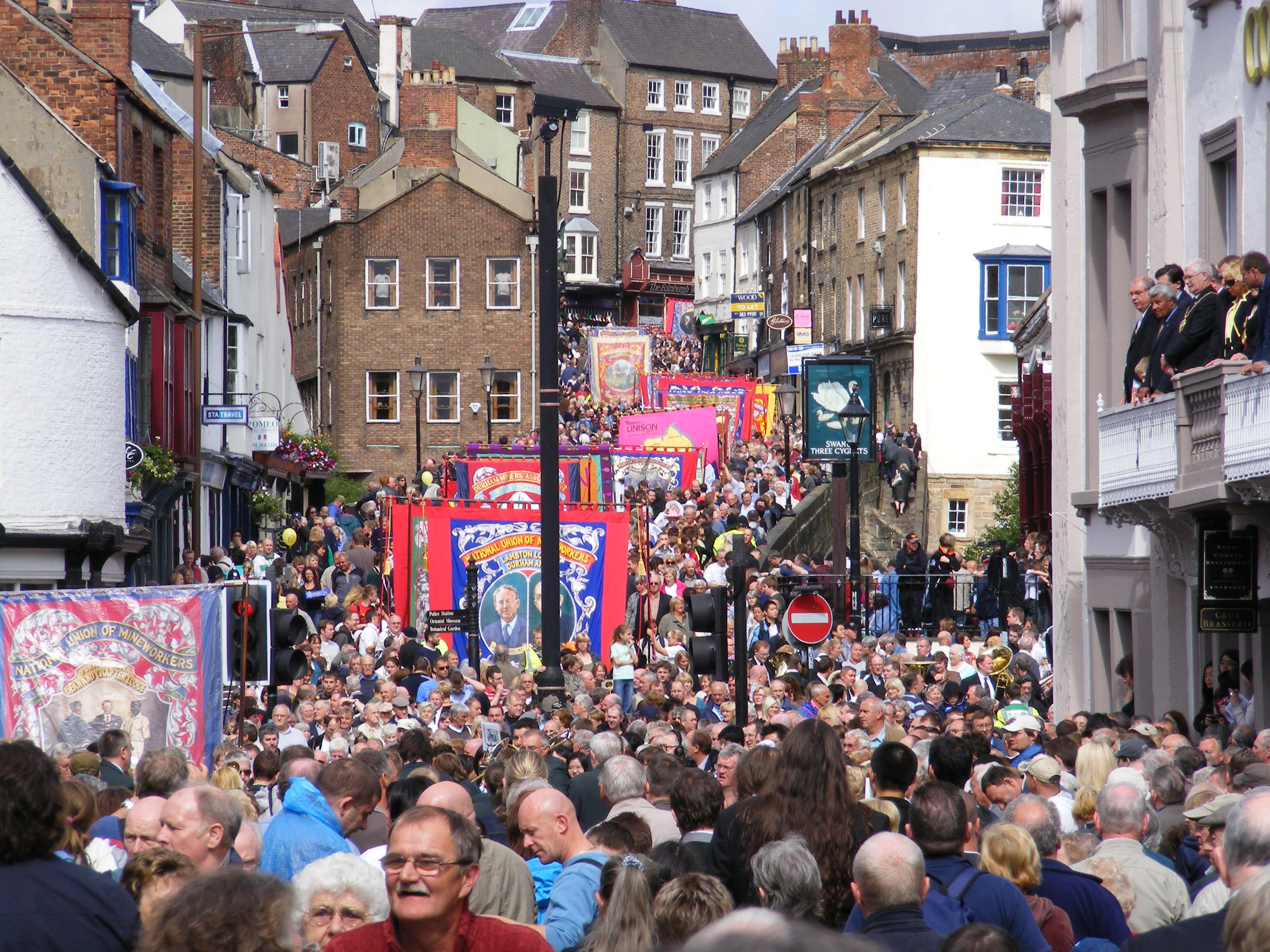
Durham Miners' Gala 2008

A labour festival (in the US, 'labor festival') is a festival related to the labour movement usually occurring annually. Labour festivals are some of the biggest political gatherings in Europe. Often they are outdoors in the summer and (more akin to a Fête) they incorporate music (particularly brass band), parades, film, historical commemoration and food and drink. One of the well-known ones is Durham Miners' Gala attended by some 100,000 attendees. Some are run by communist or socialist parties such as Fête de l'Humanité, Fête de Lutte Ouvrière, Avante! Festival, Odigitis festival and Festa Democratica. Some were formerly so, such as Edinburgh Labour People's Festival. Some commemorate trade unionism or history such as Burston Strike School and Tolpuddle Martyrs festival. Glastonbury Festival has a The Left Field and has been addressed by Labour leaders.

== Events ==
Festival	Country	Continent	Year established	Month	Attendance
Avante! Festival	Portugal	Europe	1976	September	
Durham Miners' Gala	United Kingdom	Europe	1871	July	100,000
Fête de l'Humanité	France	Europe	1930	September	100,000
Festa Democratica/Festa de l'Unità	Italy	Europe	2007		
Fête de Lutte Ouvrière	France	Europe	1981	May	25,000
LaborFest, San Francisco	United States	North America	1993	July	
ManiFiesta	Belgium	Europe	2010	September	19,000 (2016)
Odigitis Festival	Greece	Europe		September	
Tolpuddle Martyrs festival	United Kingdom	Europe	1922	July	10,000
UZ-Pressefest	Germany	Europe	1993	June	60,000
