= The Big Meeting =

2019 documentary film

The Big Meeting is a 2019 documentary film about the yearly Durham Miners' Gala by Liverpool-based film company Shut Out The Light. It was directed by Daniel Draper as a follow-up to 2017 documentary Dennis Skinner: Nature of the Beast. The film "shows the Gala through narratives that represent the past, present and future of the event".

== Synopsis ==
The film begins with a soaring introduction to County Durham, where we follow three rivers from the sea all the way to the Big Meeting itself. Following this, a short overview of the historical social changes in Europe in the mid-1800s, leading to the creation of many trade unions, including the Durham Miners' Association. This brief précis is important in establishing the history still felt at the Gala, and the passion which the film explores later on.

The main narrative of the film follows four protagonists over the course of the 2018 Gala – from early morning until evening. There is Charlotte Austin, a young University student who, impassioned about politics since the 'Jeremy Corbyn movement', works during the holidays at the radical and left-wing People's Bookshop in Durham. Charlotte represents the future of the movement and speaks passionately about the Gala renewing her spirit to carry on the fight for workers' rights. The newly formed (in 2018) Women's Banner Group is another of the protagonists in the film, and they are seen marching proudly with their community created banner. Their spokeswoman, Laura Daly, speaks about how although women attended the Gala, there was nothing there celebrating their contribution to mining life and culture, so this banner was created to help begin to rectify this. The Banner Group are seen becoming particularly overwhelmed when their banner is blessed at Durham Cathedral, a special sign of recognition. Stephen Guy leads the traditional Sherburn Banner Group, proudly marching a banner with his father on, and explaining the pride and history associated with a traditional miners' banner. The remaining protagonist is Heather Ward, a member of the Durham Miners Association Brass Band. We see the band from rehearsal, throughout the march through the city and on to the cathedral, where they get to perform yearly at the service. Heather explains the tradition of a band at the Gala, and the pride to be part of such an event.

Thought the film, vignettes of historical and cultural importance highlight other topics that branch off from the Gala. These include the Durham Bannermakers, who have been making banners since the 1980s. Emma Shankland explains how making the banners is more than just putting paint on canvas, it is a piece of art that isn't made to be hung on a wall. There is community pride associated with each banner, and they can be used as a tool for cultural education. A segment on mining art (filmed at Auckland Mining Art Gallery) shows some of the paintings depicting mining life above and below ground, that were nearly lost before Robert McManners, amongst others, realised their value. Another segment is on the first film made about the Gala – a short film called Gala Day from 1963, directed by John Irvin. With no narrative or voice-over, this observational documentary was part of the Free Cinema movement and was an inspiration for The Big Meeting. John Irvin himself describes his memories of the Gala and how his film came about.

An important segment, that feeds in to the Women's Banner Group storyline, is that of the role of women. During the 1984–1985 miners' strike women played an important role in keeping communities going, running food banks, organising rallies and community hospitals. As Ross Forbes of the DMA states, "the involvement of women is that which sustains. But not only the Gala, but all of the heritage and culture that we wish to maintain".

Although the Gala is a celebration of mining heritage, the film does not glorify mining. As director Daniel Draper stated in an interview with Film Hub North, "We made a conscious decision to show how mining was really an awful job – dangerous and exploitative – but that what those communities created was at times beautiful." Accompanying shots of miners cramped underground, Heather Wood states "I love mining because I think it made me who I am, but I hate it because of what it did to my Dad and my Grandad." Paul Mason comments how his Grandad "loved mining" but would be 'very glad' to learn that no-one has to go two miles underground in the dark and damp anymore.

MPs Dennis Skinner, Richard Burgon, Jeremy Corbyn, Angela Rayner, historian Robert Colls, author Selina Todd and activist Margaret Aspinall are among contributors explaining the importance of the political speeches on the show field, the significance of the County Hotel, the moving Cathedral service and more. This multi-faceted, historical event is explored in depth and explores the unity and solidarity on show each year at the Durham Miners' Gala.

== Production ==
Attending the 2016 Gala to film for Nature of the Beast, director Daniel Draper was "overcome by the noise, colour and culture on show." Then. following a sold out screening of Nature of the Beast at the Redhills: Durham Miners' Hall in December 2017, production company Shut Out The Light approached the DMA about making the first feature-length documentary about the Durham Miners' Gala. A production budget was quickly raised, and with the same team aboard as made Nature of the Beast (director/producer Daniel Draper, DoP Allan Melia, producer/editor Christie Allanson), filming began at the July 2018 Gala with fifteen cameras used to capture the day and covering multiple locations across the city of Durham, England. Access was granted to film from the main stage, the famous County Hotel and in Durham Cathedral. Additional filming and interviews were completed in the months following the Gala. The film's title is a reference to how locals refer to the Miners' Gala. Post production was completed in Liverpool early 2019.

== Release ==
The Big Meeting premiered at Redhills: Durham Miners' Hall on 22 June 2019 before going on general release in UK cinemas from 6 September 2019, with many screenings including Q&A sessions with the filmmakers and political figures. It was made available online and on DVD.

== Reception ==
Peter Bradshaw of The Guardian rated the film 4/5 and described the film as a "rich, heartfelt and intimate tribute to the Durham Miners' Gala". Chris Waywell of Time Out also rated the film 4/5 and stated it was "a fascinating insight into a culture still defined by coal mining". It also received four-star reviews from the Camden New Journal and VultureHound. David Parkinson of the Radio Times rated the film 3/5 and said it was "a compelling behind-the-scenes insight into the organisation of the march and the roles played in it by art, music, politics and working-class solidarity". The film also received 3/5 in Total Film.
