= Edinburgh People's Festival =

UK arts festival

The Edinburgh People's Festival is an arts festival and labour festival in Edinburgh, Scotland which is intended as a celebration of indigenous talent and cultural entertainment at venues across the city, especially in the outer schemes, at prices everyone can afford. It is inspired by the 1945 Labour Government which established the Edinburgh Festival to be a celebration of the arts 'for the people, by the people'.

The festival was re-established in 2002 by Colin Fox, who was later elected to parliament as a Lothian MSP, in reaction to high ticket prices at the Edinburgh Festival Fringe and the lack of events away from the city centre. It was initially organised by the Scottish Socialist Party, trade unions and local artists.

It carries on the tradition of the original Edinburgh People's Festival 1951–54 and acknowledges the cultural contribution made by Hamish Henderson, Ewan MacColl, Joan Littlewood, Norman Buchan and Joe Corrie.

== History ==
Since 2002 the People's Festival has presented shows in Saughton Prison, Edinburgh's Royal Infirmary, the Scottish Parliament, The Stand Comedy Club, Woodburn Miners Welfare, the BMC Club in Gorgie, Artspace in Craigmillar and the North Edinburgh Arts Centre as well as community centres in the North, South, East and West of the city.

The People's Festival's award-winning exhibition was constructed by the inmates of Saughton Prison, tells the story of the organisation from its origins in 1951 to the present day and was the centrepiece of last year's Radical Book Fair.

The 2009 August programme included the Hamish Henderson Memorial lecture, the launch of a book, What Robert Burns means to me to celebrate the poet's 250th anniversary, a walking tour of 'Radical Edinburgh', a concert Songs of the People, and a tour of Rebus's Edinburgh endorsed by Ian Rankin.
