= Boromo =

- Town
- Location within Burkina Faso, French West Africa
- Coordinates: 11°45′N 2°56′W
- Country: Burkina Faso
- Region: Boucle du Mouhoun Region
- Province: Balé
- Department: Boromo Department

Population (2019 census)
  - Total: 20,193
- Time zone: UTC+0 (GMT)
- ISO 3166 code: BFA

Boromo is a town in the Boromo Department of Balé Province in Burkina Faso. It is the capital of both the department and the province, and it has a population of 20,193 (2019).

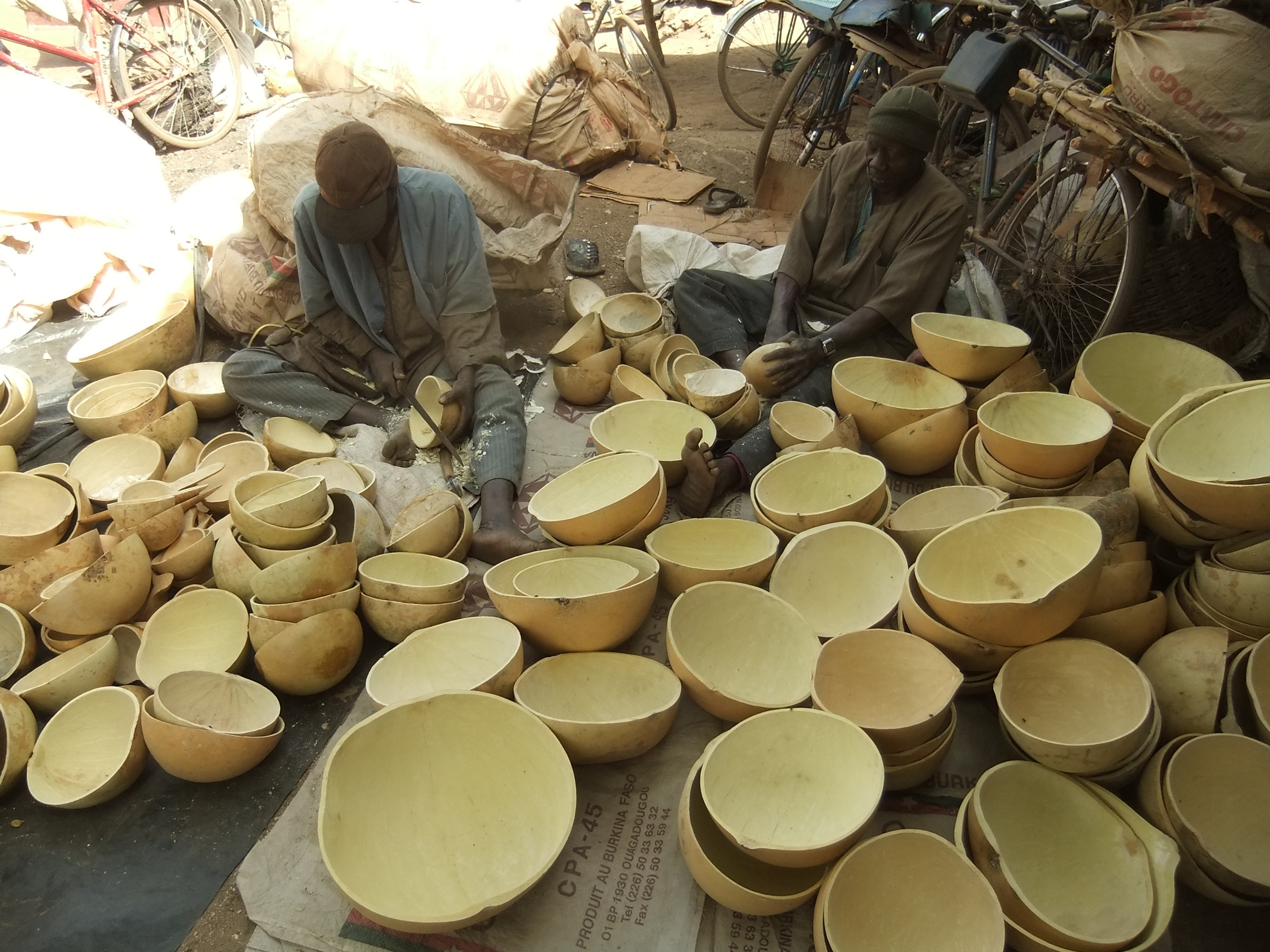
Calabash makers in Boromo

Boromo is located directly between the two major cities of Burkina Faso, Ouagadougou and Bobo-Dioulasso. It is a city with many natural resources, including gold and fish. The major activity in this zone is agriculture. Boromo is a "melting pot" where you will find many ethnic groups, including Mossi, Dioula, Dafing, Bobo and Winiens (or Kos).

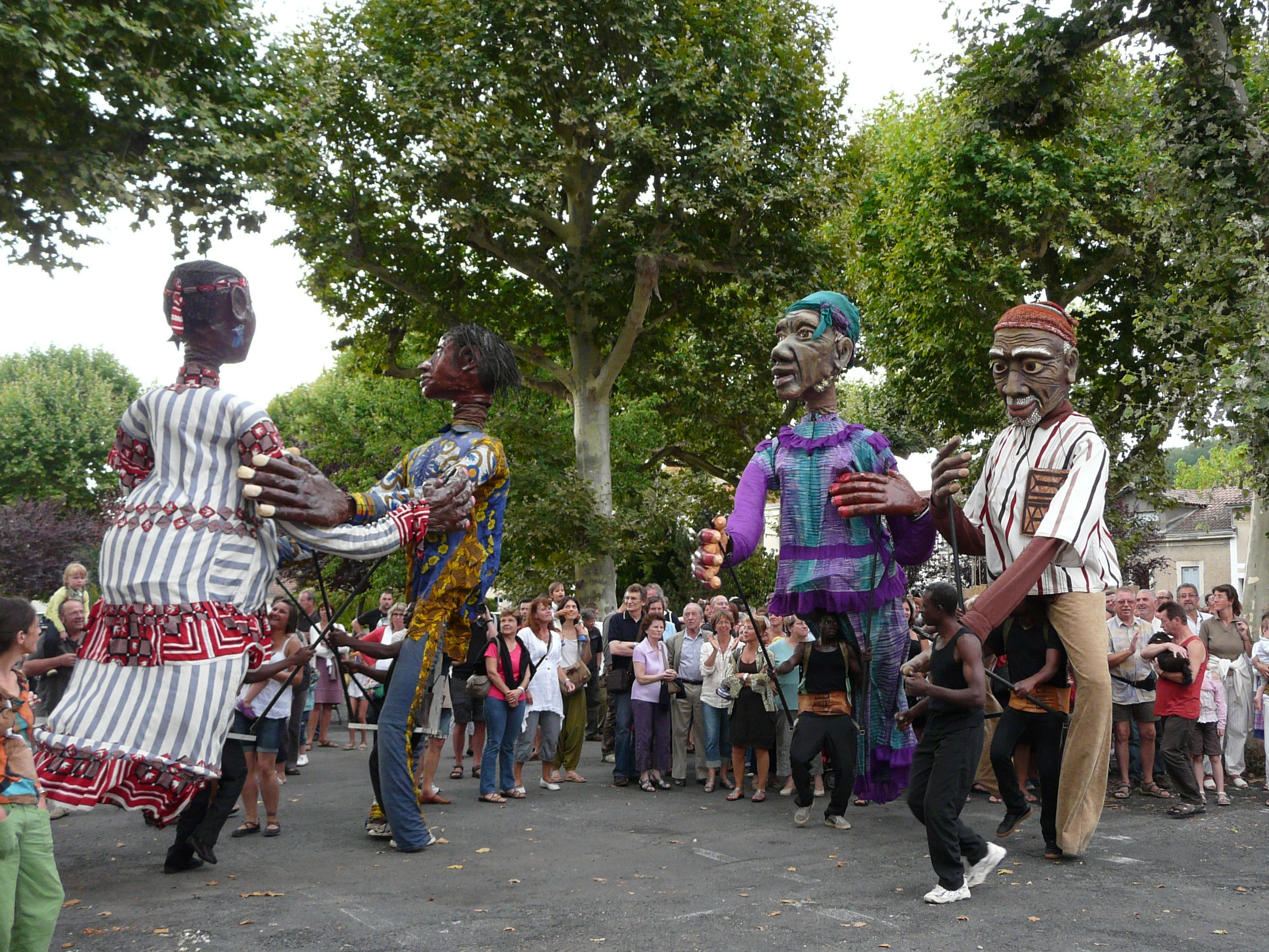
« Les Grandes Personnes of Boromo parading in Périgueux during the Mimos festival

Population
Year	Pop.	±%
1985	8,511	—
2006	14,594	+71.5%
2019	20,193	+38.4%

== Climate ==
Climate data for Boromo (1991–2020)
Month	Jan	Feb	Mar	Apr	May	Jun	Jul	Aug	Sep	Oct	Nov	Dec	Year
Record high °C (°F)	40.4 (104.7)	42.8 (109.0)	44.5 (112.1)	44.2 (111.6)	43.7 (110.7)	41.1 (106.0)	38.5 (101.3)	35.7 (96.3)	36.8 (98.2)	39.4 (102.9)	39.5 (103.1)	39.2 (102.6)	44.5 (112.1)
Mean daily maximum °C (°F)	34.1 (93.4)	37.0 (98.6)	39.6 (103.3)	39.7 (103.5)	37.9 (100.2)	35.0 (95.0)	32.3 (90.1)	31.1 (88.0)	32.3 (90.1)	35.4 (95.7)	36.8 (98.2)	34.9 (94.8)	35.5 (95.9)
Daily mean °C (°F)	25.6 (78.1)	28.6 (83.5)	31.7 (89.1)	32.6 (90.7)	31.3 (88.3)	29.2 (84.6)	27.2 (81.0)	26.3 (79.3)	26.9 (80.4)	28.5 (83.3)	28.0 (82.4)	26.0 (78.8)	28.5 (83.3)
Mean daily minimum °C (°F)	17.0 (62.6)	20.1 (68.2)	24.3 (75.7)	26.6 (79.9)	26.1 (79.0)	24.2 (75.6)	22.9 (73.2)	22.5 (72.5)	22.5 (72.5)	22.7 (72.9)	19.3 (66.7)	17.0 (62.6)	22.1 (71.8)
Record low °C (°F)	11.0 (51.8)	13.6 (56.5)	16.4 (61.5)	19.4 (66.9)	19.3 (66.7)	19.0 (66.2)	19.4 (66.9)	19.3 (66.7)	19.2 (66.6)	17.0 (62.6)	13.4 (56.1)	11.0 (51.8)	11.0 (51.8)
Average precipitation mm (inches)	0.8 (0.03)	1.0 (0.04)	5.3 (0.21)	42.6 (1.68)	79.7 (3.14)	118.9 (4.68)	200.4 (7.89)	261.2 (10.28)	157.8 (6.21)	52.9 (2.08)	1.5 (0.06)	0.0 (0.0)	922.1 (36.30)
Average precipitation days (≥ 1.0 mm)	0.1	0.2	1.0	3.1	6.4	8.3	12.5	15.0	12.0	4.9	0.3	0.0	63.8
Average relative humidity (%)	24	22	26	43	58	70	77	83	81	68	46	30	52
Mean monthly sunshine hours	268.4	244.0	248.2	232.7	242.9	222.8	209.7	194.0	222.3	267.5	277.0	271.7	2,901.2
Source 1: NOAA
Source 2: Deutscher Wetterdienst (humidity 1961–1967)

== See also ==
- 2008 Burkina Faso bus crash
- Railway stations in Burkina Faso
