= Communist Youth of Greece =

Youth organization of the Communist Party of Greece

Communist Youth of Greece Κομμουνιστική Νεολαία Ελλάδας
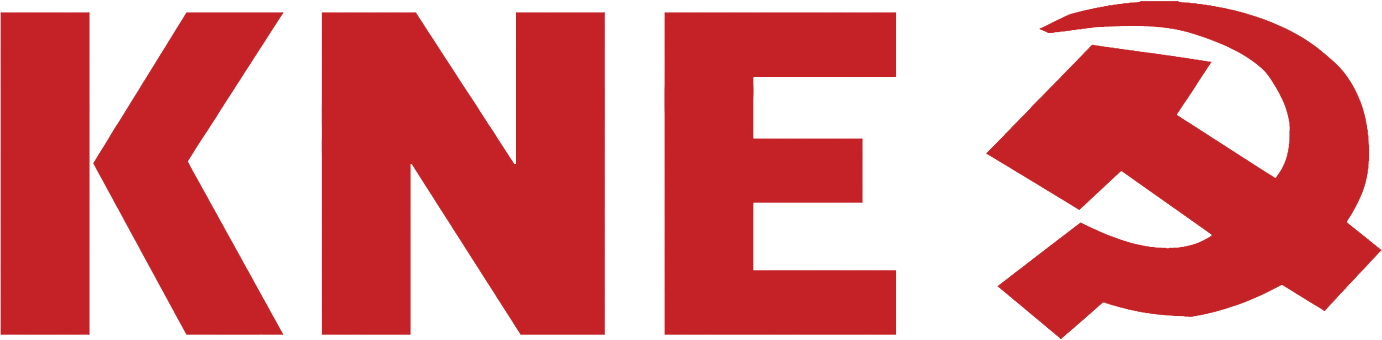
- Secretary General: Thodoris Kotsantis
- Founded: 15 September 1968; 58 years ago
- Preceded by: Young Communist League of Greece (OKNE)
- Headquarters: 145 Leof. Irakliou, 142 31 Athens (Nea Ionia), Greece
- Ideology: Communism; Marxism–Leninism
- Mother party: Communist Party of Greece (KKE)
- International affiliation: World Federation of Democratic Youth (WFDY); Meeting of European Communist Youth Organizations (MECYO)
- Magazine: Odigitis (Guider)
- Website: kne.gr

The Communist Youth of Greece (Greek: Κομμουνιστική Νεολαία Ελλάδας, romanized: Kommounistikí Neolaía Elládas; Greek: ΚΝΕ, KNE) is the youth organization of the Communist Party of Greece (KKE). It is a Marxist-Leninist organization which mainly seeks to familiarize the youth of Greece with the policies of the KKE.

It publishes the monthly magazine Odigitis (Greek: Οδηγητής, "guider") which operates as the Organ of the Central Council of KNE. The annual panhellenic festival of the organization gets its name from this magazine ("KNE-Odigitis Festival").

KNE is a member of the World Federation of Democratic Youth.

== History ==
KNE was founded on 15 September 1968, with a decision of the Political Bureau of the Central Committee of the KKE, during the Greek military junta of 1967–74, as an organization of youth with revolutionary and communist ideas.

It is the historical continuation of OKNE (Federation of Communist Youth Organizations of Greece), of all the organizations of youth which had already taken part in people's struggle in Greece, such as EPON (United Panhellenic Organization of Youth), DNE (Democratic Youth of Greece), D.N. "Lambrakis" (Democratic Youth "Lambrakis").

In 1989-1991, a deep crisis shocked KNE and the KKE. In autumn 1989, disagreeing with the participation of the KKE in the Tzannetakis and Zolotas national unity governments, a large group, including the major part of KNE under its secretary-general George Grapsas, split from the KKE and formed the New Left Current (NAR). The KKE, then part of the Synaspismos coalition, attempted to dissolve KNE into the Synaspismos Youth League. Later in 1991, the KKE left the coalition, purged all non-hardliners (incl. 45% of the central committee and KKE secretary-general Grigoris Farakos), and restored KNE with the efforts of some hundreds of members. In March 1993, the 6th Congress of the Organization took place.

In the late 2000s, KNE decided to constitute MAS (Front of Students' Struggle) (Greek: Μέτωπο Αγώνα Σπουδαστών, ΜΑΣ Metopo Agona Spoudaston) which was finally founded by students' organizations in Athens, 6 November 2009.

KNE has its own anthem, unlike the KKE itself which has no set or official anthem.

== The Congresses of KNE ==
- 1st Congress (19–22 February 1976)
- 2nd Congress (4–7 April 1979)
- 3rd Congress (14–18 December 1983)
- 4th Congress (1–5 June 1988)
- 5th Congress (25–27 January 1990)
- 6th Congress (19–21 March 1993) "The hope is in our struggle, with the KKE we open the road to the future"
- 7th Congress (1–4 May 1997) "Youth's counter-attack to imperialism, with the KKE for Socialism"
- 8th Congress (21–23 December 2001) "Youth dynamic in struggle with working class and the people, for the Front, for the Socialism"
- 9th Congress (12–14 May 2006) - Resolution
- 10th Congress (7–9 May 2010) - "Communism is the youth of the world, KNE our organization"
- 11th Congress (18–21 December 2014) - "Pioneer youth of the KKE - combatively en route for the socialist tomorrow - without crises, wars, exploitation"
- 12th Congress (15-17 February 2019) - "Even more, more capable, we pave the way for what is truly contemporary and young, for a world “worthy of our dreams, and worthy of our people”, Socialism!"
- 13th Congress (10-12 February 2023) - "We are the spark that will turn darkness into light!"

== List of Secretaries of the Central Council ==
The Secterary of the Central Council of KNE is the highest position in the organization, respective to the role of the General Secretary of the Central Committee in communist parties, such as the mother party of KNE.

1. Dimitris Tsiaras (1968-1972)
2. Dimitris Gontikas (1972-1979)
3. Spyros Chalvatzis (1979-1984)
4. Giorgos Grapsas (1984-1989)
5. Takis Theodorikakos (1989-1991)
6. Nikos Sofianos (1991-2000)
7. Themis Gionis (2000-2007)
8. Giannis Protoulis (2007-2011)
9. Thodoris Chionis (2011-2015)
10. Nikos Abatielos (2015-2023)
11. Thodoris Kotsantis (2023-today)

== KNE-Odigitis Festival ==
The Festival of the Communist Youth of Greece and Odigitis (Greek: Φεστιβάλ της Κομμουνιστικής Νεολαίας Ελλάδας και του Οδηγητή), known simply as KNE-Odigitis Festival (Greek: Φεστιβάλ ΚΝΕ-Οδηγητή), is a series of festivals organized in most of the major towns and cities of Greece. They have been taking place annually since 1975. The main festival has always been in Athens, where Tritsis Park has been the venue for the last decades.

== See also ==
- Young Communist League of Greece
