= Nature of the Beast =

Nature of the Beast may refer to:

== Film and television ==
- The Nature of the Beast (1919 film), a British silent drama film
- The Nature of the Beast (1995 film), an American mystery thriller film
- Nature of the Beast (2007 film), an American romantic comedy television film
- Dennis Skinner: Nature of the Beast, a 2017 British documentary film
- "Nature of the Beast" (Birds of Prey), an episode of the American series Birds of Prey
- "Nature of the Beast" (Burn Notice), an episode of the American spy drama Burn Notice
- "Nature of the Beast" (NCIS), an episode of the American police procedural drama NCIS

== Other uses ==
- The Nature of the Beast (album), a 1981 album by April Wine
- The Nature of the Beast (Impellitteri album), 2018
- "Nature of the Beast", a 1984 song by Spandau Ballet from the album Parade
- Nature of the Beast (album), a 1985 album by Maureen Steele
- "Nature of the Beast", a 2025 song by Testament from the album Para Bellum
- The Nature of the Beast, a 1945 book on animal behavior by Ruth Crosby Noble
