= EPON =

EPON may refer to:

- Ethernet passive optical network
- United Panhellenic Organization of Youth, a Greek leftist youth organization founded during World War II
- Epon, a type of epoxy resin used in sample preparation for electron microscopes
