= Dennis Skinner: Nature of the Beast =

2017 film

- Promotional poster
- Directed by: Daniel Draper
- Written by: Daniel Draper
- Produced by: Christie Allanson; Daniel Draper
- Starring: Dennis Skinner
- Cinematography: Allan Melia
- Edited by: Christie Allanson
- Music by: Patrick Dineen
- Production company: Shut Out The Light
- Release dates: 17 June 2017 (East End Film Festival); 8 September 2017 (United Kingdom)
- Running time: 96 minutes
- Country: United Kingdom
- Language: English
- Budget: £24,500

Dennis Skinner: Nature of the Beast is a 2017 British documentary film directed and written by Daniel Draper, and produced by Christie Allanson and Daniel Draper. The film is about the life, times and work of democratic socialist, trade unionist and Labour Party MP Dennis Skinner.

== Synopsis ==
Nature of the Beast roots Skinner in his elements: the confined chamber of the House of Commons, the great outdoors of the Derbyshire countryside, his love of nature and an obsession with London's parks where he walks every day between parliamentary sessions. It looks at what lies behind his passion and drive, and tracks his rise from miner and local councillor to becoming one of Britain's best known MPs.

The film uses a combination of archival and recent footage, along with interviews with Skinner, his family and his friends. It explores every aspect of Skinner's life. It follows Skinner from early years to modern day, his entry into politics, his high and low points, his rebellions against the party, while naturally highlighting the wit and passion that has earned him the nickname "The Beast of Bolsover". It documents how Skinner was brought up with his nine siblings within a mining village of Clay Cross, his early childhood memories and how he naturally became politicised by his surroundings. From working as a miner to his rise through the local council, to when he was elected as a member of parliament for Bolsover in the 1970 general election. Drawing reference from Skinner's love of nature and the chapter in his autobiography (Sailing Close to the Wind) titled "The Agony and The Ecstasy", the film draws upon the landscape to highlight the peaks and troughs of Skinner's political career. This includes Skinner seeing off the union-busting Industrial Relations Act 1971, the 1973 Clay Cross Housing Finance Act dispute, the Pentonville Five protests, the 1974 general elections, protesting against Margaret Thatcher during the 1984–1985 miner's strike and his filibustering of Enoch Powell's bill to ban stem cell research by moving a by-election writ. The film compares the ever-changing seasons of nature to the constant shifting of the political climate.

Skinner shares many anecdotes throughout the documentary. Woven into this narrative are more personal moments including Skinner's schoolboy cross-country days, his love of sports, musicals and cinema, and his passion for the outdoors, nature and singing, his love of Woody Allen films and a competitive speed walking, his relationship with his family, sharing his personal career highlights and stories about his Alzheimer's-afflicted late mother, discussions with his siblings and parents. Skinner boasts of having stuck to three self-imposed rules: not to pair with other parties, not to go in the bars in the House of Commons and not to go on all-party trips. He also refuses patronage.

Archive footage of Skinner speaking in parliament and on protests is interspersed with contemporary interviews with him and his brothers. As well as his famous quips, comments about Black Rod during the State Opening of Parliament, brief media appearances, speaking in parliament and on protests, the film also includes interviews with his four remaining brothers (Graham, David, Garry and Derrick) and some of his Bolsover constituents.

== Production ==
"Working with Dennis over the last three years has been an absolute joy – to have such access to a political stalwart, to witness his passion first hand and to capture his narrative on film has been an honour. He is the personification of what the Labour party should be, and his principles are particularly relevant in today's political climate. It's important that a portrait of this man exists, and I'm thrilled Dennis trusted me to do it."

—Daniel Draper, writer, director and producer of Nature of the Beast

Daniel Draper, a film graduate from Liverpool, became truly politicised after reading Robert Tressell's book The Ragged-Trousered Philanthropists. After interviewing Skinner for a short documentary about the book, Draper approached Skinner about making a feature-length documentary about his life and contribution to British politics.

Nature of the Beast draws its title from Skinner's nickname, "The Beast of Bolsover". The film is the debut film by Daniel Draper who made it over three years. With Skinner on board, a small team was assembled including Draper's producing partner and editor Christie Allanson, and director of photography Allan Melia.

In late 2014, photography began after a small grant was received from the National Union of Mineworkers and several trade union branches. Due to the small budget, all the crew volunteered their time and expertise over a period of 18-months, travelling a combined 3000 miles across the country and working around Skinners' busy schedule. The film was shot in various locations, including the House of Commons, Hyde Park, Richmond Park, Durham Miners' Gala, the National Union of Mineworkers headquarters, Clay Cross, Rhyl, Gainsborough, Ashton-under-Lyne and the Derbyshire countryside.

After photography was completed in summer 2016, in September 2016, a Kickstarter campaign was launched, to raise the remaining £18,000 needed to pay for the archive footage, images, and post-production sound to complete the film In October 2016, the makers of the film reached the £18,000 target through the crowdfunding campaign and the film was completed with £21,009 raised. It was produced by Shut Out The Light.

In September 2016, co-producer Christie Allanson told the Derbyshire Times, "Being independent and raising the money in this fashion does have its benefits, we were able to construct our narrative and tell Dennis's story in the way we wanted. This artistic freedom has enabled us to create a film with complete freedom, without worrying about mainstream concerns, which may have held our narrative back if we were backed by a corporation or broadcaster."

In June 2017, Director Daniel Draper said, "Working with Dennis over the last three years has been an absolute joy – to have such access to a political stalwart, to witness his passion first hand and to capture his narrative on film has been an honour. He is the personification of what the Labour party should be, and his principles are particularly relevant in today's political climate. It's important that a portrait of this man exists, and I'm thrilled Dennis trusted me to do it."

== Release ==
On 17 June 2017, Nature of the Beast was presented as part of the East End Film Festival, in partnership with the London Labour Film Festival. From 9 to 14 June, the film appeared on the Doc/Player platform at the Sheffield International Documentary Festival. On 12 July, the film was screened at the Galway Film Fleadh. On 14 July, the film was screened at the Tolpuddle Radical Film Festival. After the film's premiere at Derby QUAD on 8 September 2017, it was released in UK cinemas, and is now available on DVD.

== Reception ==

Tim Adams of The Observer described Nature of the Beast as a "a thoughtful, beautifully constructed portrait of a singular man" and the "film brilliantly captures that clannish emotional pull of Skinner's politics..." Rebecca Nicholson of The Guardian called it a "a gentle portrait of the Commons curmudgeon, which ends up being a timely reminder that principled politicians are not a myth." Peter Bradshaw of The Guardian rated it 4/5 and called it "affectionate and respectful". Simran Hans of The Observer rated the film 3/5 and called it "...effective enough, but Draper's tendency towards timelessness means his film lacks urgency." Matthew Turner of i rated it 3/5 and called it a "fascinating documentary that sheds an intriguing light on what one of Skinner's constituents refers to as "the whole man", the sides of his character the wider public don't get to see in his House of Commons appearances." Edward Porter of The Times rated the film 3/5 and called it a "...a creditable piece of work — calm, attentive and varied."

Naomi Penn of The Upcoming rated the film 4/5 and said called it "a truly stunning piece... a fascinating piece in which we learn about the man, as well as the "Beast"." Paul Chapinal of Film News rated it 3/5 and called it a "...no-frills documentary seeks to look at what lies behind Dennis Skinner's passion and determination." Daniel Falconer of Female First said "Nature of the Beast is a beautiful watch and one that will only solidify the love Skinner's fans have for him." Robert W Monk of Flickering Myth called it "An interesting and valuable account of one of British politics most noteworthy individuals." Carlie Newman of Close-Up Film rated it 4/5 and said, "There's only one Dennis Skinner and here he is in a film that is really worth watching." Sam Leith of the Financial Times said, "Mr Skinner is a clear example of a particular sort of orator doing a particular sort of politics."

On Rotten Tomatoes the film has a score of 89% based on reviews from 9 critics.

== Accolades ==
Year	Award	Category	Result
2017	East End Film Festival	Official Selection	Nominated
2017	Galway Film Fleadh	Official Selection	Nominated
2017	Sheffield Doc/Fest	Doc/Player	Nominated

== See also ==
- Political cinema
