= Odigitis festival =

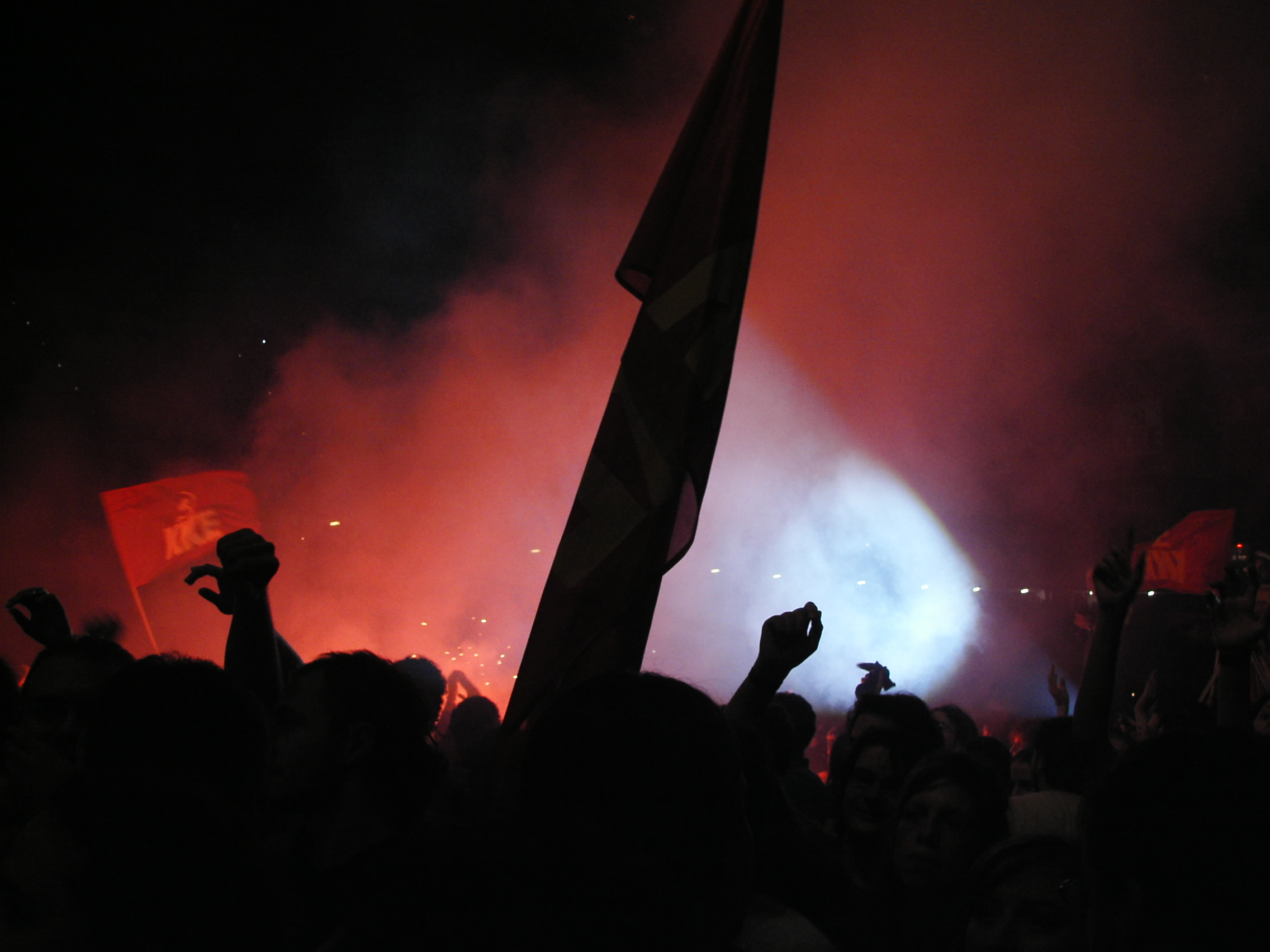
2007 Odigitis festival

The Festival of the Communist Youth of Greece and Odigitis (Greek: Φεστιβάλ της Κομμουνιστικής Νεολαίας Ελλάδας και του Οδηγητή, romanized: Festivál tis Kommounistikís Neolaías Elládas kai tou Odigití), known simply as KNE-Odigitis Festival (Greek: Φεστιβάλ ΚΝΕ-Οδηγητή, romanized: Festivál KNE-Odigití), are a series of annual festivals organized in most of the major towns and cities of Greece by the Communist Youth of Greece (KNE), with the biggest festival occurring in Athens.

The KNE-Odigitis Festival is a historic institution for the youth in Greece, as it began in 1975 and has been carried out every year since then. The first festival was announced on 14 August 1975 and the date when the festival happens is traditionally every September. Nowadays, it is usually organized in the Antonis Tritsis Metropolitan Park.

The festival is characterized by the different musicians that attend it, turning the festival into one that "boosts progressive artists". There are also history exhibitions, book exhibitions, and booths with representatives from other communist youths. Generally, KNE festival has a high attendance rate every year, being the biggest youth festival in Greece. Also, a lot of famous musicians, like Natasa Bofiliou and Vasilis Papakonstantinou host concerts every year at the festival.

The festival has a lot of importance for the history of the organization, as is proven by the fact that despite the internal party crisis of 1989-1991 happened because of what the general secretary of KNE, Giorgos Grapsas, said at the festival, in the following years the festival played an important role in the long-term final successful reorganization of the organization. Also, the organizations of KNE in different regions have differing pre-festival demonstrations, where artists and high-ranking party members participate and are called to speak, among others.

== See also ==
- Fête de l'Humanité
