= Young Communist League of Greece =

- Founded: November 1922
- Dissolved: 1943
- Merged into: EPON
- Ideology: Communism; Marxism-Leninism
- Mother party: KKE
- International affiliation: Young Communist International

Young Communist League of Greece (Greek: Oμοσπονδία Kομμουνιστικών Nεολαιών Eλλάδας (ΟΚΝΕ); OKNE) was the youth wing of the Communist Party of Greece. OKNE was founded on November 28, 1922. The journal I Neolaia (Η Νεολαία) became the official organ of OKNE. OKNE was a section of the Communist Youth International. Nikolaos Zachariadis became the leader of OKNE in 1924. In 1925, OKNE was banned by the Greek authorities, along with the Communist Party itself and all its affiliated organizations.

In 1943, OKNE was dissolved and replaced by another youth organization, the United Panhellenic Organization of Youth (EPON).

== See also ==
- Communist Youth of Greece
