= Odigitis =

Odigitis (Greek: Οδηγητής, lit. 'The Guider') is a Greek youth-oriented magazine and the official organ of the Central Council of the Communist Youth of Greece (KNE), the youth wing of the Communist Party of Greece (KKE). It is published monthly, usually every first Saturday of the month. The magazine can be bought from the local branches of KNE, the bookstores of Synchroni Epochi (the KKE publishing house), from KNE members in Greek universities and online, at the website of Synchhroni Epochi. It is sold for 2.5 euros.

Odigitis features around 40 pages, where it promotes the positions of the KKE to young people, contributes to the development of the political ties of KNE with the working youth and the university and school students, while it also communicates the positions of the KKE and KNE to the young people around Greece. Odigitis also features topics related to youth, analysed from a socialist perspective.

Odigitis' first issue was released on 22 September 1968, in conditions of illegality, because the then-ruling military regime had prohibited the political activities of the KKE and leftist political organisations in general. During the period when the KKE was outlawed, Odigitis released 44 issues. With the restoration of democracy, the KKE became a legal party in September 1974, and Odigitis began to circulate regularly, recording high sales until 1990. In September 1990, the creation of Synaspismos and its participation in government alongside the conservative New Democracy led to a split in KNE and the temporary suspension of Odigitis' publication. In September 1991, during the reconstruction of KNE, Odigitis began to be issued again as a monthly magazine.

In January 2025, KNE's Central Council initiated a new campaign to increase the circulation of Odigitis. The appearance and price of Odigitis was changed as a result of the inauguration of this campaign. Now, Odigitis' front page resembles a magazine more than a newspaper. Its price was increased from 2 to 2.5 euros.
