= Tolpuddle Martyrs' Festival =

Annual festival in Dorset, England

Tolpuddle Martyrs' festival
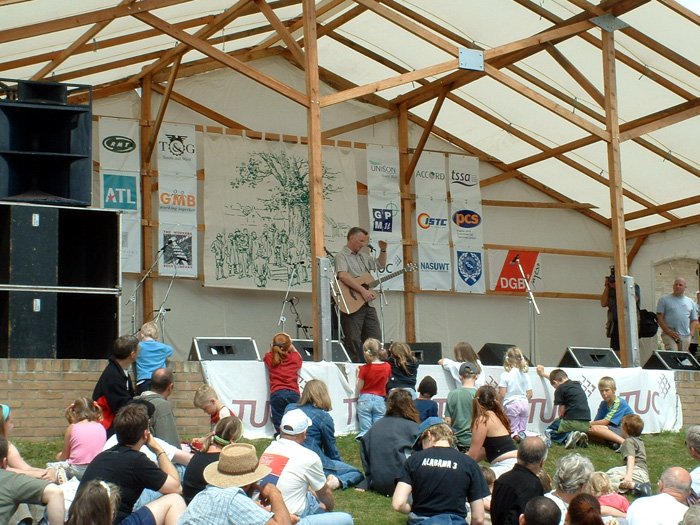
- Billy Bragg performing in 2004
- Date: Third week in July
- Frequency: Annually
- Locations: Tolpuddle, Dorset, England
- Attendance: 10,000
- Website: tolpuddlemartyrs.org.uk

The Tolpuddle Martyrs' Festival and Rally is an annual festival held in the village of Tolpuddle, in Dorset, England, which celebrates the memory of the Tolpuddle Martyrs. The event is a celebration of trade unionism and labour politics organised by the Trades Union Congress (TUC) South West office, with the support of unions. The festival is usually held on the third weekend of July, and features a parade of banners from trade unions, a memorial service, speeches and music.

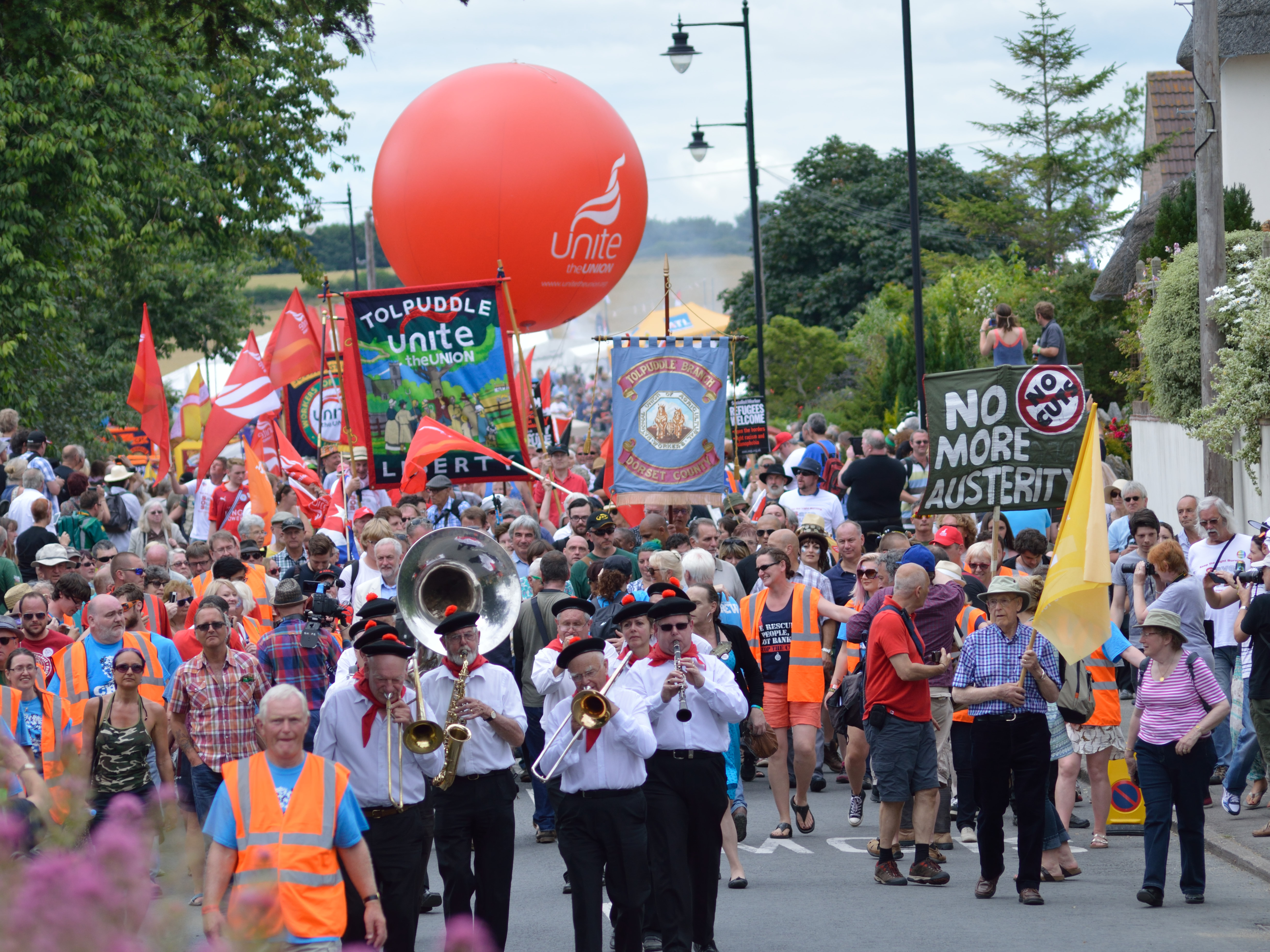
Parade, 2016

Each year, a wreath is laid at the grave of James Hammett, one of the martyrs, in the churchyard of Tolpuddle parish church.

The main festival events are held outside the Martyrs' Museum on the western edge of Tolpuddle village. The main speeches and performances take place on a small stage in front of the Tolpuddle cottages and museum, with audience space on the green. The adjacent field, as well as having camping space, has a marquee, Workers Beer Company bar and merchandise stalls.

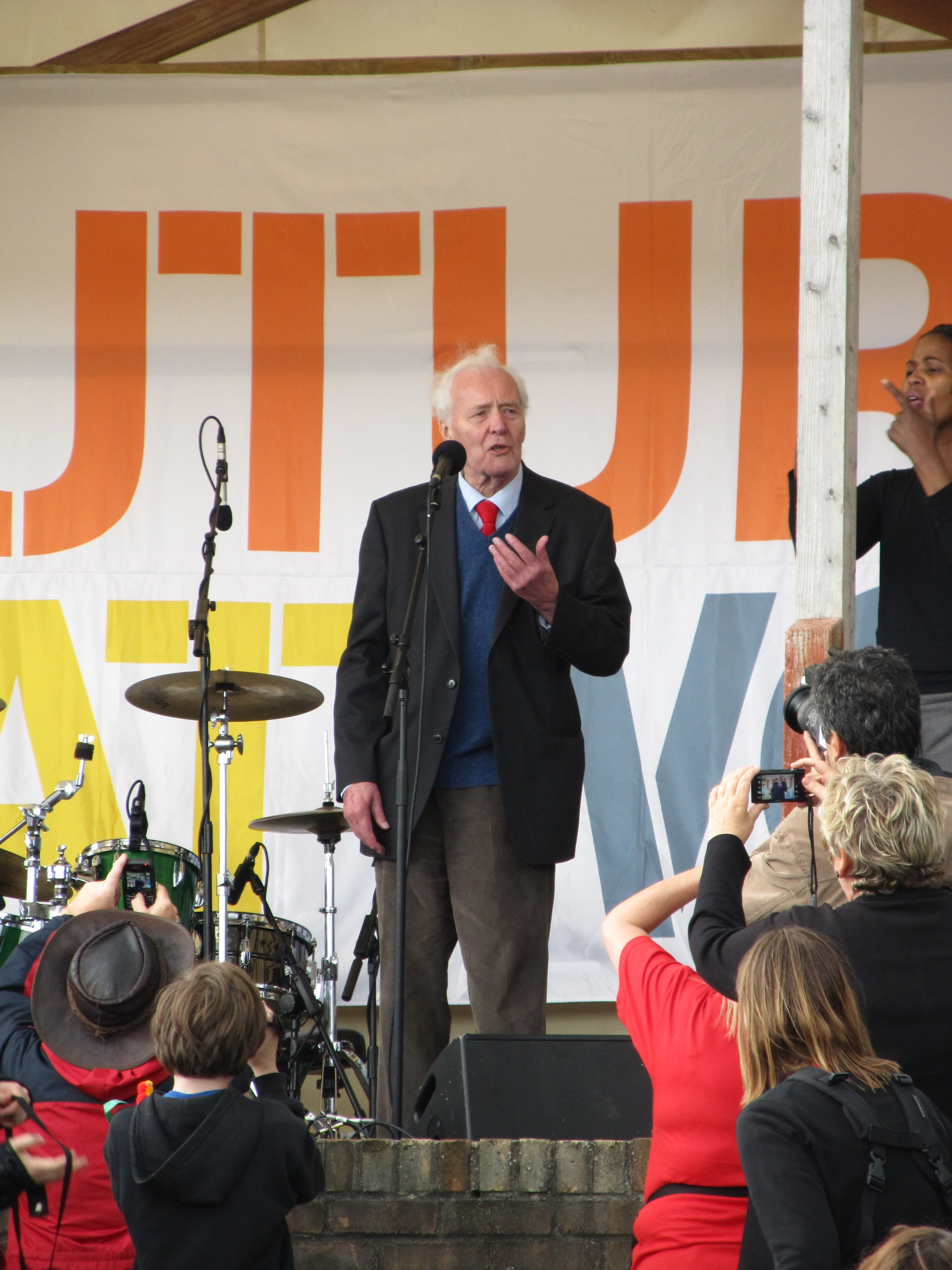
Tony Benn speaking in 2012

Past festivals have featured speeches from Palestinian diplomat Husam Zomlot, politicians Tony Benn, Dennis Skinner, Jim Knight, Estelle Morris, and former Labour leader Jeremy Corbyn, as well as British trade union leaders and international union organisers, especially from countries where organising unions is difficult, such as Iraq and Colombia. Musicians have included Emmanuel Jal, She Drew the Gun, Billy Bragg, Dick Gaughan and David Rovics.

== See also ==
- Durham Miners' Gala
- Labour festival
