= 2008 Burkina Faso bus crash =

Traffic collision

Details
- Date: 05:30, November 15, 2008
- Location: near Boromo, Burkina Faso

Statistics
- Bus: Bus
- Vehicles: Bus, truck
- Deaths: 66
- Injured: Unknown

The 2008 Burkina Faso bus crash was a bus accident on 5:30 am, November 15, 2008, that claimed the lives of more than 60 persons near the town of Boromo in Burkina Faso. A heavily-loaded truck carrying 80 people collided with an overloaded bus carrying 95 people on National Highway 1, about six kilometres from Boromo. The bus was on its way to Côte d'Ivoire. The run had started from Imasgho, and additional riders were picked up at Koudougou. The truck was traveling from Banfora. Following the collision, the bus caught fire and 54 persons were burned to death inside the bus. Eleven others who escaped died of their injuries. The victims were transported to the hospital at Souro Bobo. The truck driver reportedly survived the collision. Police investigators speculated that the truck driver had fallen asleep at the wheel, based on a lack of skid marks. The Burkina Faso Minister of Transport, Gilbert Noël Ouédraogo, commented that "We lament 96 victims, of whom 66 have died". It was considered the worst traffic accident in Burkina Faso since May 4, 2004, when 35 people died in the fiery collision of a bus and a gasoline truck at Niangoloko. On March 7, 1976, 23 UNESCO workers were killed after their bus fell into a ravine.

On December 7, a joint religious service was held at the national cathedral for the victims, who had been Christians and Muslims. The mass was presided over by the Roman Catholic Archbishop of Ouagadougou, Jean-Marie Compaore, and Protestant and Muslim clerics presided as well.
