= Fête de l'Humanité =

Annual fundraising event in France

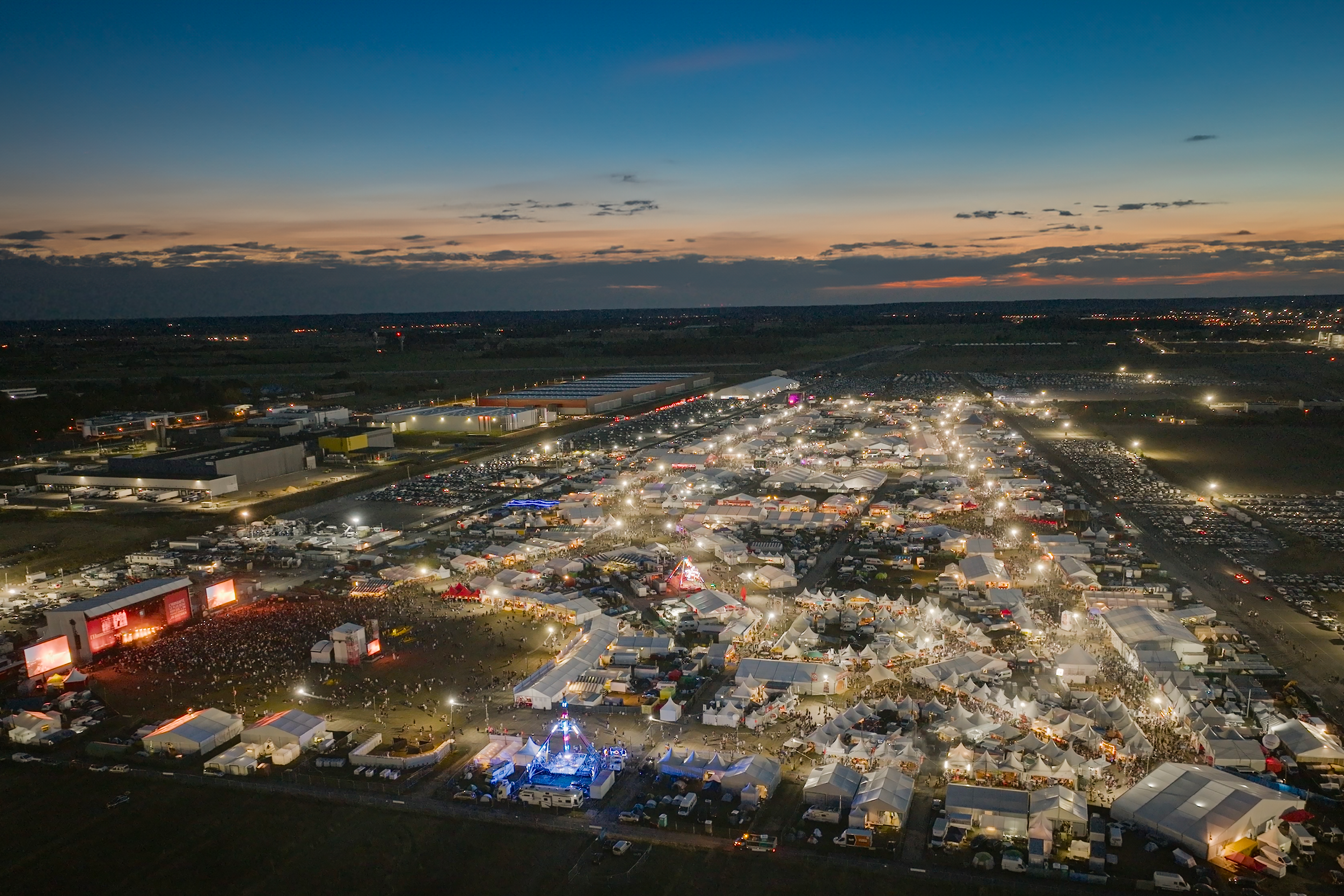
- Aerial view of the Fete de l'humanité 2023
- Inaugurated: September 1930
- Most recent: September 2026
- Next event: September 10, 2027
- Attendance: 800,000
- Organiser: L'Humanité
- Website: fete.humanite.fr

The Fête de l'Humanité (French pronunciation: [fɛt də lymaniˈte]; English: Festival of Humanity) is an event organised annually by French daily newspaper L'Humanité in order to fund itself. It is the largest popular gathering in France.

L'Humanité was created in 1904 by French socialist Jean Jaurès, but the first fête de l'Humanité took place in September 1930 to raise funds for the newspaper L'Humanité and 1000 people attended it. In 2010, the festival attracted 600,000 visitors. A new record was set in 2010, when 800,000 visitors participated in the festival.

The festival is organized and held almost exclusively by volunteers, since it exists to fund the newspaper.

Around 400 of stalls are scattered around the venue offering food and drinks with the stall holders coming from all over the world to be part of the event. The fête is a unique mix of politics and entertainment, with concerts happening alongside many debates, art exhibits, movies, etc. Because of the close relationship between l'Humanité and the French Communist Party, most of the volunteers are communists, even though most of the attendees are not.

The festival comprises many stages (Grande Scène (main stage), scène Zebrock (rock stage), scène reggae, P'tite Scène (smaller stage), and tens of smaller stages inside stalls). The Main Stage can accommodate about 100,000 spectators.

Due to its size, this festival is considered the kickoff of the left-wing's "political year" each year in September. Tens of thousands of left-wing activists gather there to celebrate and debate (from many political currents: communists, but also social-democrats, anarchists, Trotskyists, sympathizers of the left wing, etc.). They forget their disagreements for a festive weekend and get energized to start the year.

The festival is usually attended by the main figures of the French left wing (leaders of the French socialist party, Jean-Pierre Chevènement, Arlette Laguiller, Olivier Besancenot, Jean-Luc Mélenchon, etc.) as well as famous journalists (Edwy Plenel, Guillaume Meurice, etc.)

In 2025, the Fête de l'Humanité attracted 610,000 participants, selling out for the first time, while it welcomed 570,000 the next year.

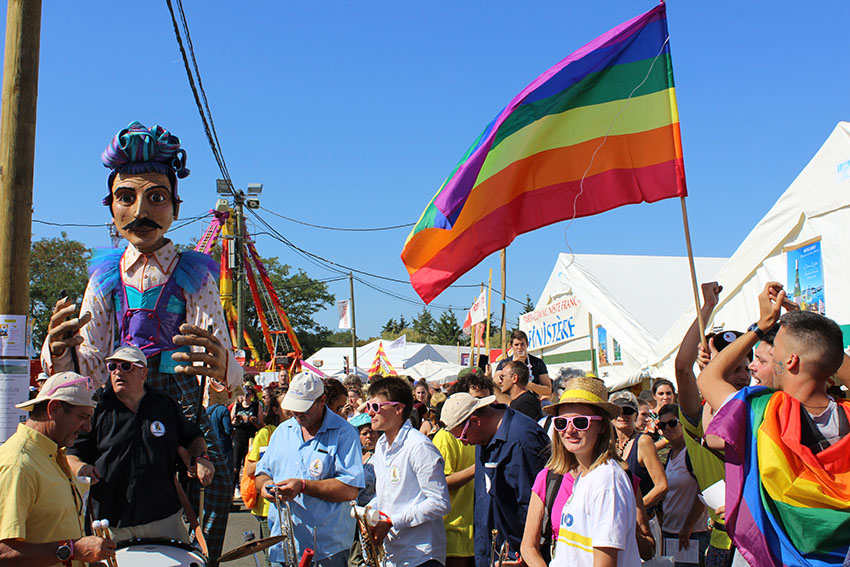
September 14, 2019. La Courneuve. L’Humarche des Fiertés with Les Grandes Personnes theater company.

== Artists involved ==
Many artists such as Roger Hodgson, Léo Ferré, Stevie Wonder, Pink Floyd, The Who, Deep Purple, Jacques Brel, Johnny Hallyday, Renaud, Chuck Berry, Jacques Dutronc, Leonard Cohen, and Joan Baez have performed at this event.

=== 1960 ===
- Paul Robeson
- Jacques Brel

=== 1961 ===
- Léo Ferré
- Robert Lamoureux
- Catherine Sauvage

=== 1962 ===
- Jean Ferrat
- Léo Ferré
- Georges Brassens

=== 1964 ===
- Eddy Mitchell
- Charles Trenet
- Annie Cordy
- Nana Mouskouri

=== 1966 ===
- Nino Ferrer
- Juliette Gréco
- Guy Béart
- Hugues Auffray

=== 1968 ===
- Mireille Mathieu

=== 1969 ===
- Jacques Dutronc

=== 1970 ===
- Pink Floyd

=== 1971 ===
- Claude Nougaro
- Joan Baez

=== 1972 ===
- The Who
- Mireille Mathieu
- Country Joe and the Fish
- Golden Earring
- Ewa Demarczyk

=== 1973 ===
- Chuck Berry
- Jerry Lee Lewis
- Alan Stivell
- Catherine Ribeiro

=== 1974 ===
- Leonard Cohen
- The Kinks
- Mikis Theodorakis

=== 1975 ===
- Jacques Higelin

=== 1976 ===
- Area
- Guy Bedos
- Maurice Béjart
- Julien Clerc
- Louise Forestier
- Bernard Lavilliers
- Maxime Le Forestier
- Bernard Lubat
- Claude Nougaro
- Quilapayún
- Archie Shepp
- Mikis Theodorakis
- Brenda Wootton

=== 1977 ===
- Alan Stivell
- Brand X
- Joan Pau Verdier
- Mustafa Al-Kurd

=== 1978 ===
- Genesis

=== 1979 ===
- Charles Trenet
- Catherine Ribeiro
- Gilles Vigneault

=== 1981 ===
- Ray Charles

=== 1982 ===
- Magma

=== 1983 ===
- Julien Clerc
- Robert Charlebois

=== 1984 ===
- The Communards
- Nina Hagen
- Renaud

=== 1985 ===
- Johnny Hallyday

=== 1986 ===
- Jacques Higelin
- Eddy Mitchell
- Sapho (singer)

=== 1987 ===
- Demis Roussos
- Kim Wilde

=== 1988 ===
- Kassav

=== 1990 ===
- Johnny Clegg
- Manu Dibango
- Dee Dee Bridgewater
- Paul Personne
- Colin James

=== 1991 ===
- Johnny Logan

=== 1992 ===
- MC Solaar
- The Kinks
- Calvin Russell
- Bernard Lavilliers
- Léo Ferré

=== 1993 ===
- Princess Erika
- Michel Fugain

=== 1994 ===
- Midnight Oil
- No One Is Innocent
- Johnny Clegg and Savuka

=== 1995 ===
- Jacques Higelin

=== 1996 ===
- Maxime Le Forestier
- Jimmy Cliff

=== 1997 ===
- Robert Charlebois
- Cesária Évora

=== 1998 ===
- Sinsemilia
- Cheb Mami
- Raggasonic

=== 2000 ===
- Eddy Mitchell

=== 2001 ===
- Manu Chao
- Ska-P

=== 2004 ===
- Youssou N'Dour
- The Rasmus
- Dub Incorporation

=== 2005 ===
- Asian Dub Foundation
- Bernard Lavilliers
- The Offspring
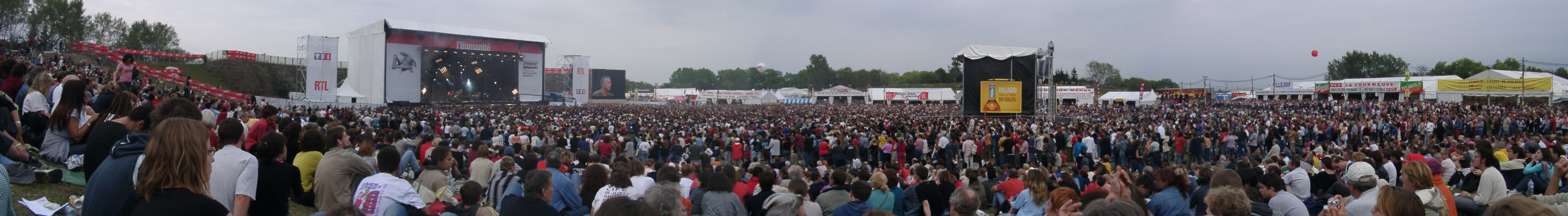
Bernard Lavilliers in Concert at Main Stage, 2005

=== 2007 ===
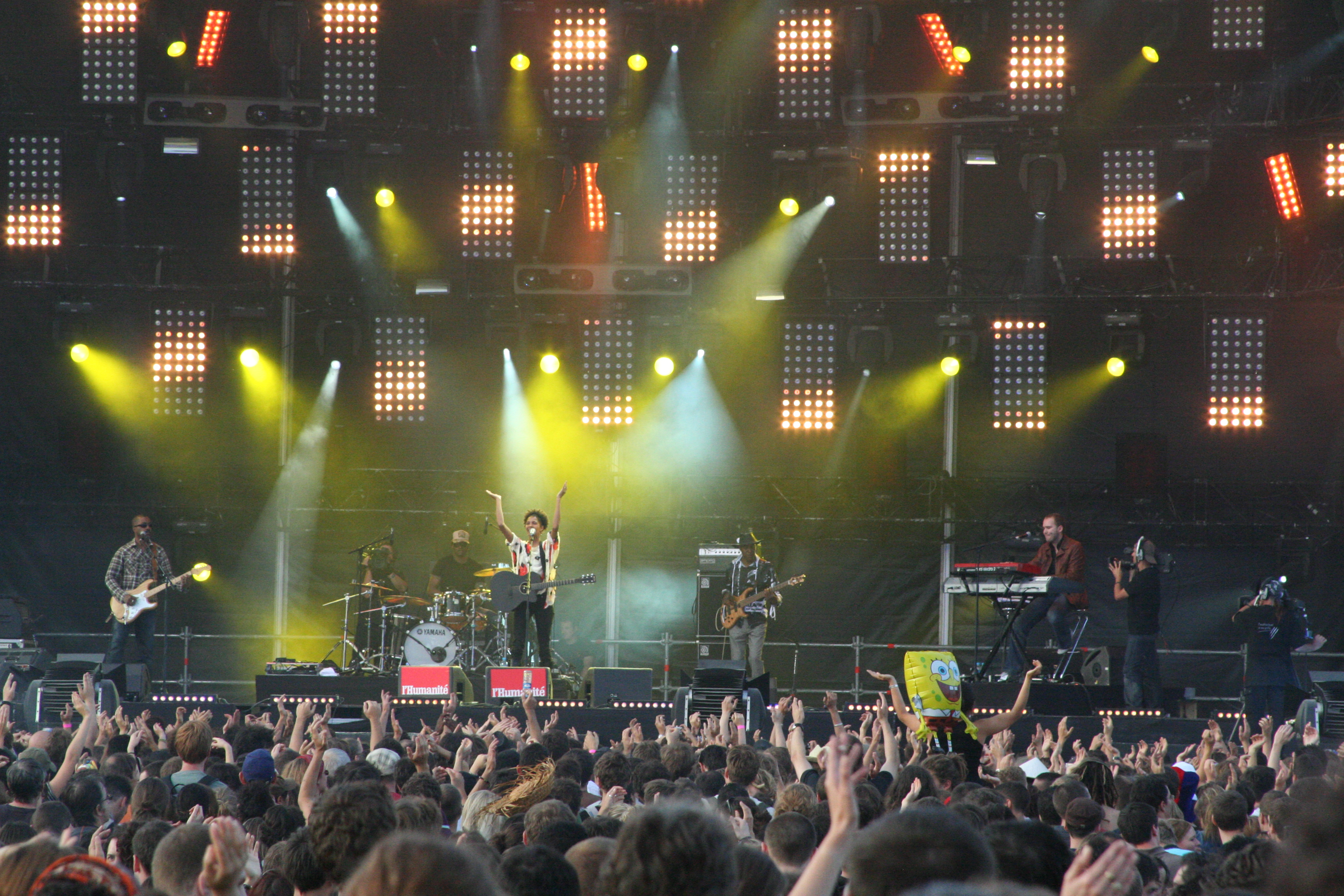
Ayo at the Fete de l'Humanité 2007

- The Stooges
- Razorlight
- Ayọ

=== 2008 ===
- Roger Hodgson
- Babyshambles
- NERD

=== 2009 ===
- Deep Purple
- The Kooks

=== 2010 ===
- Raggasonic
- The Prodigy
- Madness
- Simple Minds

=== 2011 ===
- Joan Baez
- Avril Lavigne

=== 2014 ===
- Richard Stallman

=== 2015 ===
- Texas (band)
- Manu Chao
- Shaka Ponk

=== 2016 ===
- The Chemical Brothers
- Michel Polnareff
- Lauryn Hill
- Alain Souchon
- Laurent Voulzy
- Joey Starr
- Caribbean Dandee
- Ludwig Von 88

=== 2017 ===
- Iggy Pop
- Renaud
- Feder
- Trust
- Dub Inc

=== 2018 ===
- Franz Ferdinand
- Julien Clerc
- Bernard Lavilliers
- Bigflo & Oli
