= Word Power Books =

Coordinates: 55°56′41″N 3°11′08″W

Word Power Books is an independent radical bookshop and publisher based in Edinburgh, Scotland. They have published works by both established and lesser known writers in Scotland including James Kelman, Tom Leonard and National Collective. They also organise a regular Book Fringe festival during August and the annual Edinburgh Independent Radical Book Fair.

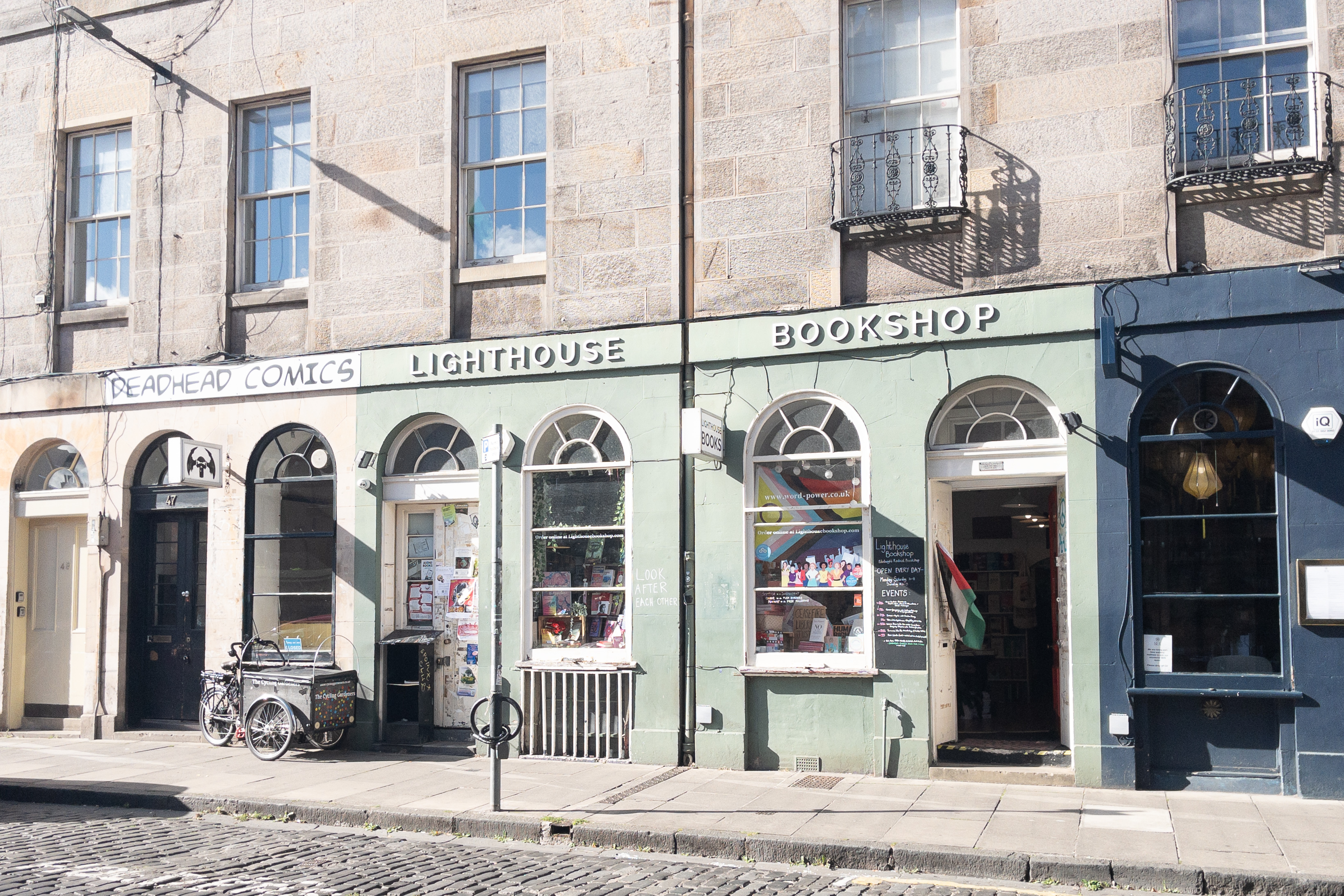
Exterior of Lighthouse Bookshop

The shop is now Lighthouse Bookshop, with the tagline "Edinburgh's Radical Bookshop".

== History ==
Word Power Books first opened in 1994 by Elaine Henry. in the 1980s Henry had worked in a feminist bookshop in Edinburgh named 'Womanzone'. After Womanzone closed in 1986 Henry felt there was still a need for a radical bookshop in Edinburgh and so began working towards establishing Word Power. The shop opened in November 1994, with a formal opening in December by Booker Prize winning novelist James Kelman.

Since opening it has gained a reputation for supporting non-mainstream writers and ideas.

In February 2017, Henry announced that she was stepping down "for personal reasons rather than the market" and was looking to sell the shop, leaving its future unclear.

The new owners renamed it as Lighthouse Bookshop when they took over the shop in 2017. It has a focus for the city’s queer community, and includes a range of radical fiction and non-fiction. They also organise several festivals including the Book Fringe in August.

Word Power Books still remains as a publisher, although as of 2026 this is on hold with the focus on the bookshop.

== Publications ==
Word Power Books has published a number of releases by Scottish writers, including, James Kelman, Tom Leonard and National Collective.

== Book Fringe and Radical Book Fair ==
Word Power organise a radical Edinburgh Book Fringe alongside the Edinburgh Festivals each August.

Since 1996 Word Power have organised the Edinburgh Independent and Radical Book Fair each October in Leith, with the aim of supporting small and independent presses who struggle to gain space in bookshops.
