= Raggasonic =

French ragga group

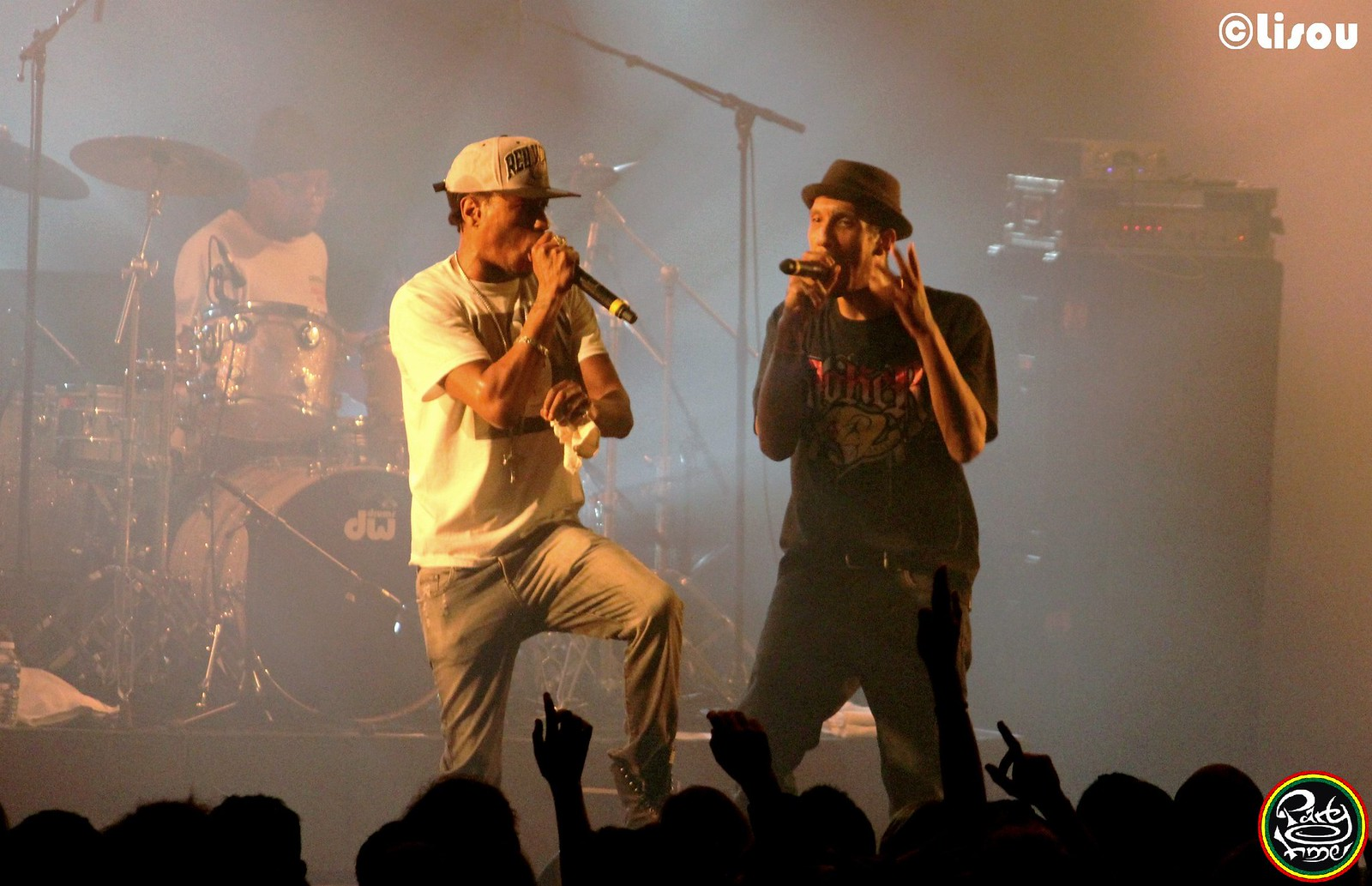
Raggasonic on stage

Raggasonic are a French ragga group composed of Big Red (born Stéphane Joaquim), Daddy Mory (born Mory Samaké) and Frenchie

They were discovered after the compilation Rapattitude was released in the early 1990s. Two official albums were released by Raggasonic: Raggasonic (1995) and Raggasonic 2 (1997), both produced by Frenchie.

The two members of Raggasonic, Big Red and Daddy Mory each pursuing solo careers. In 2012 they came back with a new album, Raggasonic 3.

== In popular culture ==
Their hit "Sors avec ton gun" was released in 1995 in conjunction with the cult French film La Haine directed by Mathieu Kassovitz.

== Discography ==
=== Albums ===
Year	Album	Peak positions	Notes
Year	Album	FR	Notes
1995	Raggasonic: Record label: Virgin Records	15	Track list: 1. Les riches (featuring Desmond); 2. Original; 3. J'entends parler 4. No money no friend 5. Kisder; 6. Mythos; 7. Aiguisé comme une lame (featuring NTM); 8. Poussière d'ange 9. Ainsi va la vie 10. Bleu Blanc Rouge; 11. Légalisez la ganja 12. International (featuring Desmond & Leaf-Nuts)
1997	Raggasonic 2: Record label: Virgin Records	32	Track list: 1. Intro: frenchie / Frenchie; 2. Rude boy 3. Laisse le peuple s'exprimer feat. Supa; 4. Au nom de qui?; 5. Oppressions; 6. A l'ancienne 7. Classic; 8. Interlude 1; 9. En quelques mots 10. Mental feat. Mykal Roze; 11. Faut pas me prendre pour un âne 12. Je ne sais pas 13. Alcoolo; 14. Interlude 2; 15. Raggasonic Crew feat. Starkey Banton
2012	Raggasonic 3: Record label: PIAS Recordings France	16	Track list: 1. Raggasonic 3; 2. Mon sound 3. Ca va clasher 4. Identité; 5. Dans la rue 6. Lukie D interlude 7. Changer l'histoire 8. La vie 9. Hot It Up; 10. Real Friends; 11. Ma couleur 12. Grime style 13. Peux pas check ça 14. Monkey Star

Compilation albums

Year	Album	Peak positions	Notes
Year	Album	FR	Notes
2004	Rude Best of 95-99	–	Track list: 1. J'entends parler 2. Kisder; 3. Aiguise comme une lame 4. Ainsi va la vie 5. Bleu Blanc Rouge; 6. Legalisez la ganja 7. Rude Boy; 8. Laisse le peuple s'exprimer 9. Au nom de qui 10. Mental; 11. Faut pas me prendre pour ane 12. Sors avec ton gun 13. La ramene pas 14. Raggasonic Crew (Remix by Demon); 15. Faut pas me prendre pour ane (Remix by Jus Jase); 16. A l'ancienne (DJ Tools Remix)

=== Singles ===
Year	Single	Peak positions	Album
Year	Single	FR	Album
1998	"Laisse le peuple s'exprimer" (feat. Supa)	95	Raggasonic 2
2012	"Ça va clasher"	152	Raggasonic 3
