= Festa de l'Unità =

Annual festival organized by the Italian Communist Party

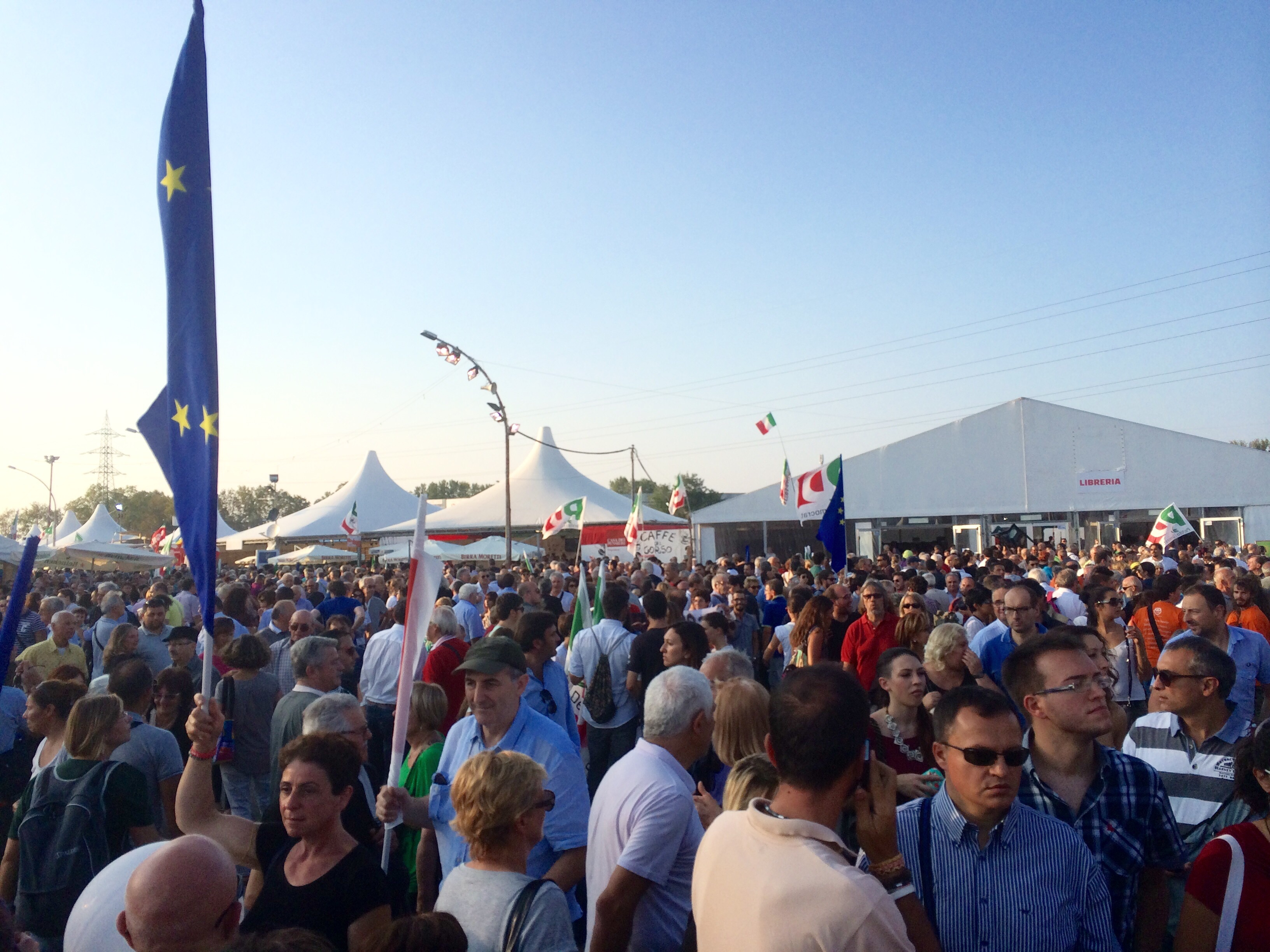
Festa de l'Unità in Bologna, 2014.

Festa de l'Unità is an annual social-democratic festival in Italy, originally organised by the Italian Communist Party (PCI) to finance and spread its official newspaper l'Unità (Unity), and now organised by the Democratic Party. It is often misspelled Festa dell'Unità ("Unity party"), since people forget where the name comes from.

The event is generally organized as many separated happenings, usually one for each city, but where the PCI was more present, every local branch organized its own happening and often all of them collaborated to the organization of a large one as well. Typical aspects are political conferences, low-price or free typical foods, live music, prize games and street markets. Small events start in July, but the main happenings take place in September.

While the political aspect was preponderant in earlier years, and is at times still important, it has developed with time into a social event for the youth (music events and discos) and elderly people (talking about the political adventures of their past and dancing swing).

In some parts of Italy, especially in Emilia-Romagna and Tuscany, each and every small village seems to have its own "festa de l'Unità", which is often the biggest social event of the year. In Bologna and in Florence, they have developed into a two-week-long, tens-of-thousands-people-packed event that has little resemblance to the original political gathering, and are instead two of the biggest attractions for young people in the vicinity.

Following the birth in 2007 of the Democratic Party the name of the Festa dell'Unità was changed, at a national level, to the Festa Democratica. At the provincial level, however, and for local party organisations, the traditional name "Festa de l'Unità" was retained, while elsewhere new hybrid appellations were adopted such "Festa del Partito Democratico" or "Festa di [place name]". The traditional name was restored in 2014, after the election of Matteo Renzi as new national Secretary of the party.

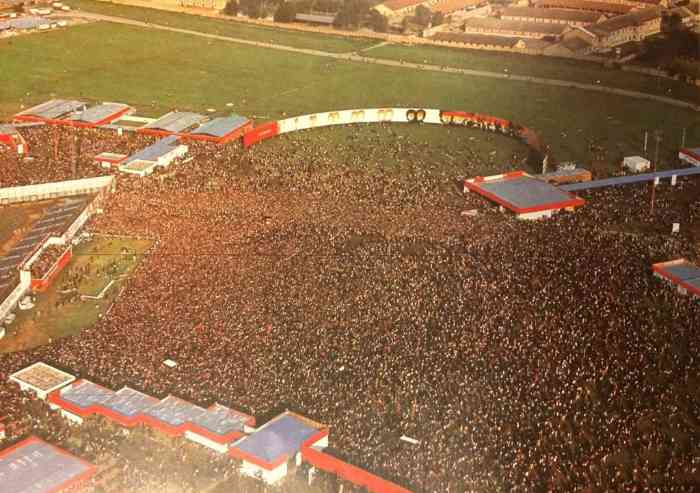
Political speech by Enrico Berlinguer on 18 September 1977, at the Festa de l’Unità in Modena.

== See also ==
- Italian Communist Party
- Democratic Party (Italy)
