= United Panhellenic Organization of Youth =

Youth wing of the Greek National Liberation Front

United Panhellenic Organization of Youth Ενιαία Πανελλαδική Οργάνωση Νέων
- Founded: 23 February 1943
- Dissolved: 1958
- Ideology: Anti-fascism; Republicanism; Communism; Left-wing nationalism
- Mother party: EAM
- International affiliation: World Federation of Democratic Youth

The United Panhellenic Organization of Youth, abbreviated EPON (Greek: Ενιαία Πανελλαδική Οργάνωση Νέων – ΕΠΟΝ), was a Greek resistance organization that was active during the Axis Occupation of Greece in World War II. EPON was the youth wing of the National Liberation Front (EAM) organization, and was established on 23 February 1943 after the merger of ten earlier political and resistance youth organizations. Along with EAM and its other affiliates, EPON was dissolved judicially at the beginning of the Greek Civil War but continued to operate illegally until 1958.

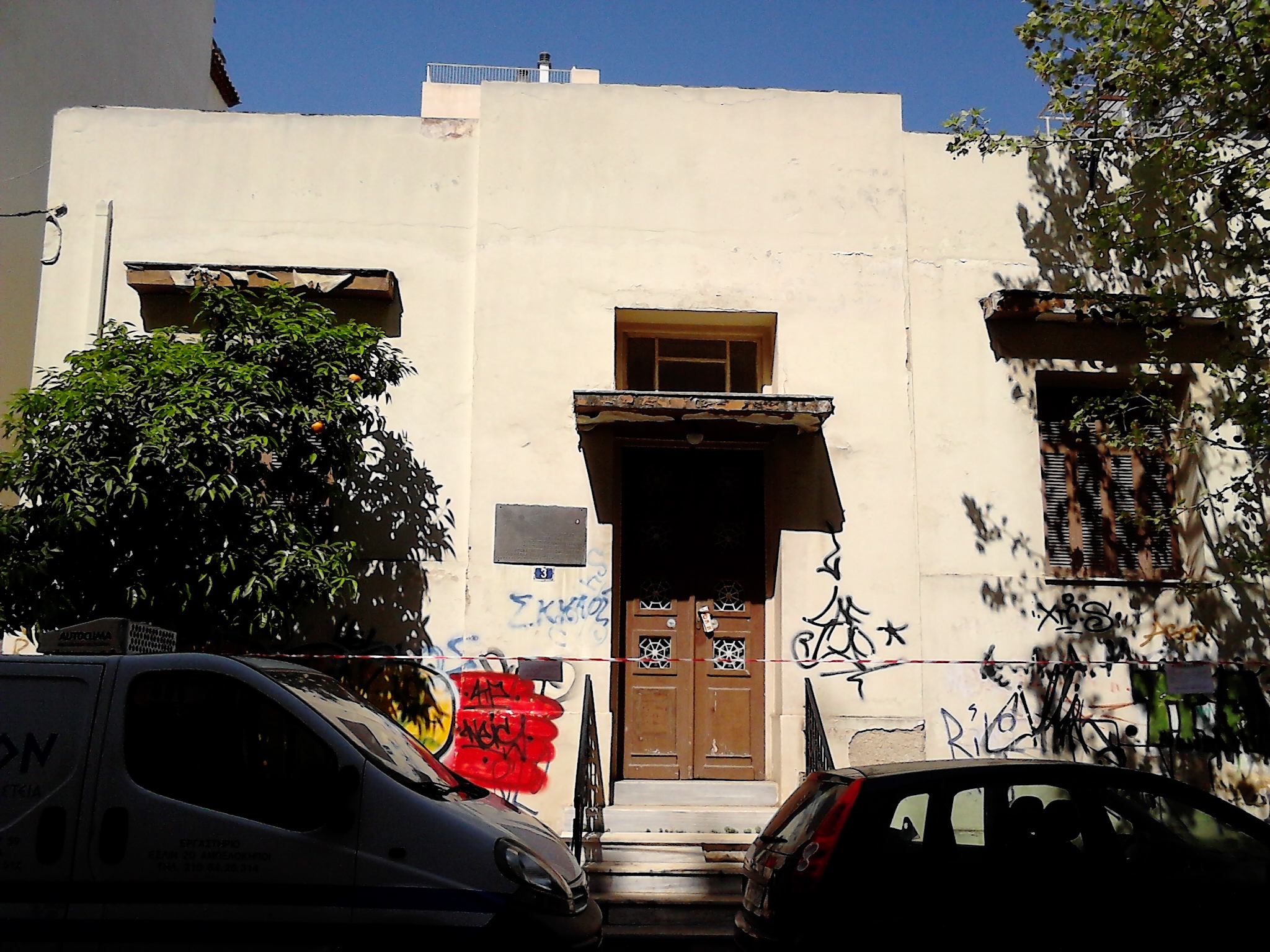
The house where EPON was founded, Ampelokipoi, Athens

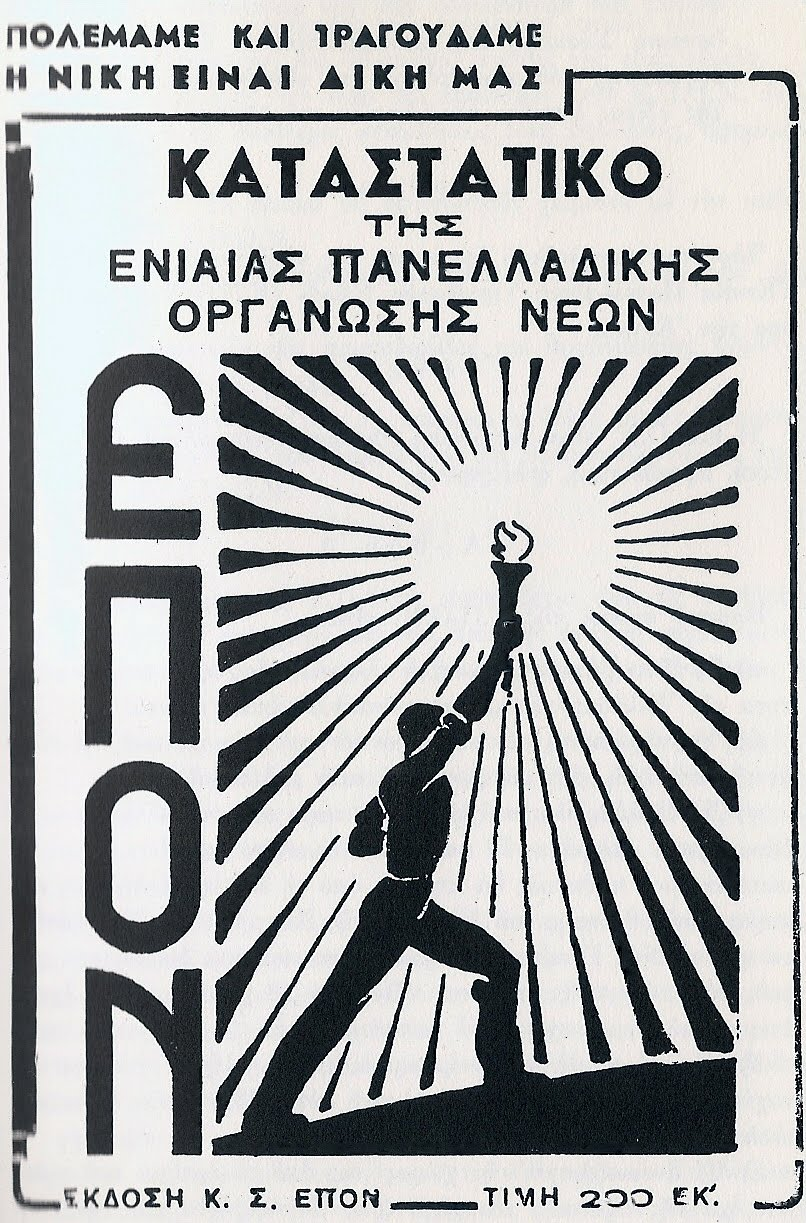
Booklet with the charter of EPON, 1943

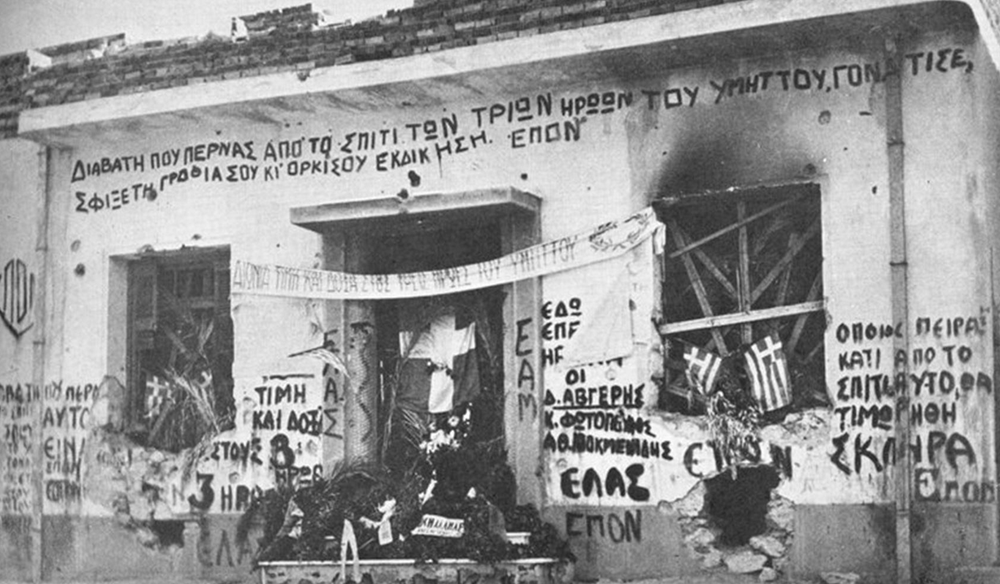
Destroyed house where three members of EPON were killed in battle, Athens, April 1944

== See also ==
- Young Communist League of Greece
