= Les Grandes Personnes (street theater) =

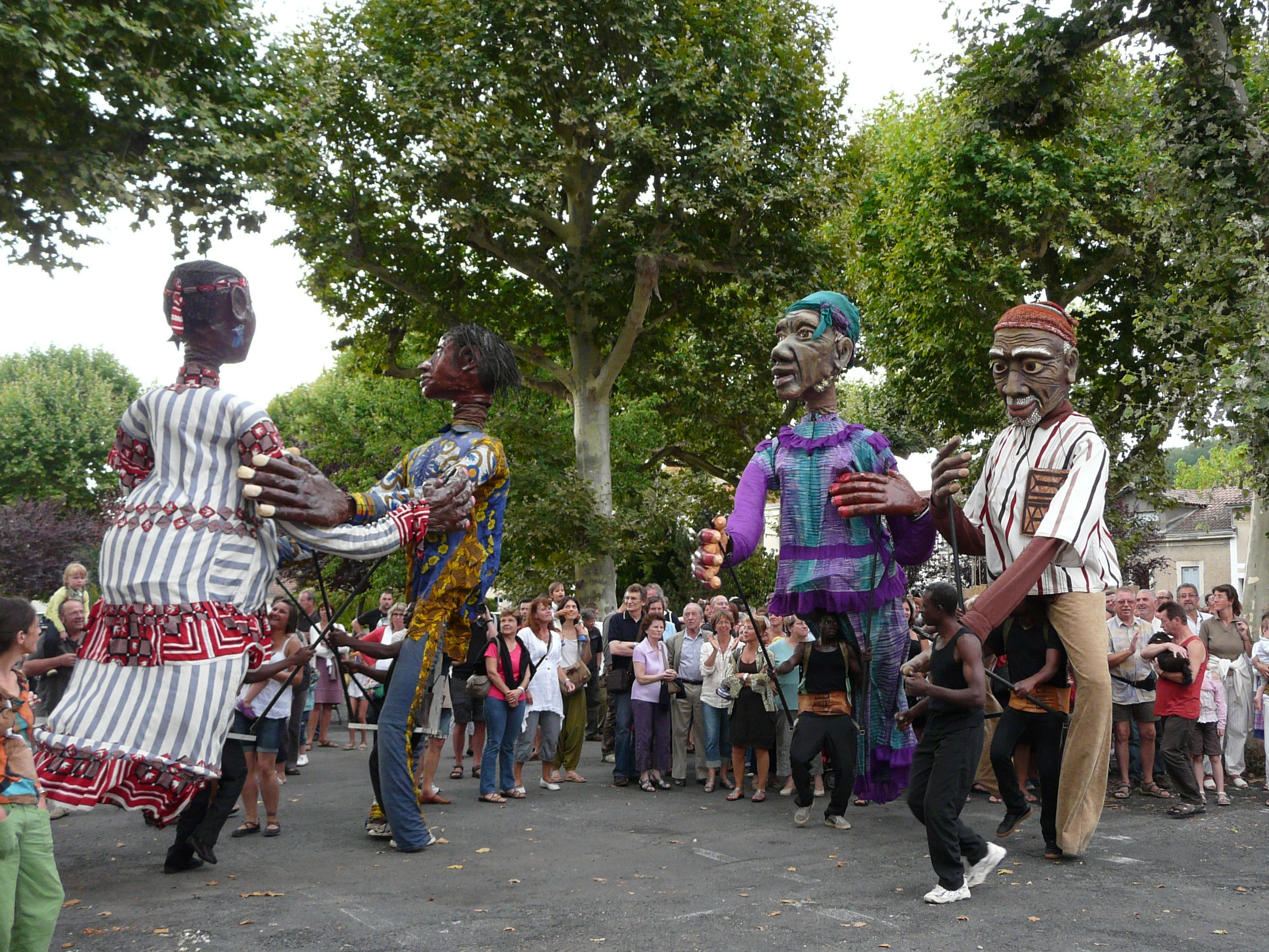
The Grandes Personnes de Boromo during the Mimos festival.

Les Grande Personnes (“Big People”) are a street theater collective which has organized events with giant marionettes and object theater, with an important role for model art.

== Description ==
Begun in 1998 in the after the Carnaval of Saint-Denis, theater group Grandes Personnes brought sculpture to the streets. Their team includes modelers and builders, as well as actors and puppeteers. Christophe Evette is the artistic coordinator.

Specializing participatory shows, the group has developed methodologies of building giant marionettes, using paper mache, local and recycled materials. It has helped found around twenty associations of collaborative workshops in several countries, include the Grandes Personnes d'Afrique (Big People of Africa) — the Marionettes of Boromo in Burkina Faso (2003), Sueños de Mache in Valparaíso, Chile (2008), Giant Match in South Africa (2010), and Giant Marionettes of Mozambique in Maputo (2012).

Established in Aubervilliers, at the outskirts of the artist village Villa Mais d'Ici, the Grandes Personnes have created large “ambulations” (Allebrilles, festival of lights, Lyon, 2013), vast urban sets (Théranthropes, Nanterre, 2011), as well as more intimate shows such as À la corde (2008), La Ligne jaune (2012), which tells the epic story of the Renault factory in Cléon with figurines called santons, or La Bascule (2014), which traces the last decade of the death penalty in France with rag dolls.
