= Durham Miners' Gala =

Annual festival in Durham, England

Coordinates: 54.776°N 1.573°W

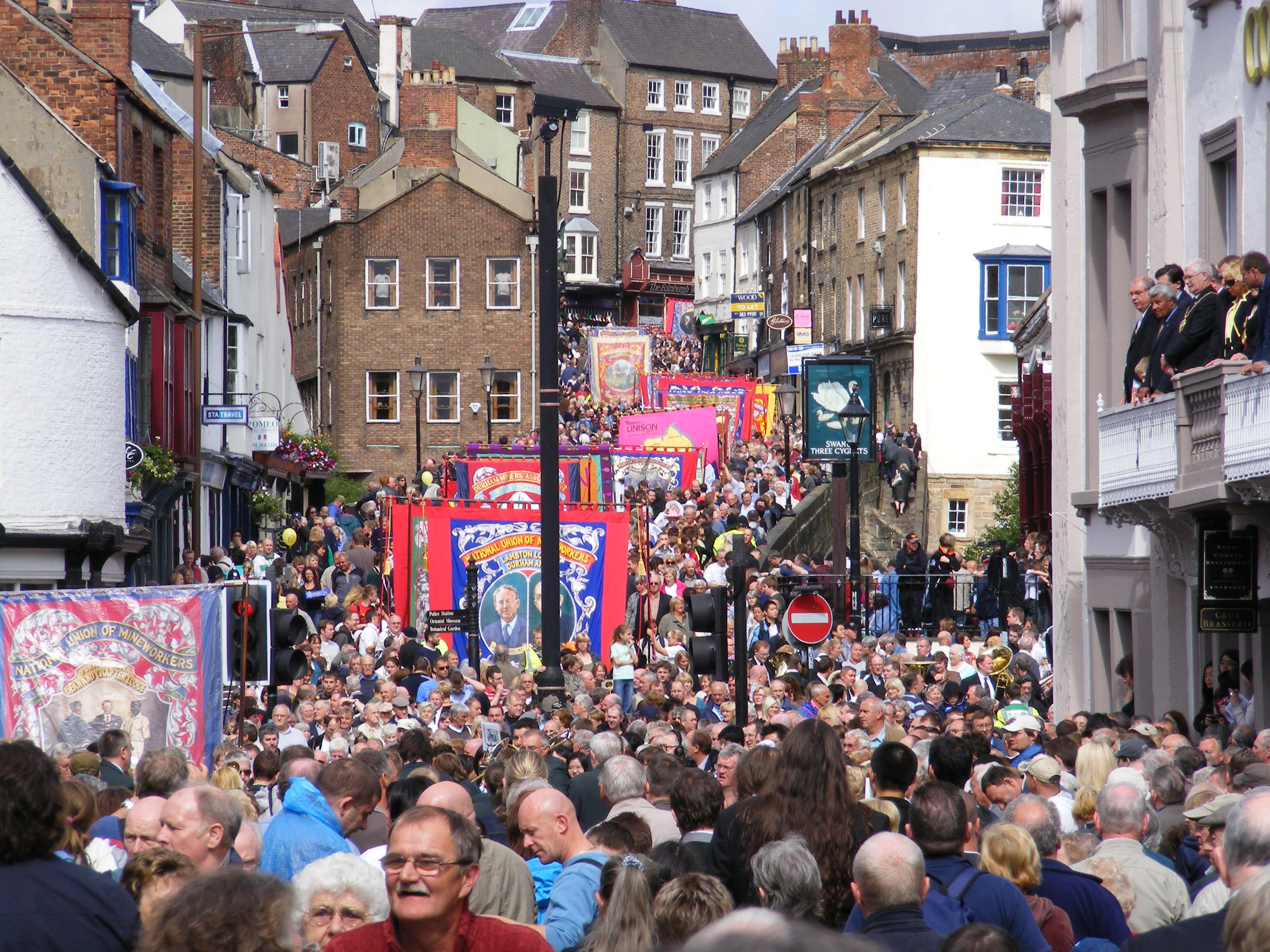
- Durham Miners Gala 2008 at Old Elvet Bridge
- Date: Second Saturday in July
- Location: Durham
- Inaugurated: 1871
- Most recent: 11 July 2026
- Organiser: Durham Miners' Association

The Durham Miners' Gala is a large annual gathering and labour festival held on the second Saturday in July in the city of Durham, England. It is associated with the coal mining heritage (and particularly that of miners' trade unionism) of the Durham Coalfield, which stretched throughout the traditional County of Durham. It is also locally called "The Big Meeting" or "Durham Big Meeting". In the context of the Durham Miners' Gala, "gala" is usually pronounced /ˈgeɪlə/ rather than the more common pronunciation /ˈgɑːlə/.

Its highlight consists of a parade of banners, each typically accompanied by a brass band, which are marched to the old Racecourse, where political speeches are delivered. In the afternoon, a miners' service is held in Durham Cathedral, which may include the blessing of any new banners.

== History ==
The gala developed out of the miners' trade unionism, the first union being established in 1869. The Durham Miners' Association organised the first gala, which was held in 1871 in Wharton Park, Durham. At its peak during the 1950s and 1960s, the gala attracted more than 300,000 people. Despite the decline and eventual closure of all of Britain's deep mines, the event has continued, and in the 2000s has attracted attendances estimated at 100,000.

The gala has seen infrequent cancellations since its founding. It was cancelled from 1915 to 1918 because of the First World War; in 1921, 1922 and 1926 because of strikes; and from 1940 to 1945 because of the Second World War. The gala was "a serious political gathering" for much of its history, "forgoing the carnival buzz" until the "strike victories in 1972 and 1974 promoted a more jovial atmosphere," which continues to this day, in a celebration of working class and mining heritage. The 1984–85 miners' strike, which saw miners across the Durham Coalfield strike, also led to the gala being called off in 1984. The most recent cancellations were in 2020 and 2021 because of the coronavirus pandemic.

The event has also been associated with the left wing of the Labour Party. In 2012, Labour Party leader Ed Miliband addressed the 128th gala; he was the first Labour Party leader to speak at the gala for 23 years, the previous being Neil Kinnock in 1989. In 2015, all four candidates in the Labour leadership election appeared at the gala, but only Jeremy Corbyn, who had already secured the endorsement of the Durham Miners' Association, was asked to give a speech.

In September 2019, a feature-length documentary about the Durham Miners' Gala was released. Peter Bradshaw, in a review for The Guardian, described the documentary as a "rich, heartfelt and intimate tribute" to the gala.

== Banners ==
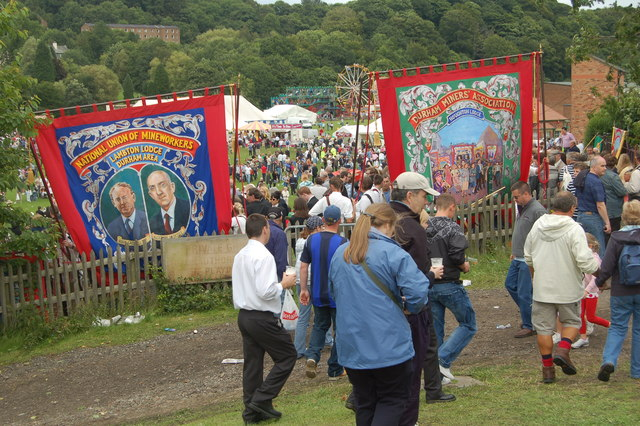
Banners in the 2008 parade

Most banners in the gala represent lodges of the National Union of Mineworkers (NUM) in the Durham Area. However other unions have also been represented, particularly in recent years, as well as union banners from other parts of the UK, including NUM lodges of the Yorkshire branch and South Wales.

They are made of silk, are rectangular and hang from a cross member, from which guide ropes are held by those carrying it.

Many banners contain explicit socialist or communist references, having renderings of Marx, Lenin, and other prominent figures such as miners' leaders, or politicians. Chopwell, often referred to as "Little Moscow", has the only banner (the 1955 version) that contains images of both Marx and Lenin (as well as the hammer and sickle). The 1935 Chopwell banner toured the Soviet Union and is thought to reside somewhere in Moscow today. Socialist expressions also take the form of captions—for example, "Socialism through evolution" and "Need before greed" (on Blackhall Lodge's banner).

Christian themes having a socialist resonance also figure on many banners. Three successive banners of Lumley Lodge (1929, 1960, 2005) have depicted the "Lion and Lamb" and "Turning Swords into Ploughshares" images from the book of Isaiah on either side, uniquely the only all biblical banners in the Durham coalfield. One of the most common biblical images featured is a depiction of the Parable of the Good Samaritan, with the words "Go ye, and do likewise" nearly always captioned below.

More recently residents in former pit villages have restored or even created banners. This has involved the reintegration of collieries that had left the gala. Some banners, such as Spennymoor's, represent a group of former local collieries rather than individual ones. These have received funding from the Heritage Lottery Fund.
