= Benaroya =

Benaroya may refer to:

== People ==
- Avraam Benaroya (1887–1979), Jewish socialist in the Ottoman Empire
- Jack Benaroya (1921–2012), American philanthropist and civic leader in Seattle, Washington
- Michael Benaroya (born 1981), American film producer

== Other uses ==
- Benaroya Hall, home of the Seattle Symphony in Seattle, Washington, United States
- Benaroya Research Institute, Seattle, Washington non-profit organization
