= Ottomanism =

Concept that emerged towards the end of the Tanzimat period

The idea behind the adoption of a national flag was inspired by Ottomanism — a common banner which all citizens of the empire could rally under regardless of race or religious group

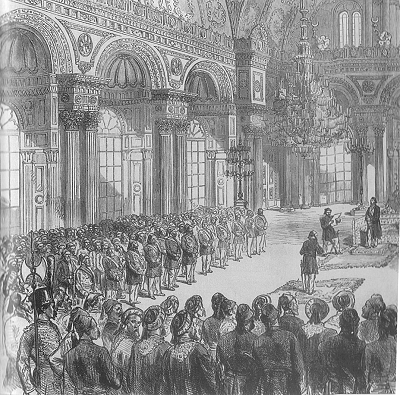
Opening of the first Ottoman Parliament after the proclamation of the Ottoman Constitution of 1876

Ottomanism or Osmanlılık (Ottoman Turkish: عثمانلولق, Turkish: Osmanlıcılık. French: Ottomanisme (Note: In languages of ethnic minorities: Bulgarian: Османизъм; Armenian: Օսմանիզմ)) was a concept which developed prior to the 1876–1878 First Constitutional Era of the Ottoman Empire. Its proponents believed that it could create the Unity of the Peoples, İttihad-ı Anasır, needed to keep ethnoreligious-based millets from tearing the empire apart. This ideology was closely related to state nationalism aimed at preventing the collapse of the Ottoman Empire in response to the rise of nationalism.

== History ==
=== Beginning ===
Thinkers such as Montesquieu (1689–1755) and Rousseau (1712–1778), as well as the events of the French Revolution of 1789, strongly influenced Ottomanism. It promoted equality among the millets. The idea of Ottomanism originated amongst the Young Ottomans (founded in 1865) in concepts such as the acceptance of all separate ethnicities in the Empire regardless of their religion, i.e., all were to be "Ottomans" with equal rights. In other words, Ottomanism held that all subjects were equal before the law. Ideally, all citizens would share a geographical area, a language, culture, and a sense of a "non-Ottoman" party who were different from them. The essence of the millet system of confessional groupings was not dismantled, but secular organizations and policies were applied. Primary education, conscription, head tax and military service were to be applied to non-Muslims and Muslims alike.

=== Development of the concept ===
Ottomanism was inspired and formed as a reaction to European ideas and the growing Western involvement in the Ottoman Empire. Following the Tanzimat reforms begun in 1839, Ottomanism developed from a need to bring the Empire together. The Ottomans feared the growing threat the Europeans posed, especially after events like the 1838 Treaty of Balta Liman, which allowed for British merchants in the Empire to be taxed equally to the locals, and the growing concern of the great powers over the treatment of Christians within the Empire. The Ottomans thought that if they could unite the Empire fully under one state entity, then they would be stronger and the Europeans would have a harder time encroaching on Ottoman territory, as well as on Ottoman people. Prior to the reforms of the first half of the 19th century, the Empire was vastly split into many small communities that mostly governed themselves. The Sultan oversaw these communities, but most areas adhered to their own laws and beliefs. This accounted in part for the success of the Ottoman Empire: the Sultan didn't force any major changes on populations as he conquered them. Because of struggle for self-determination, the concept of nation-states with shared senses of identities began to rise in Europe, most notably with the Greek War of Independence of 1821–1830, which also started affecting the various other peoples of the Ottoman Empire. From these instances, Ottomanism developed as a social and political response, with the hope of saving the Empire from downfall.

=== Ottoman nationality ===
The major precursors to Ottomanism were the Reformation Edict of 1856, which promised full equality under the law regardless of religion, and the Ottoman Nationality Law of 1869, which created a common Ottoman citizenship irrespective of religious or ethnic affiliation. The Ottoman Nationality Law, promulgated on January 19, 1869, was one of those laws that combined elements of the principles of jus soli and jus sanguinis and thus resembled the French Nationality Law, specifically the 1851 formulation, which it is argued to have been inspired by. The nationality legislation was a 19th-century concept, and the Ottoman Empire adopted it early. The Ottoman Nationality Law appeared before any commonly-adopted international concept of the basic elements of this legislation. Many in the non-Muslim millets and many Muslims rejected Ottomanism. Non-Muslims perceived it as a step towards dismantling their traditional privileges. Meanwhile, the Muslims saw it as the elimination of their own superior position. There were claims that Ottomanism was a reaction to the Tanzimat, the 1839-1876 era of intensive restructuring of the Ottoman Empire by the bureaucratic elite. The inauguration of the General Assembly in 1876 contributed to the spirit of reform, as all millets were represented in this bicameral assembly.

=== Young Turk Revolution ===
Ottomanism enjoyed a revival during the Young Turk Revolution of 1908, and during the Second Constitutional Era of 1908 to 1920. It lost most of its adherents during the First Balkan War of 1912–13, when the Ottoman Empire lost most of its European territories inhabited by minorities.

Avram Benaroya and the Socialist Workers' Federation of Thessalonica regarded the 1908 Revolution, carried out by the Young Turks with the aid of Macedonian and Armenian revolutionary committees, as an opportunity for a multinational Ottoman political community to develop. The same principle informed Benaroya's socialist organizational model, in which separate national groups could preserve their languages and cultures while joining regional federations united within a broader Ottoman federation. The Armenian Revolutionary Federation (ARF) likewise supported an Austro-Marxist-style federative approach and envisioned Armenian, Turkish, and Slavic socialists forming a kind of "Ottoman International."; however, the growing turn toward Turkish nationalism among the CUP, which was the leading faction within the Young Turks, progressively undermined the multinational character of the new constitutional regime.

== See also ==
- Vatan Yahut Silistre
- Byzantinism
- Neo-Ottomanism
- Rise of nationalism in the Ottoman Empire
