= Greek legislative election, 1915 =

The term Greek legislative election, 1915 may refer to:

- Greek legislative election, May 1915
- Greek legislative election, December 1915
