= Margaret Allen (surgeon) =

American surgeon and academic

- Born: 1948 (age 77–78)
- Education: Swarthmore College, University of California, San Diego, Oakland Medical Center
- Occupation: Cardiothoracic surgeon

Margaret Allen (born 1948) is an American cardiothoracic surgeon and an academic at the Benaroya Research Institute. She was the first woman to perform a heart transplant and is a former president of the United Network for Organ Sharing.

== Early life ==
Allen was raised in Des Moines, Iowa, where she became interested in science at a young age. She gathered insects and things with her father and examine them under a microscope. He would also take her on outdoors trips to further her interest in the sciences. After high school, she completed an undergraduate degree in zoology at Swarthmore College. During summer breaks from Swarthmore, she worked in a high-altitude biology research lab in Crested Butte, Colorado studying the nitrogen conserving abilities of different animals. She originally planned to study physiology in graduate school but thought that a medical degree would provide her with more career options.

== Higher education ==
In 1970, Allen enrolled at the University of California San Diego to become a Doctor of Medicine. From the various medical schools she could have attended, she decided upon UCSD because it was a brand new program that recruited professors from all over the country. While in medical school, Allen worked in the vascular surgeon Dr. Kaj Johansen's lab who was researching the implantation of experimental hearts into cows. This was her first experience with cardiothoracic surgery.

After graduating from medical school, Allen completed a five-year residency in general surgery at Oakland Medical Center (then the Kaiser Foundation Hospital) and a two-year residency in cardiothoracic surgery at King's College Hospital in London. While finishing her time in London, she was selected to complete a five-year residency program at Stanford University School of Medicine with Dr. Norman Shumway. Before doing so, Allen took a year to travel the world, spending six months in Papua New Guinea practicing in the hospital as a country-licensed physician. After her time in Papua New Guinea, she returned to the U.S. to undertake the residency in cardiac surgery at Stanford University School of Medicine in 1982. At Stanford, she trained under the tutelage of Norman Shumway, a pioneer in heart transplantation, and became the first woman in the world to transplant a heart. During her residency, Allen helped a neighbor graduate student with her linguistic project in which a gorilla taught her how to communicate in sign language. At the end of her residency in 1985, Allen joined the surgical faculty of the University of Washington.

== Career ==
She founded the University of Washington Medical Center's heart transplant program, which was the first of its kind in the Pacific Northwest region, and was its director until 1996. She was awarded "Woman of the Year" by the International Women's Forum in 1990 and was named one of the "Best Doctors in America" for five consecutive years beginning in 1992. In 1994, she was elected national president of the United Network for Organ Sharing (UNOS), the first woman to hold the position. As president, she conducted an organ allocation analysis, reduced the time waiting for transplants, and increased awareness of organ donation in minority communities. In 1995, she shared the computerized technology of matching donated organs for transplant patients in Smithsonian Institution Computerworld Award in Medicine. In 1996, the chief of surgery at UW removed Allen as transplant director. Allen was appointed professor in the Division of Cardiothoracic Surgery at the University of Washington in 1998. In 2000, however, she settled a sex-discrimination suit with the university after having worked there for 25 years. She received a settlement of $750,000 US dollars but was forced to resign from the cardiac transplant program and cease all of her research that had ties to the University of Washington. She was the medical director of the Hope Heart Institute, a public health charity, where she was involved in several programs to promote heart disease prevention. State Representative Jim McDermott nominated Allen as a Local Legend in 2003. In 2004, the institute merged with the Benaroya Research Institute, where she became a member of the Hope Heart Matrix Biology Program.
