= Sheraton Grand =

Sheraton Grand may refer to:

- Sheraton Grand Seattle, High-rise hotel in Seattle, in the U.S. state of Washington
- Sheraton Grand Kraków, 5 stars hotel in Kraków, Poland
- Sheraton Grand London Park Lane Hotel, 5-star hotel on Piccadilly, London
- Sheraton Grand Taipei Hotel, Hotel located in Zhongzheng District, Taipei, Taiwan.
- Sheraton Grand Incheon Hotel, Hotel in South Korea
- Sheraton Grand Doha Resort & Convention Hotel, Five-star luxury hotel run by the Sheraton Hotels and Resorts in Doha, Qatar
- Sheraton Grand Tel Aviv Hotel, Hotel on Hayarkon Street in Tel Aviv, Israel.
- Sheraton Grand Mirage Resort, Port Douglas, Seaside resort hotel in Queensland, Australia.
- Sheraton Grand Tbilisi Metechi Palace, Five-star hotel in Tbilisi, the capital of Georgia.
- Sheraton Grand Rio Hotel & Resort, Hotel in Rio de Janeiro, Brazil
