= Manning's Cafeterias =

American restaurant chain

- Industry: Restaurants
- Number of locations: 40
- Area served: United States

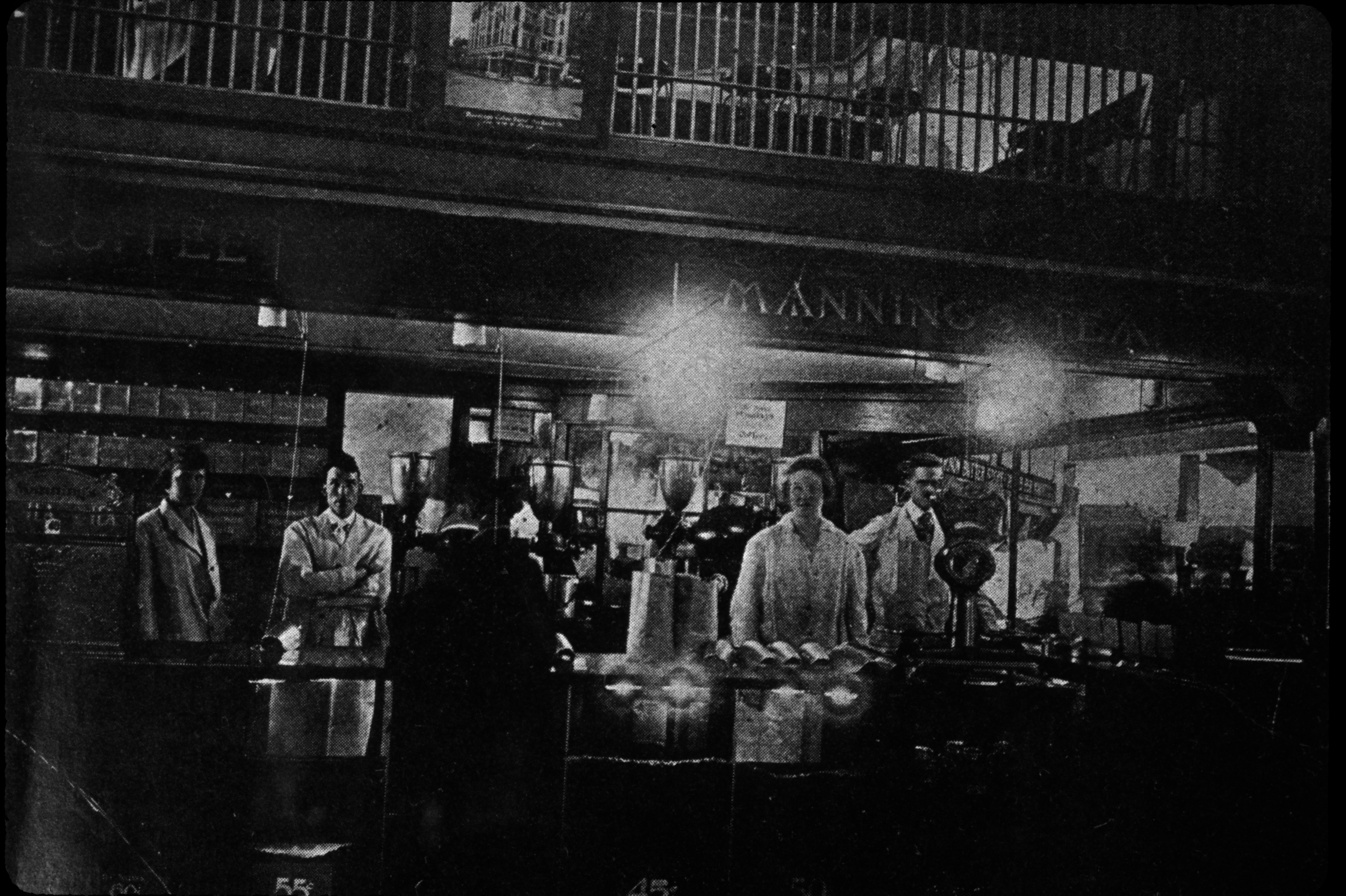
The original Manning's in Pike Place Market, circa 1930s.

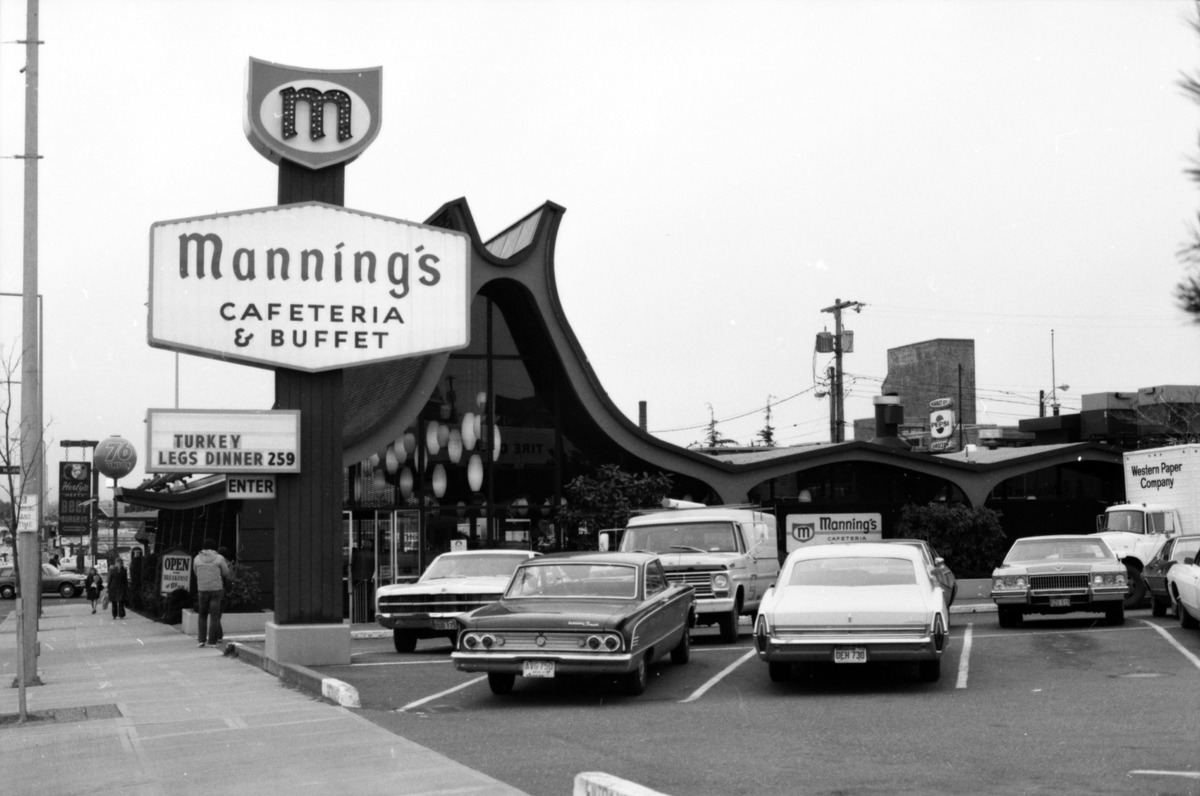
This building at the corner of NW Market St. and 15th Ave NW, Ballard, Seattle, Washington, was originally (1964) Manning's Cafeteria, and then (1984) became a Denny's chain restaurant. It was shuttered when the location was supposed to be used for a station for a monorail that was never built. The building was granted city landmark status February 20, 2008, but that was later reversed and the building was demolished.

Manning's Cafeterias was a chain of about 40 cafeteria-style restaurants in nine western U.S. states. The chain started in Seattle's Pike Place Market in 1908; that location became Lowell's in 1957 and is still in operation. Another one in Ballard, a district of Seattle, was constructed in 1964 in the futuristic Googie architectural style (of which the Seattle Space Needle is a famous example), reopened as a Denny's in 1984 and was designated a City of Seattle Landmark by the Landmarks Preservation Board on February 20, 2008.

When the Ballard Manning's opened in November 1964, a Seattle Times article appeared with the title: "Manning’s New Restaurant Called ‘Taj Mahal of Ballard.’" The new restaurant had an unconventional and distinctive appearance prompting the article’s writer to state: "The newest addition to the firm is the new Manning’s restaurant in Ballard. Sometimes referred to as the ‘Taj Mahal of Ballard,’ because of its delightful and colorful architecture...." Other articles described it as a "longhouse," referring to its resemblance to a particular type of Old Norse dwelling. This flamboyant mix of sources was calculated to attract attention. The building was declared a Seattle Historical Landmark by the Landmarks Preservation Board in February, 2008. The status was appealed by the owner, Benaroya Companies, who wanted to demolish the historic structure. Just three months after it was declared an Historic Landmark, the Landmarks Preservations Board reversed it decision, the City of Seattle issued a demolition permit, and the building was demolished on June 24, 2008.
