= Juvenation =

Juvenation is a social network especially for people with type 1 diabetes and their caregivers which was created by the Juvenile Diabetes Research Foundation (JDRF) through an unrestricted educational grant from Novo Nordisk. According to JDRF, the goal of Juvenation is to facilitate a network of ongoing peer-to-peer support.

Once a person registers with Juvenation, he/she can create a profile, participate in online discussion groups and forums, create and comment on blogs, upload videos, and more. Members share their thoughts, concerns and tips about living with diabetes. There is also information about new gadgets and technologies to treat type 1 diabetes.

JDRF launched Juvenation on World Diabetes Day, November 14, 2008. As of this writing, the site has more than 14,000 members.
