= Jack Benaroya =

American real estate developer and philanthropist (1921–2012)

Jack A. Benaroya
- Born: July 11, 1921; Montgomery, Alabama
- Died: May 11, 2012 (aged 90)
- Occupation: Founder of the Benaroya Company
- Spouse: Rebecca Benaroya
- Children: Donna Benaroya; Alan Benaroya; Larry Benaroya

Jack A. Benaroya (July 11, 1921 – May 11, 2012) was an American real estate developer and philanthropist who built what became the Pacific Northwest’s largest privately held commercial real-estate empire which he sold in 1984 for $315 million.

After selling his company, he became a venture capitalist and was an early investor in Starbucks. He was noted for his philanthropy and prominent civic leadership in Seattle, Washington.

== Biography ==
Benaroya was born to Lebanese Jewish immigrants in Montgomery, Alabama but spent his childhood in California before moving to Seattle at the age of 12. Benaroya attended Seattle's Garfield High School. After graduating, he took a job at his family's beer distributorship and then went on to serve with the United States Navy in the Philippines during World War II.

Upon his return, he became involved in real estate by building post offices in the region which was experiencing a post-war boom; however, his fortune was earned by building industrial parks, a concept not yet seen in the northwestern United States.

In 1956, Benaroya established the Benaroya Company which would become the largest commercial real estate developer in the state of Washington. In 1984, he sold his real estate portfolio for $315 million shifting the focus of the company to venture capital. Benaroya was also an early investor in Starbucks.

== Philanthropy ==
Benaroya was a former director of the Seattle Chamber of Commerce; the United Way of King County; Temple de Hirsch Sinai; Congregation Ezra Bessaroth; the Stroum Jewish Community Center; and the Pilchuck Glass School. He was a supporter of the Juvenile Diabetes Foundation International (JDRF); the University of Washington Medical Center; Children's Hospital and Medical Center; Lakeside School; and the Jewish Federation and Council of Seattle.

Benaroya was the most significant donor who funded the construction of Benaroya Hall, the venue at which the Seattle Symphony performs, which opened in 1998; and the Benaroya Research Institute at Virginia Mason Medical Center in Seattle, which opened in 1999.

An endowned chair in Israel Studies had been created in his and his wife’s name at the University of Washington, Seattle. In February 2022, it was reported that the endownment was pulled back after the holder of the endowned chair, Prof. Liora Halperin made statements that the Benaroya family disagreed with. UW returning the donation was widely criticized as a dangerous precedent for donor intervention in academia.

== Personal life and death ==
Benaroya was married to his wife Rebecca for over seventy years. They had three children: Donna Benaroya, Alan Benaroya, and Larry Benaroya. In the years before his death, Benaroya was slowed by Parkinson's disease. He died on May 11, 2012. A memorial service led by Gerard Schwarz and the Seattle Symphony was held on May 14 at Benaroya Hall.

== See also ==
- Manning's Cafeterias

== Notes ==
- Forbes, 27 October 1986.
- Seattle KingCounty Realtors: 1st Citizen Award Recipients
- Seattle Times Article, May 11, 2012: Philanthropist and developer Jack Benaroya has died
