= Socialist Workers' Federation =

Socialist organisation in the Salonica Vilayet, Ottoman Empire

Socialist Workers' Federation Fédération socialiste ouvrière de Salonique פ'ידיראסייון סוסייאליסטה לאב'וראדירה Социалистическа работническа федерация Σοσιαλιστική Εργατική Ομοσπονδία Θεσσαλονίκης Selanik Sosyalist İşçi Federasyonu
- Leader: Avraam Benaroya
- Founded: 24 July 1909
- Dissolved: 17 November 1918
- Merged into: Socialist Workers' Party of Greece
- Headquarters: Salonica
- Newspaper: Solidaridad Ovradera
- Ideology: Socialism; Austromarxism; Federalism; Pacifism; Secularism; Antizionism
- Political position: Left-wing
- International affiliation: Second International

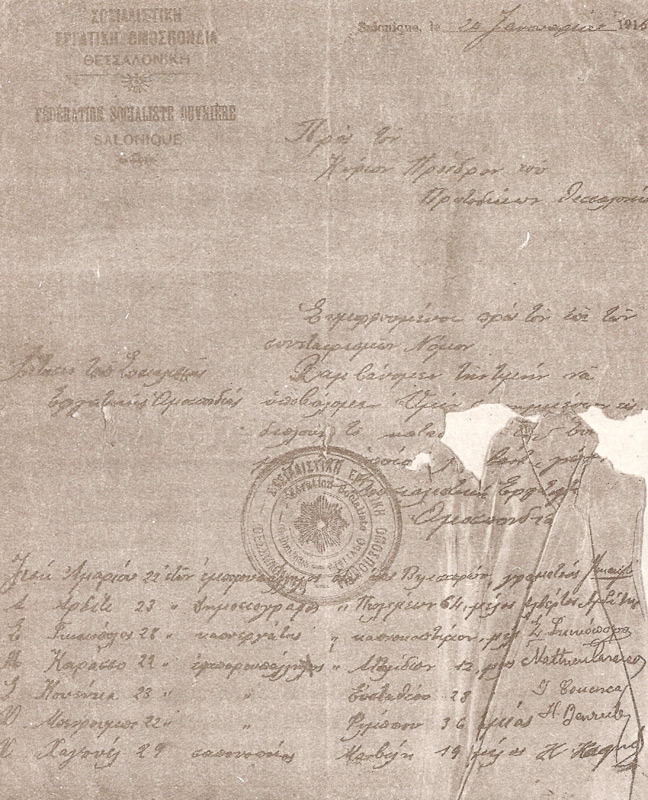
Socialist Workers' Federation (Φεντερασιόν in Greek). The official application with which the part is asking from the Greek court authority for recognition in 1916.

The Socialist Workers' Federation (Greek: Σοσιαλιστική Εργατική Ομοσπονδία, romanized: Sosialistikí Ergatikí Omospondía; French: Fédération Socialiste Ouvrière; Ladino: פ'ידיראסייון סוסייאליסטה לאב'וראדירה, romanized: Federasion Sosialista Lavoradera; Turkish: Selanik Sosyalist İşçi Federasyonu) was a socialist organisation in the Salonica Vilayet of the Ottoman Empire (present-day Thessaloniki), led by Avraam Benaroya. It was an attempt at union of different nationalities' workers in Salonica within a single labor movement.

== The Federation in the Ottoman Empire ==
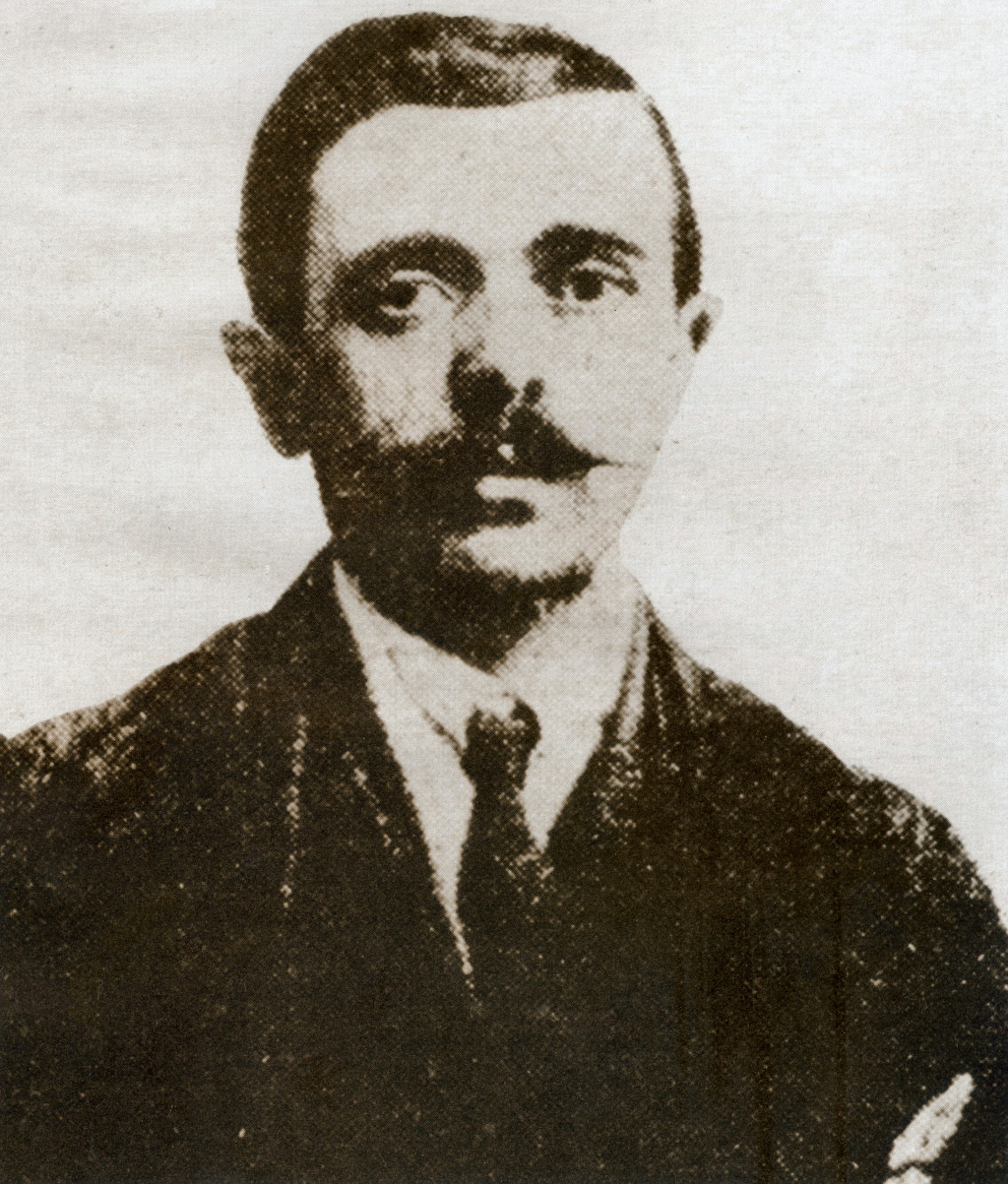
Avraam Benaroya

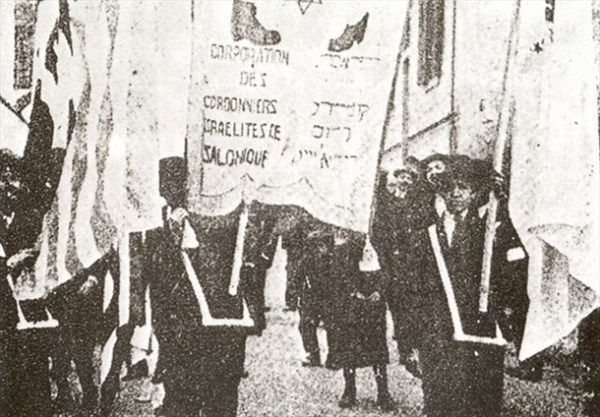
Jewish workers march, 1908 - 1909

Idealistic and pragmatist at the same time, Avraam Benaroya, a Jew from Bulgaria, played a leading role in the creation of the mainly Jewish Fédération Socialiste Ouvrière in Thessaloniki, in May–June 1909. His main associates were militant Sephardic Jews, Alberto Arditti, David Recanati and Joseph Hazan, as well as Bulgarians like Angel Tomov and Dimitar Vlahov.

The organization took this name because, built on the federative model of the Social Democratic Party of Austria, it was conceived as a federation of separate sections, each representing the four main ethnic groups of the city: Jews, Bulgarians, Greeks and Turks. It initially published its literature in the languages of these four groups (i.e. Ladino, Bulgarian, Greek and Turkish, respectively) but in practice the two latter sections were under-represented if not nonexistent. The publication's title was Journal del Labourador (Ladino) - Amele Gazetesi (Ottoman Turkish).

The democratic Fédération soon became, under Benaroya's leadership, the strongest socialist party in the Ottoman Empire, while the "Ottoman Socialist Party" was essentially an intellectual club, and the other socialist parties were at the same time national parties, like the Istanbul Greek Socialist Center, the Social Democrat Hunchakian Party or the Armenian Revolutionary Federation. It created combative trade unions, attracted important intellectuals and gained a solid base of support among Macedonian workers. By 1910, the Fédération comprised fourteen syndicates, and in 1912 it mobilized about 12,000 workers in various demonstrations. From 1910 to 1911 Benaroya edited its influential newspaper, the Solidaridad Ovradera, printed in Ladino. Fédération cultivated strong links with the Second International and had its own representative, Saul Nahum, in the International Socialist Bureau.

Unlike other parties which were organised on ethnic lines, as a cross-community group the Fédération was tolerated by the Ottoman authorities. A prominent Bulgarian member, Dimitar Vlahov, was a socialist MP in the new Ottoman parliament, which was dominated by the Committee of Union and Progress (CUP) party until 1912. Indeed, its leaders initially supported the Young Turks, and Benaroya participated in the "Action Army" march on Istanbul to help put down the Countercoup of 1909. Alarmed by the growing power of socialist groups, the CUP subsequently launched a crackdown, during which Benaroya was jailed.

In their reference book over the Balkan Jews, Esther Benbassa and Aron Rodrigue show that the internationalist socialists of the Fédération defended the Ladino language against the Zionists, favouring Hebrew, and the Alliance Israélite Universelle, who favoured French, thus remaining in some way close to the traditional Jewish world, they represented a form of westernization without assimilation.

== The Federation and the labour movement in Greece ==
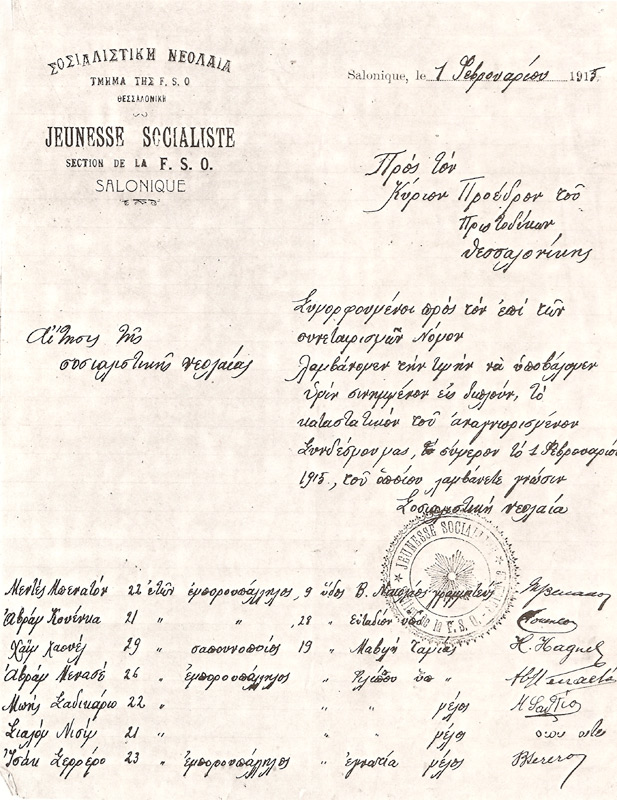
Socialist Workers' Federation (Φεντερασιόν in Greek). The official application with which the party is asking for recognition of the socialist youth in 1915.

In the aftermath of the incorporation of Thessaloniki into the Greek state during the Balkan Wars, Benaroya resisted the attempts to impose ethnic divisions in the city. Opposed to the First World War, Benaroya and another Jewish socialist were exiled for two and a half years at the island of Naxos. In contrast to most of the prominent socialists in the pre-1913 Greece who followed Eleftherios Venizelos, Benaroya and the Fédération, adhering to its internationalist ideals, mobilized for neutrality. As this happened to be the same policy pursued by King Constantine I of Greece and his militaristic entourage (see National Schism), it led to the loss of support for the Fédération in Macedonia. After the departure of its Slavic element, the Fédération was numerically dominated by Jews.

From 1915 onwards the Fédération was buoyed by the popular reaction to the war. Both monarchist and Venizelist policy actually assisted the emancipation and the radicalization of the left, and Benaroya, keeping equal distance from both established political groups, was quick to turn the situation to advantage. In the May 1915 general elections the Fédération sent two deputies representing Thessaloniki to the Greek Parliament, while it lost by only a few votes for a third seat. It already had strong links with internationalist groups and organizations all over Greece and abroad; from them the Socialist Workers' Party was to spring up in due time. However, another socialist faction, headed by the future Prime Minister Alexandros Papanastasiou, who sided with Venizelos in foreign affairs, also had deputies elected in the same election.

Papanastasiou and other reform-minded socialists strongly supported Venizelos' liberal brand of nationalism. Benaroya and the Fédération, on the other hand, were influenced by Austromarxists such as Victor Adler, Otto Bauer and Karl Renner, who, sensitive to matters national, searched ways to utilize socialism as a cohesive force for the decrepit Habsburg monarchy; they elaborated the principle of personal autonomy, according to which national consciousness should be depoliticized and become a personal matter. Modern states should be based on free association and allow self-definition and self-organization of ethnicities in cultural affairs, while a mixed parliament, proportionally representing all nations of the realm, should decide on economic and political questions. The Fédération traced the origins of its federative position in Balkan authors of the Enlightenment like Rigas Velestinlis, and stressed that the forthcoming peace should exclude any change of borders or transfer of populations. The Socialist Labour Party of Greece (later renamed as Communist Party of Greece, KKE), created by Benaroya's initiative near the end of the First World War, followed closely the Fédération's theses on national self-determination, and wanted to transform the Greek state into a federation of autonomous provinces that would safeguard the rights of minorities and participate in a federative Republic of the Balkan peoples.

== Sources ==
- H. Şükrü Ilicak (September 2002). "Jewish Socialism in Ottoman Salonica". Southeast European and Black Sea Studies. 2 (3): 115–146. ISSN 1468-3857
- Iakovos J. Aktsoglou, The emergence / development of social and working class movement in the city of Thessaloniki (working associations and labor unions), “Balkan Studies”, Thessaloniki, Vol. 38, No. 2, 1997, pp. 285–306.
- Joshua Starr, The Socialist Federation of Saloniki, Jewish Social Studies, Vol. 7, No. 4 (Oct. 1945), pp. 323-336
- Abraham Benaroya, A Note on "The Socialist Federation of Saloniki", Jewish Social Studies, Vol. 11, No. 1 (Jan. 1949), pp. 69-72
- Nicole Cohen-Rak, La "Solidaridad ovradera", journal socialiste judéo-espagnol de Salonique, 1911: édition de 7 numéros, traductions, index divers, considérations linguistiques, Vol. 1 and 2, Université de Paris III, 1986.
