= Benaroya Hall =

Home of the Seattle symphony

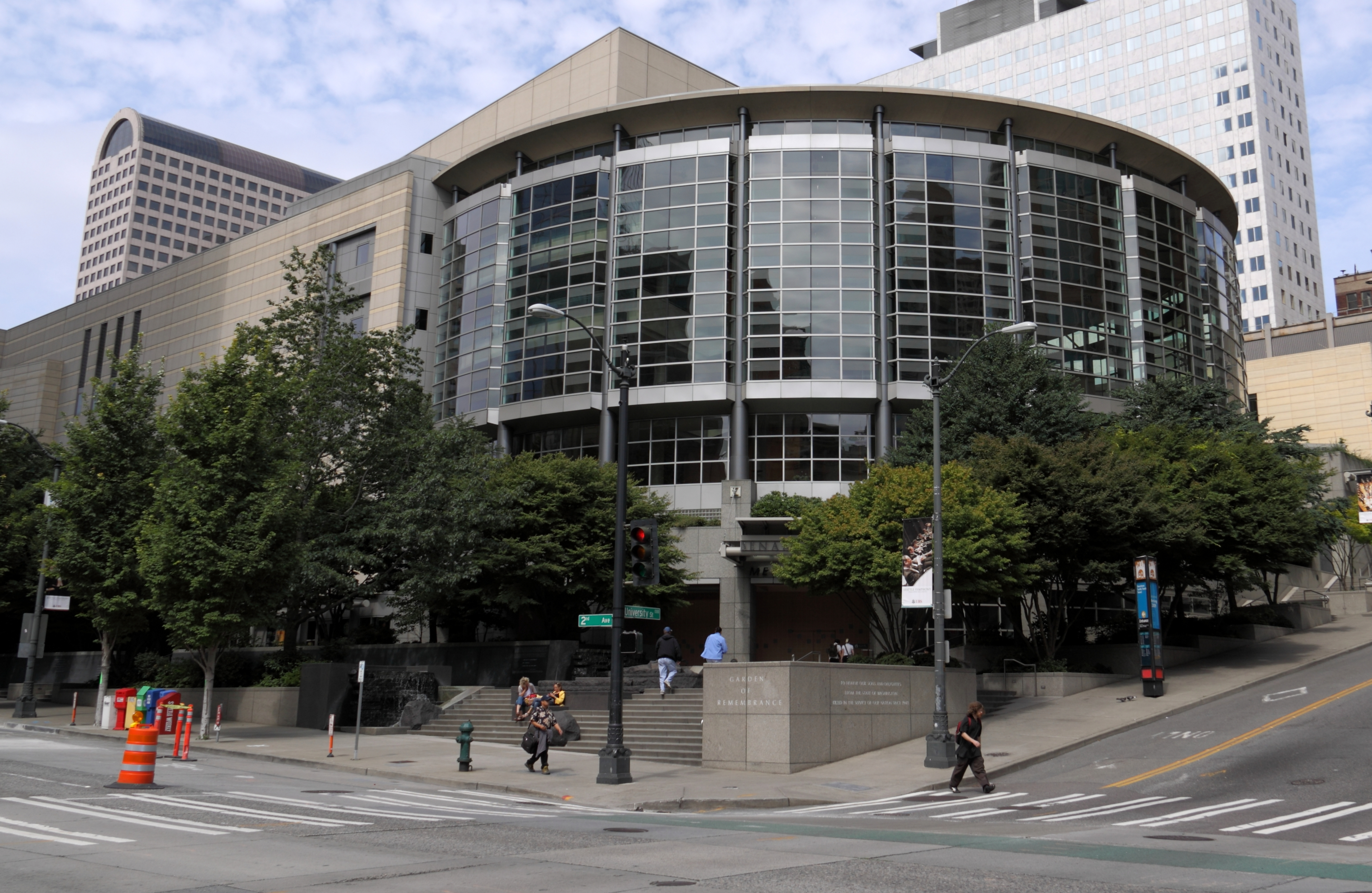
- Interactive map of Benaroya Hall
- Address: 200 University Street; Seattle, Washington; United States
- Coordinates: 47.608051°N 122.336948°W
- Capacity: Taper: 2,500; Nordstrom: 536
- Type: Concert hall

Construction
- Opened: September 1998
- Architect: LMN Architects

Website
- www.seattlesymphony.org/benaroyahall

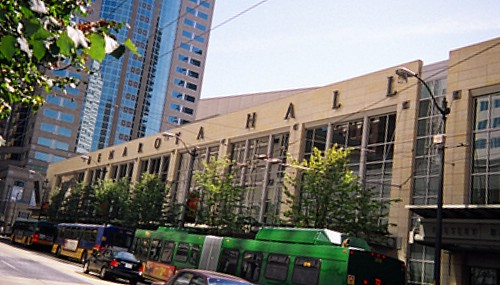
3rd Avenue side of Benaroya Hall

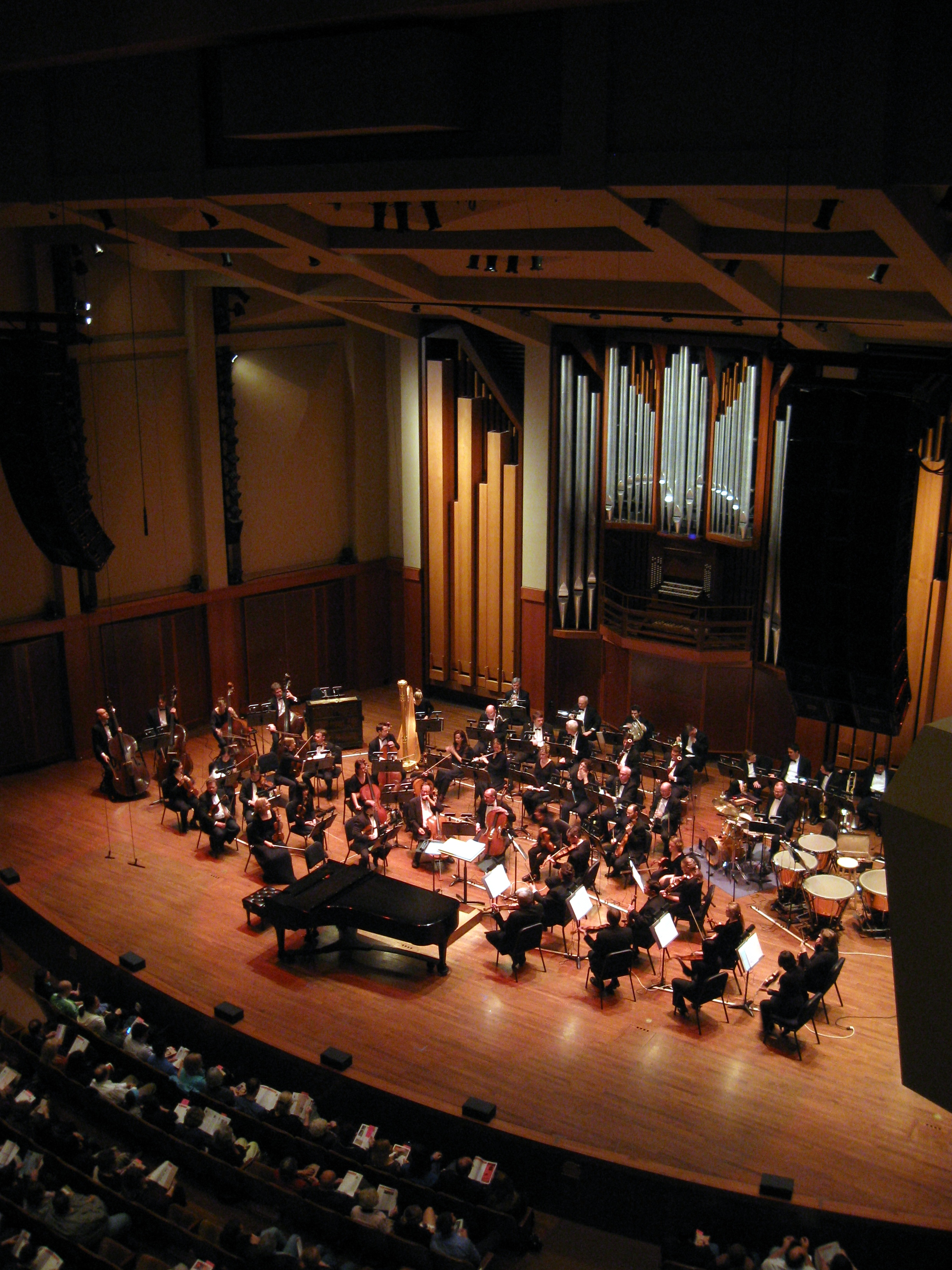
Seattle Symphony on stage in Benaroya Hall in May 2009

Benaroya Hall is the home of the Seattle Symphony in Downtown Seattle, Washington, United States. It features two auditoria, the S. Mark Taper Foundation Auditorium, a 2,500-seat performance venue, as well as the Illsley Ball Nordstrom Recital Hall, which seats 536. Opened in September 1998 at a cost of $120 million, Benaroya is noted for its technology-infused acoustics designed by Cyril Harris. Benaroya occupies an entire city block in the center of the city and has helped double the Seattle Symphony's budget and number of performances. The lobby of the hall features a large contribution of glass art, such as one given the title Crystal Cascade, by artist Dale Chihuly.

Since 2007, Benaroya Hall has hosted regular collaborations between the Seattle Symphony and popular music artists as part of its pops program. Performers have included notable local and national acts such as Brandi Carlile, Macklemore, Sir Mix-A-Lot, Nancy Wilson, Thunderpussy, and SYML. These concerts combine popular music with symphonic arrangements and aim to broaden the hall’s and the orchestra’s audience. Nonclassical performances, including pop collaborations, live film scores, and video game music, account for approximately 30% of the Symphony’s revenue and often attract new listeners to classical programming.

In April 2025, Japanese pianist Nobuyuki Tsujii performed three sold-out concerts at Benaroya Hall, featuring Rachmaninoff’s Piano Concerto No. 3 and receiving multiple standing ovations. It was Tsujii’s third appearance in Seattle, following earlier performances in 2013 and 2023.

Benaroya Hall is named for noted philanthropist Jack Benaroya, whose $15.8 million donation was the first and largest of many for construction of the facility.

The hall was designed by LMN Architects of Seattle, and was awarded the National Honor Award from the American Institute of Architects in 2001. The structural engineer on the project was Magnusson Klemencic Associates.

The building sits directly above the Great Northern Tunnel, which carries the primary rail corridor through the city, and adjacent to the Downtown Seattle Transit Tunnel. The latter has Symphony station, which is directly integrated into the building and was renamed in August 2024 for the Seattle Symphony. The performance hall is insulated by floating on rubber pads which insulate it from the outer shell of the building. These same noise-insulation features would also serve to dampen the destructive effects of any prospective earthquakes.

== See also ==
- List of concert halls
