= Sheraton Grand Seattle =

Hotel in Seattle, Washington, U.S.

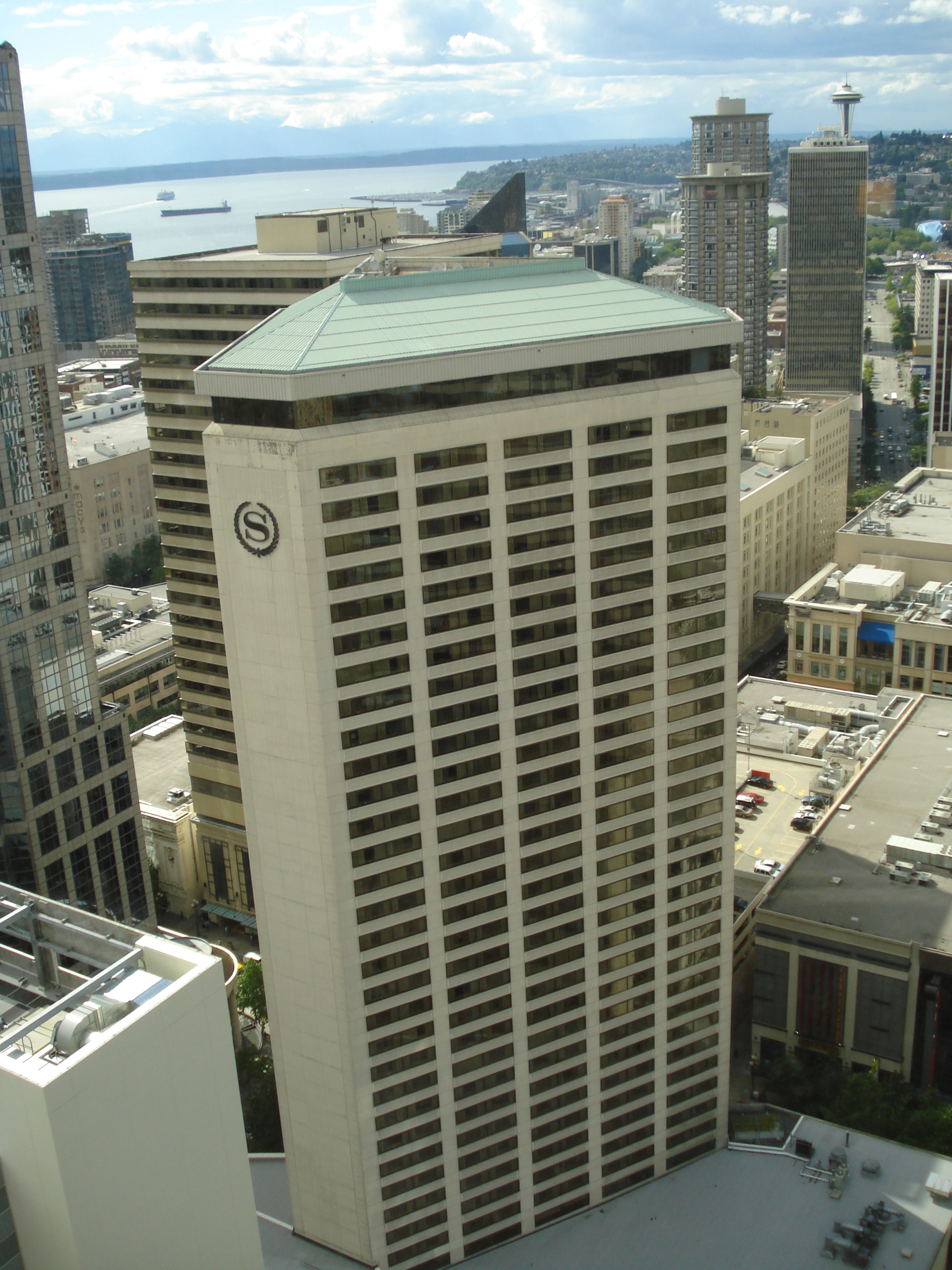
- The hotel's exterior, 2007
- Interactive map of the Sheraton Grand Seattle area

General information
- Coordinates: 47°36′40″N 122°20′2″W

Sheraton Grand Seattle is a high-rise hotel in Seattle, in the U.S. state of Washington. The hotel is operated by Sheraton Hotels and Resorts, which is owned by Marriott International. The 35-floor building was built in 1982 and renovated in 2011.

The hotel is among the largest in Seattle, with 1,236 guest rooms as of 2020. Sheraton Grand Seatltle unveiled a $60 million renovation, which included a Starbucks shop, in 2018. The hotel hosts a Gingerbread Village annually to raise funds for JDRF (Juvenile Diabetes Research Foundation). The restaurant Loulay Kitchen and Bar has operated in the building.
