= Avraam Benaroya =

Ottoman and later Greek Jewish socialist

Avraam Eliezer Benaroya
- אברהם בן-ארויה
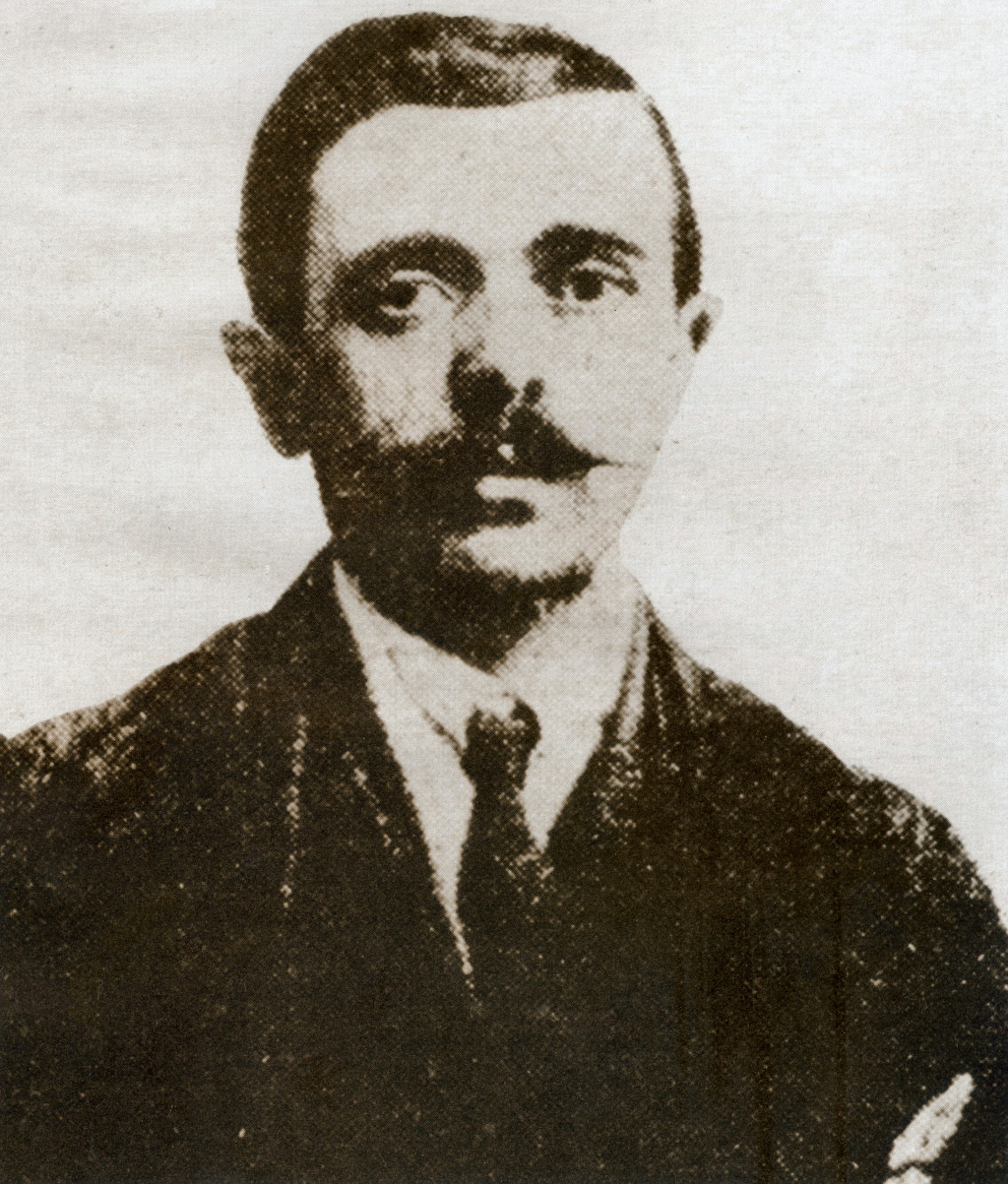
- Born: 1887; Vidin, Principality of Bulgaria
- Died: 16 May 1979 (aged 91–92); Holon, or Jaffa, Israel
- Movement: Socialist

Avraam Eliezer Benaroya (Hebrew: אברהם בן-ארויה; Bulgarian: Аврам Бенароя; Greek: Αβραάμ Μπεναρόγια; Ladino: Abrahán Eliezer Benarroya; Turkish: Avram Benaroya; 1887 – 16 May 1979) was a Jewish socialist, member of the Bulgarian Social Democratic Workers' Party (Narrow Socialists), later leader of the Socialist Workers' Federation in the Ottoman Empire. Benaroya played a key role in the foundation of the Socialist Workers' Party of Greece in 1918, the predecessor of the Communist Party of Greece.

== Early years ==
Benaroya was born to a Sephardi Jew in Bulgaria. He was raised in Vidin by a family of small merchants. A polyglot, Benaroya learned to speak six languages fluently. He studied at the University of Belgrade Faculty of Law, but did not graduate, becoming rather a teacher in Plovdiv. Here Benaroya became a member of the Bulgarian Social Democratic Workers' Party (Narrow Socialists) (although other sources suggest that he joined the Bulgarian Social Democratic Workers' Party (Broad Socialists), he himself insisted that this was incorrect) and published in Bulgarian his work The Jewish Question and Social Democracy (1908).

After the Young Turk revolution of 1908 he moved as a socialist organizer to Thessaloniki. He founded here a group called Sephardic Circle of Socialist Studies and was in connection to the Bulgarian left-wing faction, close to the Internal Macedonian Revolutionary Organization (IMRO), called People's Federative Party (Bulgarian Section), as well as to some Bulgarian socialists, who worked there. Benaroya's influence grew, as he argued that any socialist movement in the city must take the form of a federation in which all national groups could participate. Due to the Bulgarian roots of its Jewish founder, the organization was viewed with suspicion by the Young Turks and later by the Greek government, as being close to the IMRO and Bulgarian socialist movement.

== The Fédération Socialiste Ouvrière ==
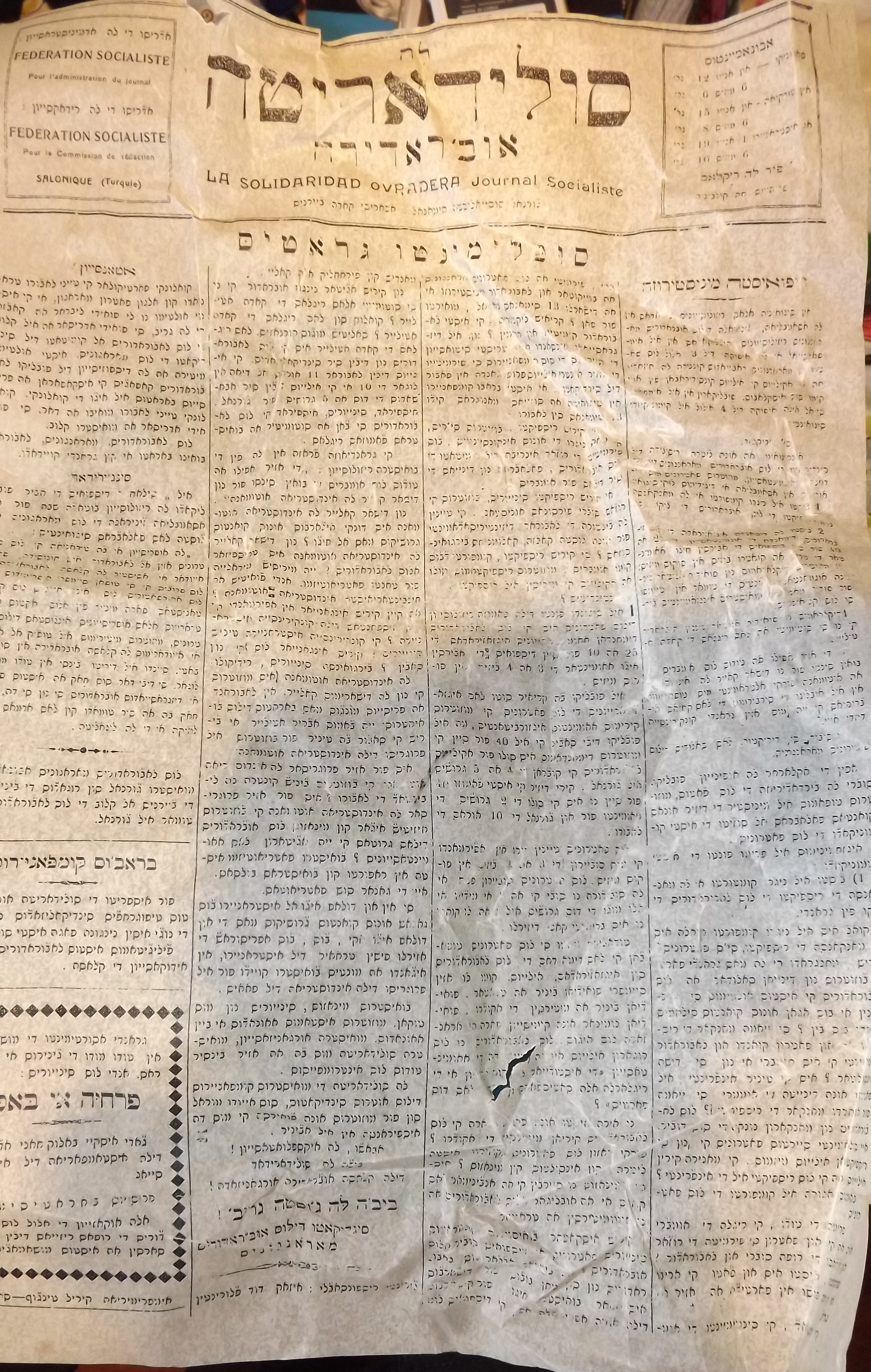
Solidaridad Obradera

Idealistic and pragmatic at the same time, in Thessaloniki Benaroya played a leading role in the creation, in 1909, of the mainly Jewish Socialist Workers' Federation, or in Ladino, Federacion. The organization took this name because, built on the federative model of the Social Democratic Party of Austria, it was conceived as a federation of separate sections, each representing the four main ethnic groups of the city: Jews, Bulgarians, Greeks and Turks. It published its literature in the languages of these four groups (i.e., Ladino, Bulgarian, Greek and Turkish, respectively) but in practice the two latter sections were under-represented if not nonexistent. The democratic Federacion soon became, under Benaroya's leadership, the strongest socialist party in the Ottoman Empire. It created combative trade unions, attracted important intellectuals and gained a solid base of support among Macedonian workers while cultivating strong links with the Second International. From 1910 to 1911 Benaroya edited its influential newspaper, the Solidaridad Ovradera, printed in Ladino.

Unlike other parties which were organised on ethnic lines, as a cross-community group the Federacion was allowed by the Ottoman authorities. A prominent Bulgarian member, Dimitar Vlahov, was a socialist MP in the new Ottoman parliament until 1912. Indeed, its leaders initially supported the Young Turks, and Benaroya participated in the "Army of Freedom" march on Istanbul to help put down the Countercoup of 1909. Alarmed by the growing power of socialist groups, the CUP subsequently launched a crack down, under which Benaroya was jailed three times, in early November 1910, June 1911 (when he was deported to Serbia) and February 1912 (when he was deported to Greece).

== The Federacion and the labour movement in Greece ==
In the aftermath of the incorporation of Thessaloniki into the Greek state, Benaroya resisted the attempts to impose ethnic divisions in the city. Opposed to the First World War, Benaroya and another Jewish socialist were exiled for two and a half years at the island of Naxos. In contrast to most of the prominent socialists in the pre-1913 Greece who followed Eleftherios Venizelos, Benaroya and the Federacion, adhering to its internationalist ideals, mobilized for neutrality. As this happened to the same policy as pursued by King Constantine and his militaristic entourage, this led to the loss of support for Federacion in Macedonia.

From 1915 onwards the Federacion was buoyed by the popular reaction to the war. Both monarchist and Venizelist policy actually assisted the emancipation and the radicalization of the left, and Benaroya, keeping equal distance from both established political groups, was quick to turn the situation to advantage. In the 1915 general elections Federacion sent two deputies representing Thessaloniki (Aristotelis Sideris and Alberto Couriel) to the Greek Parliament, while it lost by only a few votes for a third seat. It already had strong links with internationalist groups and organizations all over Greece and abroad; from them the Socialist Workers Party was to spring up in due time. However, another socialist faction, headed by the future Prime Minister Alexandros Papanastasiou, who sided with Venizelos in foreign affairs, also had deputies elected in the same election.

Papanastasiou and other reform-minded socialists strongly supported Venizelos' liberal brand of nationalism. Benaroya and the Federacion, on the other hand, were influenced by Austromarxists such as Victor Adler, Otto Bauer and Karl Renner, who, sensitive to matters national, searched ways to utilize socialism as a cohesive force for the decrepit Habsburg monarchy; they elaborated the principle of personal autonomy, according to which national consciousness should be depoliticized and become a personal matter. Modern states should be based on free association and allow self-definition and self-organization of ethnicities in cultural affairs, while a mixed parliament, proportionally representing all nations of the realm, should decide on economic and political questions. The Federacion traced the origins of its federative position in Balkan authors of the Enlightenment like Rigas Velestinlis, and stressed that the forthcoming peace should exclude any change of borders or transfer of populations. The Socialist Workers' Party, that was created under Benaroya's initiative near the end of the First World War, followed closely the Federacion's theses on national self-determination, and wanted to transform the Greek state into a federation of autonomous provinces that would safeguard the rights of minorities and participate in a federative Republic of the Balkan peoples.

== Jewish ethnic activism ==
Benaroya was interested in the Jewish Question since the beginning of his career and made efforts to promote Jewish causes throughout it. His first book was The Jewish Question and Social Democracy (1908) while once in Thessaloniki he founded a group called the Sephardic Circle of Socialist Studies. He also played a leading role in the creation, in 1909, of the mainly Jewish Federacion. Apprehensive of what the resurgent Greek self-confidence behind the Megali Idea might mean for Jews in Greece and Asia Minor, at the time he labelled the campaign imperialist. He envisaged a state free from any ethnic divisions where Jews could exist unpersecuted and free, retaining their religion. Some of his fears might have been argued to have been realised when after the city's fire, the Venizelos administration did not rebuild the original Jewish section, adopting instead a French town plan, but a considerable proportion of the Jewish population remained throughout the following decades, with the Greek government guaranteeing their rights in March 1926. Benaroya was always very interested in combating anti-Semitism, while over later years he shifted his emphasis to reflect the sizable Thessaloniki Jewish community that chose to remain within the Greek state.

== Partnership with Democratic Union ==
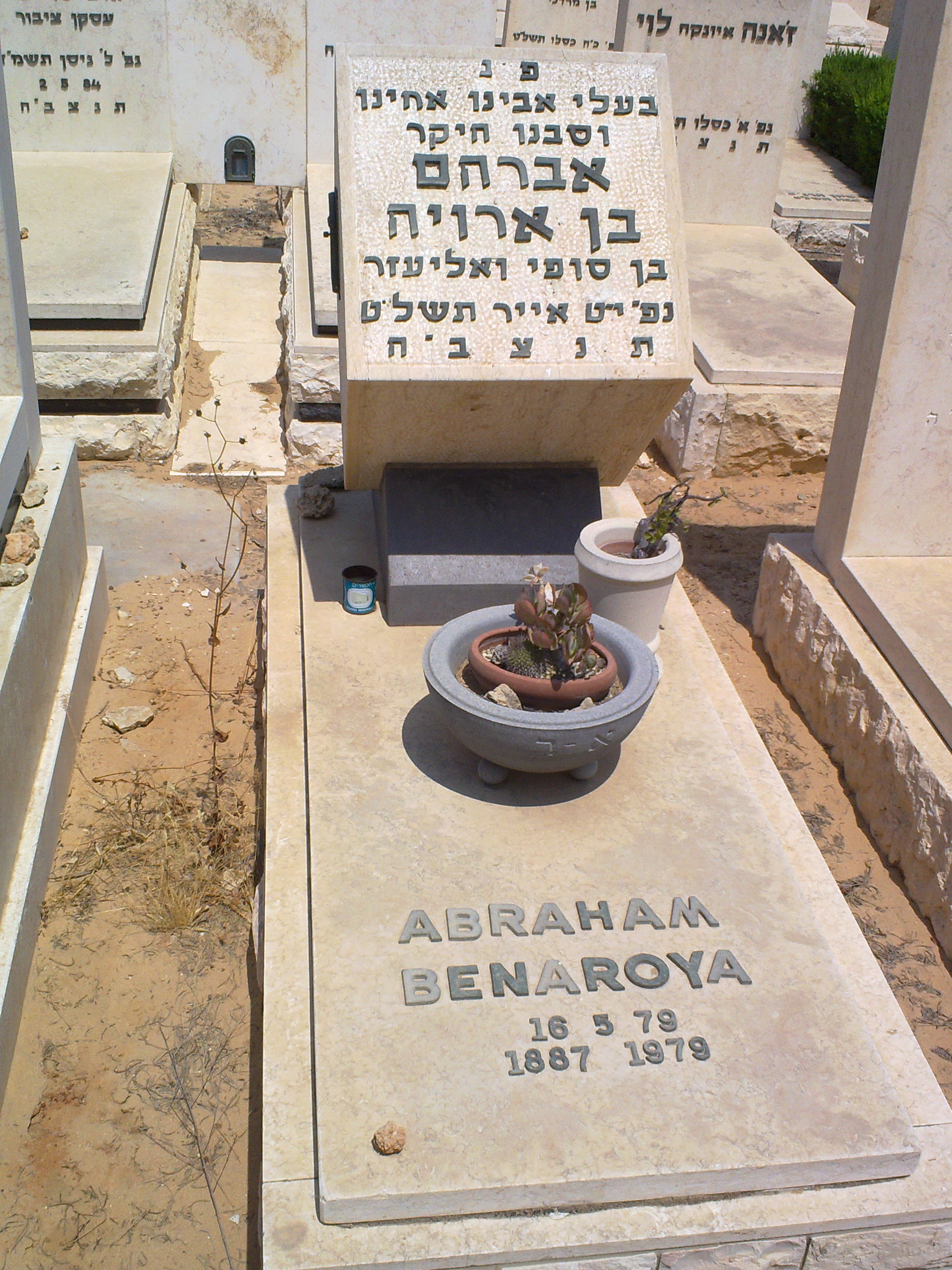
The tomb of Benaroya in the cemetery of Holon

After a historic meeting with Venizelos, Benaroya's tactical abilities resulted in the birth of the Socialist Workers' Party of Greece (later named the Communist Party of Greece) and the General Confederation of Greek Workers, which helped unite Greek workers.

Government persecution of the new movement led to a general strike in 1919. Subsequently, social and political polarization, as well as the prestige of the newborn Soviet Union, strengthened the radicals and before long the party was affiliated to the Leninist Third International. The Labour Centre of Salonica, another creation of Benaroya's, which united more than twelve thousand workers of all nationalities, a good part of them Jews, became the focus of radical socialism. The fall of the Venizelos government (1920) and the war in Anatolia fuelled even more dissent, leading to anti-war riots. In the wake of these developments Benaroya, thrown in prison again, as well as most of the leading members of the party, were marginalized by the radicals. On the other hand, moderate socialists under Alexandros Papanastasiou started preparing their own revolution: their primary aim was now to overthrow the Greek monarchy.

In 1922 the Greek army was defeated by the Kemalists and a military revolution ensued that deposed King Constantine. The new government undertook many reforms, notably the distribution of big estates to peasants, but after a general strike, workers were violently suppressed.

A little later, in December 1923, Benaroya, together with Couriel and Kordatos, who preferred social-democratic organizational models and opposed radical Bolshevisation considering the circumstances not suitable for a revolution, were expelled from the Communist Party of Greece and he was obliged to quit the editorship of Avanti. Afterwards, he focused his action on Thessaloniki's Jewish community, and participated in a splinter group that—with help from Papanastasiou, then Prime Minister—tried unsuccessfully to split the Communist Party. At that time, he and Papanastasiou agreed on the need for reforms and not revolution, and on the priority of abolishing the monarchy. An equally urgent imperative, though, was combating racism and anti-Semitism.

== Later life ==
Benaroya remained politically active after 1924, but as he stayed outside the principal political formations of the left, the communists and Papanastasiou's socialists, his capacity for action was increasingly restricted. In Thessaloniki, he had a difficult political life, especially after the Liberals' more nationalist turn by the end of the decade, and the repeated coups d'état of 1935 that destroyed the Republic and the hopes of the democratic left. In the 1940s he lost a son during the Greco-Italian war, he survived the Nazi concentration camps, and led a small socialist party in Greece after his return collaborating himself with Alexandros Svolos. He left to Israel in 1953, to Holon, where he ran a small convenience store. His attitude towards Zionism changed drastically during these years and he joined Mapai and became a supporter of David Ben-Gurion speaking on his behalf in political rallies for Ladino Speaking audience, and writing on its behalf on Ladino Israeli news papers. However his old age and lack of skills in Hebrew prevented him from pursuing a renewed political career. He died in 1979, aged ninety-two.
