= Breakthrough T1D =

Type 1 diabetes charity

- Founded: May 28, 1970; 56 years ago
- Founder: Lee Ducat, Carol Lurie
- Tax ID no.: 23-1907729
- Legal status: 501(c)(3) nonprofit organization
- Location: New York, New York, US
- Method: Research funding, Political advocacy, Education
- Revenue: $224 million (2023)
- Website: breakthrought1d.org
- Formerly called: Juvenile Diabetes Foundation (JDF) 1970–2012; Juvenile Diabetes Research Foundation (JDRF) 2012–2024

Breakthrough T1D (formerly JDRF) is a type 1 diabetes (T1D) research and advocacy organization.

Breakthrough T1D funds research for the development of new therapies and treatments for type 1 diabetes. The organization advocates for federal research funding toward new technologies and treatments and works with regulatory and policy officials to disburse funds. Breakthrough T1D also has partnerships with academia, industry, and clinicians to accelerate research into potential cures for T1D.

The organization has been described as "the leading global organization funding T1D research".

== History ==
Breakthrough T1D was founded in 1970 by a group of parents of children living with type 1 diabetes. It was originally named the Juvenile Diabetes Foundation. The founding members formed the organization with the intent to find a cure for type 1 diabetes and its complications by supporting research. It adopted what was at the time a novel organizational structure, where non-experts participated in developing research and advocacy policies.

The creation of international affiliates followed:

- Canada (1974)
- Australia (1981)
- Israel (1983)
- UK (1987)
- Netherlands (2010)

In 2012, JDF changed its name to Juvenile Diabetes Research Foundation, which was later shortened to JDRF.

In 2019, JDRF International appointed its first-ever CEO and president with type 1 diabetes, Dr. Aaron Kowalski.

In 2024, the international chapters of the organization began to change their name from JDRF to Breakthrough T1D, reflecting its focus on helping people of all ages and in line with growing awareness that T1D affects people of all ages. The Australian affiliate was the last to change their name on March 31, 2025.

== Purpose ==
Breakthrough T1D was founded to support and accelerate breakthroughs in medical science to cure, prevent, and treat type 1 diabetes and its complications. These goals are pursued both through scientific research and public advocacy campaigns.

== Research ==
Breakthrough T1D supports two main research objectives:

- Cure T1D by restoring the body’s ability to produce insulin and stopping T1D before it occurs or providing insulin independence through replacement with insulin-producing cells.
- Improve lives by minimizing the effects of T1D as much as possible until new T1D resources, technologies, and therapies are discovered.

Breakthrough T1D prioritizes four strategic research areas; autoimmune therapies, cell therapies, prevention of complications, and glucose control.

=== Research advances supported by Breakthrough T1D ===
==== Artificial Pancreas (AP) Systems ====
In 2006, Breakthrough T1D launched the Artificial Pancreas Consortium, allocating $6 million in grants to investigate the benefits of technology controlling blood-glucose levels to accelerate the availability of the artificial pancreas (AP). AP systems integrate three components—a CGM, an insulin pump, and an algorithm—to measure blood sugar, then calculate and administer, or withhold, insulin with minimal user input.

In 2016, the FDA approved the first hybrid closed-loop, or AP, system.

==== Continuous glucose monitors (CGM) ====
In 2008, Breakthrough T1D funded a clinical trial that demonstrated the efficacy of continuous glucose monitors (CGMs) in helping to manage blood sugar, with lower HbA1c levels and reduced rates of severe hypoglycemia. The research confirmed substantial benefits for T1D patients, leading to insurance coverage of CGMs and more widespread use.

==== Tzield ====
In the 1980s, Breakthrough T1D began funding basic research into disease-modifying therapies which can slow, halt, or reverse the progression of a disease. Breakthrough T1D continued research and strategic investments of this kind for decades.

In 2019, Breakthrough T1D, in partnership with the NIH, funded a clinical trial that led to the 2022 FDA approval of teplizumab (Tzield), the first disease-modifying therapy for T1D.

=== Funding and revenue ===
In 2023, Breakthrough T1D raised $224 million; of this, 78% went toward programs including research funding, 15% was spent on fundraising, and 7% was spent on administrative costs. Cumulatively, Breakthrough T1D was funding approximately $568 million in T1D research projects worldwide in 2018.

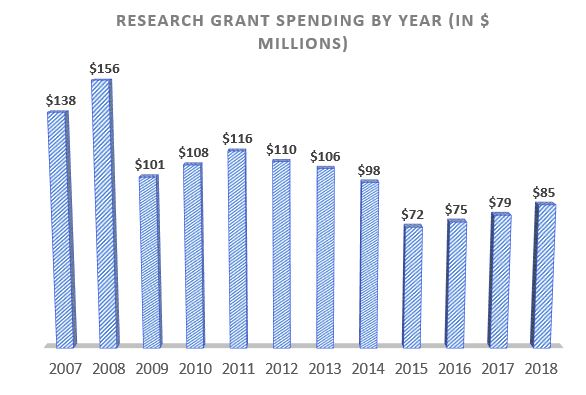
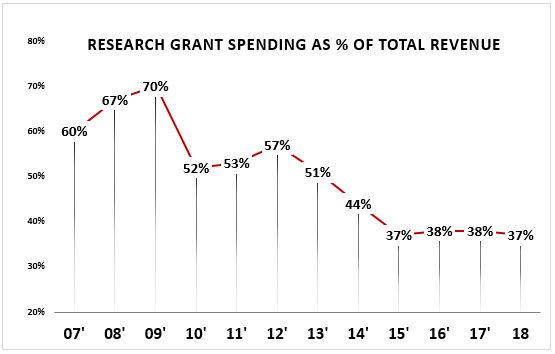
The images above provide an overview of Breakthrough T1D (formally known as JDRF) research spending from 2001 to 2018.

== Advocacy ==
Breakthrough T1D advocates for federally funded T1D research, facilitates the delivery of medical advancements and resources to the T1D community, and supports policies that help prevent, manage, and treat T1D, with an aim toward eventual development of a cure.

Breakthrough T1D has advocated for various kinds of research; in a 2004 article in The Wall Street Journal, the authors observed that the Breakthrough T1D "... has become adept at unleashing an army of hard-to-resist lobbyists – made up of determined parents and their afflicted children – on researchers, politicians and potential donors."

=== Ongoing renewal of the Special Diabetes Program ===
Breakthrough T1D has been supporting the "Special Diabetes Program" (SDP) for 25 years. The program, which receives over $150 million in federal funding per year, provides resources and support for T1D research in cooperation with the NIH. Breakthrough T1D works with the U.S. Senate Diabetes Caucus to advocate for continued funding of the program, which also benefits Breakthrough T1D's research efforts.

=== Insulin access and innovation ===
In response to rising insulin costs and research showing that many people with diabetes are skipping or rationing their insulin, Breakthrough T1D has advocated for insurance companies to provide better health coverage for those living with type 1 diabetes, including making out-of-pocket costs for insulin and other vital diabetes tools more predictable and reasonable. The aim of this advocacy is to ensure people have the freedom to choose treatment strategies that are appropriate for them, and to cover artificial pancreas/automated insulin delivery systems. In response to escalating insulin affordability issues, Breakthrough T1D partnered with nonprofit drug maker Civica to manufacture insulin that will cost $30 a vial, regardless of a patient's insurance provider. Civica insulin is expected to be available to the public in 2025.

Breakthrough T1D also advocates for passage of the INSULIN Act, which caps cost-sharing under private health insurance for a month's supply of selected insulin products at $35 or 25% of a plan's negotiated price (after any price concessions), whichever is less, beginning in 2025.

=== Children's Congress and Kids in the House ===
Breakthrough T1D holds a biennial Children’s Congress, where over 150 children from the U.S. and the world between the ages of 4 and 17 meet with key decision-makers to share their experiences of life with T1D and raise awareness about the condition.

In Australia, Breakthrough T1D advocates meet with members of parliament and key ministers at the Kids in The House event, held at Parliament House in election years. At Kids in the House in November 2024, Minister for Health and Aged Care, Hon Mark Butler MP, committed $50.1m to research by Breakthrough T1D; Shadow Minister for Health and Aged Care, Senator the Hon Anne Ruston, confirming a matched commitment.

=== Government Day ===
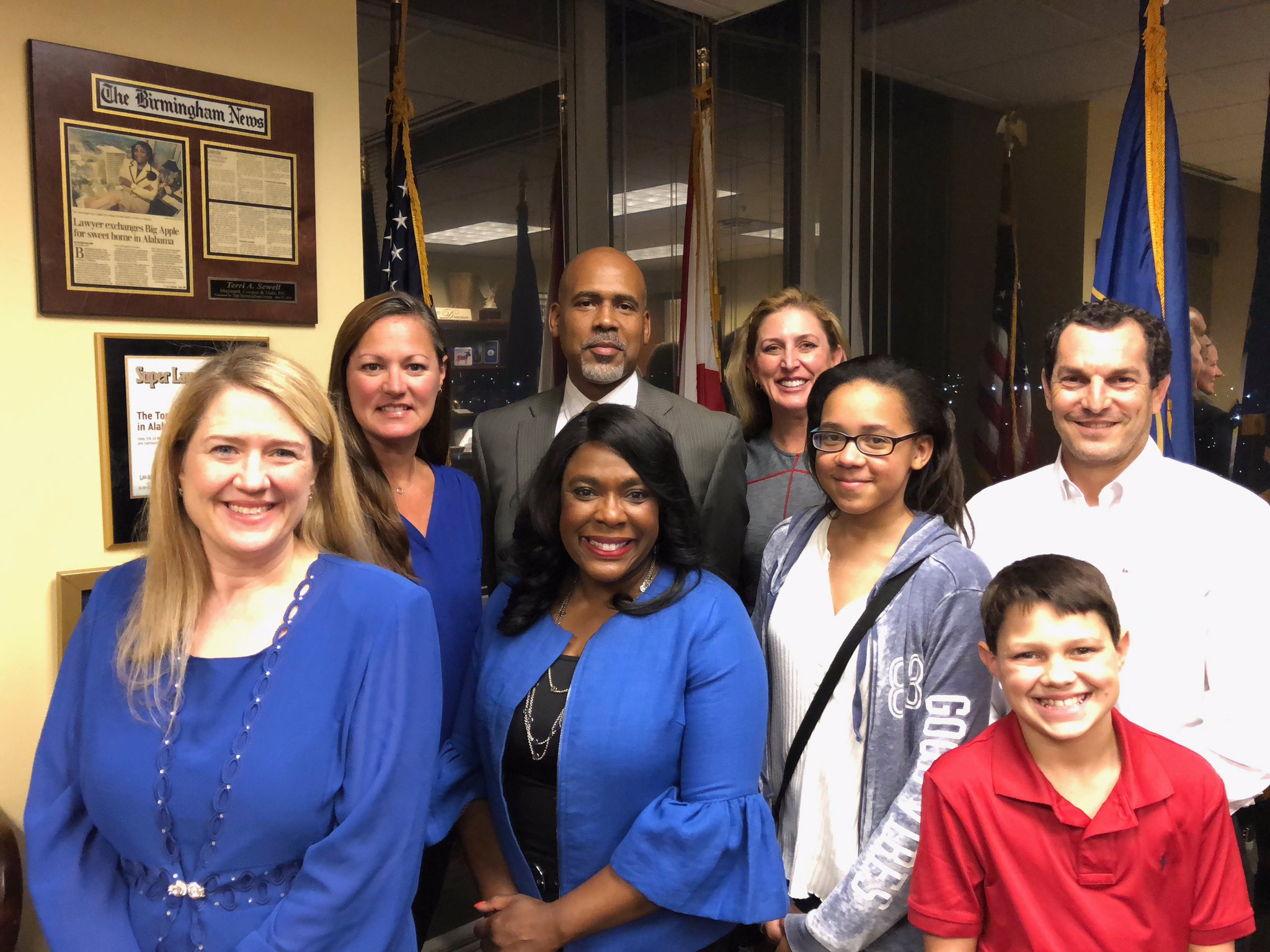
Representatives from Breakthrough T1D (formally known as JDRF) with Terri Sewell on Capitol Hill in 2018

Breakthrough T1D’s Government Day is an annual event where volunteer advocates tell their stories to illustrate the financial, medical, and emotional costs of type 1 diabetes to national leaders in the U.S. and help develop policy responses.

=== Lobbying the FDA ===
In 2011, the FDA made it a priority to clarify the requirements for approval for such a closed-loop monitoring and drug delivery device for T1D, and announced it was preparing draft guidelines. Breakthrough T1D launched a campaign to influence those guidelines to be lenient. After the first closed-loop device was approved in 2016, Breakthrough T1D lobbied insurance companies to cover it. The campaign also put resources into educating people with diabetes on how to navigate health insurance in the United States, and into lobbying Congress to continue funding diabetes research through the NIH.

The FDA lobbying campaign was part of a gradual realignment of the organization to focus on issues other than helping find a cure for type 1 diabetes, but to help treat and manage the disease. This broadened scope meant that the organization increasingly directed its funds to education and advocacy, along with research funding. This included lobbying insurance companies to pay for CGM devices, educating patients on how to advocate for themselves, and lobbying Congress for more NIH funding.

== Community engagement and education ==
Breakthrough T1D offers education and resources, in both English and Spanish, for people of all living with T1D. Some of those who receive support are parents who care for children with T1D, children attending school with T1D, pregnant women with T1D, college students with T1D, and adults with T1D. Whether it is caring for children with T1D, sending children back to school safely, pregnancy and T1D, living with T1D as an adult, college life and T1D, and support groups.

Breakthrough T1D also arranges community engagement which allows newly diagnosed families to connect with other T1D families for mutual support.

=== Care packs ===
Breakthrough T1D provides care packs containing resources and support for children, teens, and adults with T1D. One well-known care pack is the "Bag of Hope" in the US which contains toys and story books for children recently diagnosed with T1D to help them adjust. In Australia, the bag is called KIDSAC and each recipient receives their own Rufus, the Bear with Diabetes.

== Funding ==
Breakthrough T1D receives funding from numerous private donors, corporations and foundations. Funds also come from events such walkathons, bike rides, and galas.

=== Notable donors ===
- Woody Johnson, heir to the Johnson & Johnson fortune
- Jack Benaroya
- Barbara Davis
- Delta Tau Delta fraternity (official national philanthropy)
- Sheraton Grand Seattle – hosts annual 'Gingerbread Village' to raise funds for JDRF
- The Leona M. and Harry B. Helmsley Charitable Trust

== See also ==
- Juvenation
