= Benaroya Research Institute =

Nonprofit organization based in Seattle, US

Coordinates: 47.609885°N 122.328883°W

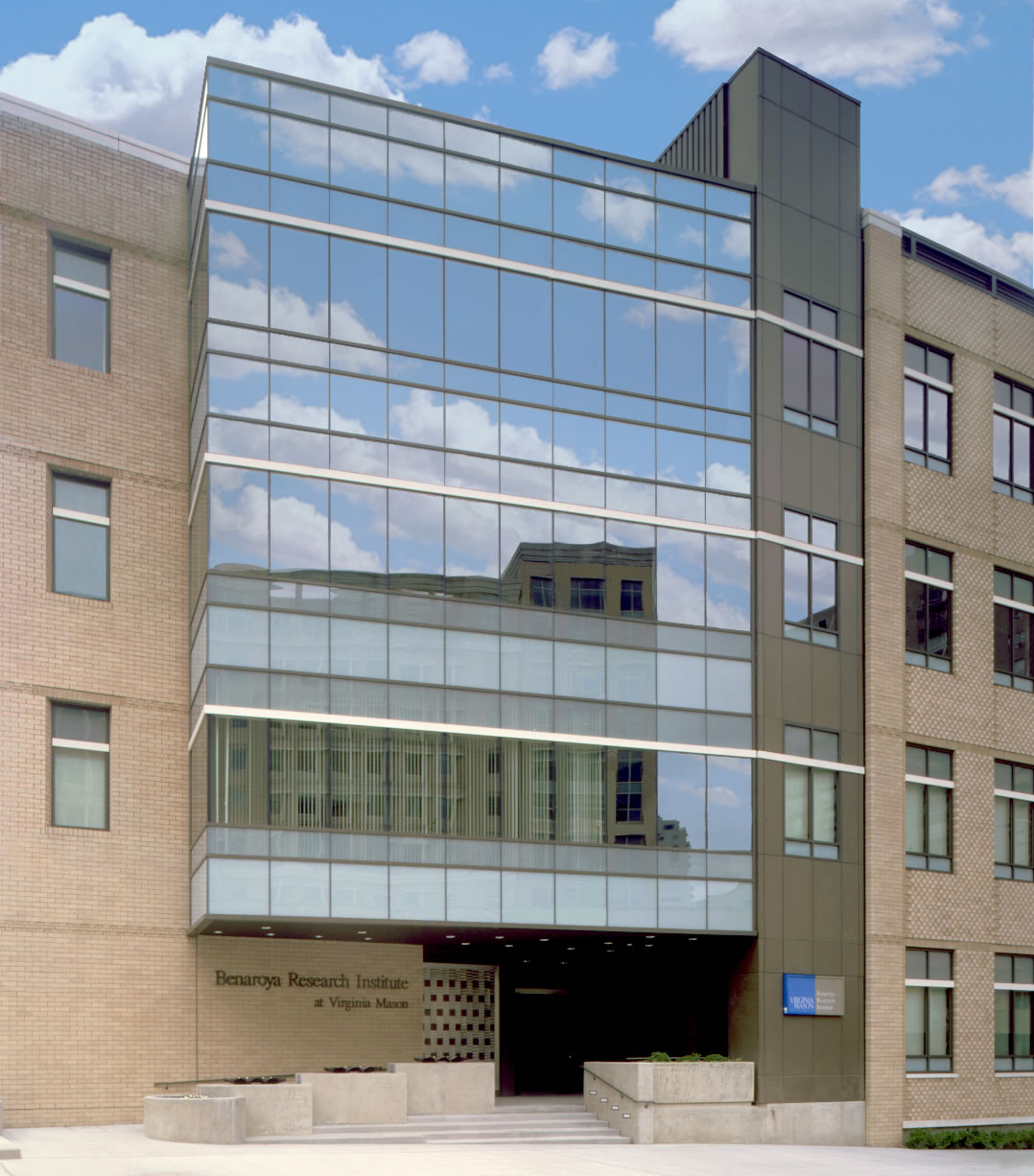
- Established: 1956
- Research type: Basic (non-clinical), clinical and translational research
- Field of research: Immune system and autoimmune disease
- President: Jane H. Buckner, MD
- Location: 1201 Ninth Avenue, Seattle, Washington
- Affiliations: Virginia Mason Health System
- Website: www.benaroyaresearch.org

Benaroya Research Institute (BRI) is a Seattle, Washington, non-profit organization that conducts medical research on diseases and immune disorders, including autoimmune disease. It is affiliated with Virginia Mason Health System, and is located on the campus of Virginia Mason Medical Center.

Much of BRI's research aims to understand how immune cells function and why they malfunction to cause disease. BRI researchers has studied on how immune cells contribute to rheumatoid arthritis, type 1 diabetes, multiple sclerosis, and other diseases. BRI uses translational research and clinical trials.

== History ==
BRI was founded in 1956 as the Virginia Mason Research Center. In 1985, Gerald Nepom became BRI's director and established its immunology research program.

In 1999, BRI moved into a new, 100,000 square-foot building at the corner of Seneca and 9th Avenue, in Seattle's First Hill neighborhood. The building was named the Benaroya Research Institute in honor of donations from the Benaroya family.

In the late 1990s, William Kwok and Nepom developed MHC class II tetramer technology that helps researchers find and study antigen-specific T cells. These tetramers are customized (using different HLA combinations) for use to study how the immune system responds to diseases and pathogens, including influenza, human papillomavirus, allergies, type 1 diabetes, rheumatoid arthritis and multiple sclerosis.

In 2014, BRI was awarded a seven year, $27 million per-year grant to become headquarters of the Immune Tolerance Network (ITN), a clinical research consortium with more than 200 research sites around the world. The ITN is directed by Nepom. BRI's Carla Greenbaum is chair of Type 1 Diabetes TrialNet.

In 2016, Jane Buckner took over from Nepom and became BRI's president. Nepom remained at BRI as a researcher and faculty member.

In March 2019, Margaret McCormick, PhD, became BRI’s Executive Director after their previous director, Homer Lane, retired.

In early August 2020, BRI and Seattle Children’s announced a licensing deal with biotech startup GentiBio. The partnership aims to use engineered regulatory T cells to treat autoimmune and allergic diseases.

== Research ==
BRI studies immune cells and immunotherapies that reprogram those cells; these therapies could inform treatments and cures for type 1 diabetes, multiple sclerosis, rheumatoid arthritis and other diseases. BRI's uses its biorepositories of blood and specimens from individuals with autoimmune diseases and other disorders, and from healthy individuals to conduct research. BRI has eight biorepositories that contain samples dating back to the year 2000.

In 2016, BRI received a five-year, $8 million NIH grant to lead a collaboration that studies how the immune system responds to allergens in the lungs and how those trigger asthma attacks. The collaboration includes researchers from BRI, UW Medicine and the Seattle Children's Research Institute. Later, Buckner and her colleagues received $1 million from the Leona M. and Harry B. Helmsley Charitable Trust to investigate ways to change "attacker" cells into cells that stop disease. In 2017, the Helmsley Trust awarded the researchers an additional $2 million to continue testing the edited cells in the lab.

In 2017, BRI's Erik Wambre and his colleagues identified a type of cell, called Th2A, that appears to drive all allergies. Th2A cells could also be used as biomarkers, or indicators to show whether a person has an allergy or is responding to therapy. In 2018, BRI's Emma L. Kuan and Steven F. Ziegler discovered that a protein called thymic stromal lymphopoietin (TSLP) helps breast cancer tumors survive and spread. They also showed that blocking this protein in laboratory models significantly inhibited the growth of breast cancer tumors.

In 2018, BRI researchers found that many infants sleep for longer when they start eating solid foods. In the study, half the babies subsisted entirely on breast milk until six months of age, while the other half started eating solid foods at three months of age. Compared to babies who were solely breast-fed, infants who ate solid food slept for two more hours per week and woke up two fewer times per night. The findings were published in JAMA Pediatrics, and the study was led by Gideon Lack.

In 2018, BRI's Bernard Khor was awarded an NIH grant to investigate why nearly 50 percent of people with Down syndrome have autoimmune diseases. In June 2019, BRI and Type 1 Diabetes TrialNet showed that an immunotherapy drug called teplizumab delayed T1D for a median of two years for those at high risk for the disease. This is the first time scientists have been able to use a therapy to delay type 1 diabetes. In May 2019, they received a grant from the Parker Institute for Cancer Immunotherapy, JDRF, and The Leona M. and Harry B. Helmsley Charitable Trust to study why some checkpoint inhibitor patients develop an autoimmune response that resembles type 1 diabetes. In September 2019, BRI received a $4.5 million grant from the National Cancer Institute.

In December 2019, BRI launched the Sound Life Project. In March 2020, BRI launched a Gut Immunity program that is composed of three scientists: Adam Lacy-Hulbert, James Lord, and Oliver Harrison, who study different aspects of diseases that impact the gut.

In July 2020, BRI announced that the National Institutes of Health had awarded them over $5.8 million to study COVID-19. In late August 2020, BRI researchers discovered a new pathway that can help protect cells from viruses including COVID-19 and Ebola. They found that one gene, CIITA, can help human cells resist the virus by activating another gene, CD74 p41 splice variants. When activated, the second gene stops the virus from infecting your cells. They used transposon-mediated gene activation to pinpoint which genes prevent infection. In fall 2020, BRI became a testing site for the Pfizer vaccine Phase III trial. About 100 people are participating in this two-year trial. BRI’s team collected data about whether the vaccine prevented COVID-19 infections and side effects participants experienced and is continuing to monitor participants.

== Funding and growth ==
BRI has received United States federal grants for research for a wide variety of research projects, including research on autoimmune diseases, allergies and asthma.

In 2010, BRI became the main beneficiary of the annual Boeing Classic golf tournament. The Boeing Classic has raised more than $6 million from 2005 to 2017 for BRI and other charities.

In 2015, BRI ranked third in National Institutes of Health funding among Washington State research institutions.

In 2016, BRI's annual budget was approximately $70 million. Approximately 71 percent of BRI's 2016 research was supported by government research grants and contracts. The remaining revenues came from philanthropic donations, pharmaceutical studies, foundation grants and other sources.

In December 2020, Jessica Hamerman was awarded a $200,000 research grant from the Lupus Research Alliance.
