= May 1915 Greek parliamentary election =

Election

- 13 June [O.S. 31 May] 1915

All 316 seats in the Hellenic Parliament 159 seats needed for a majority
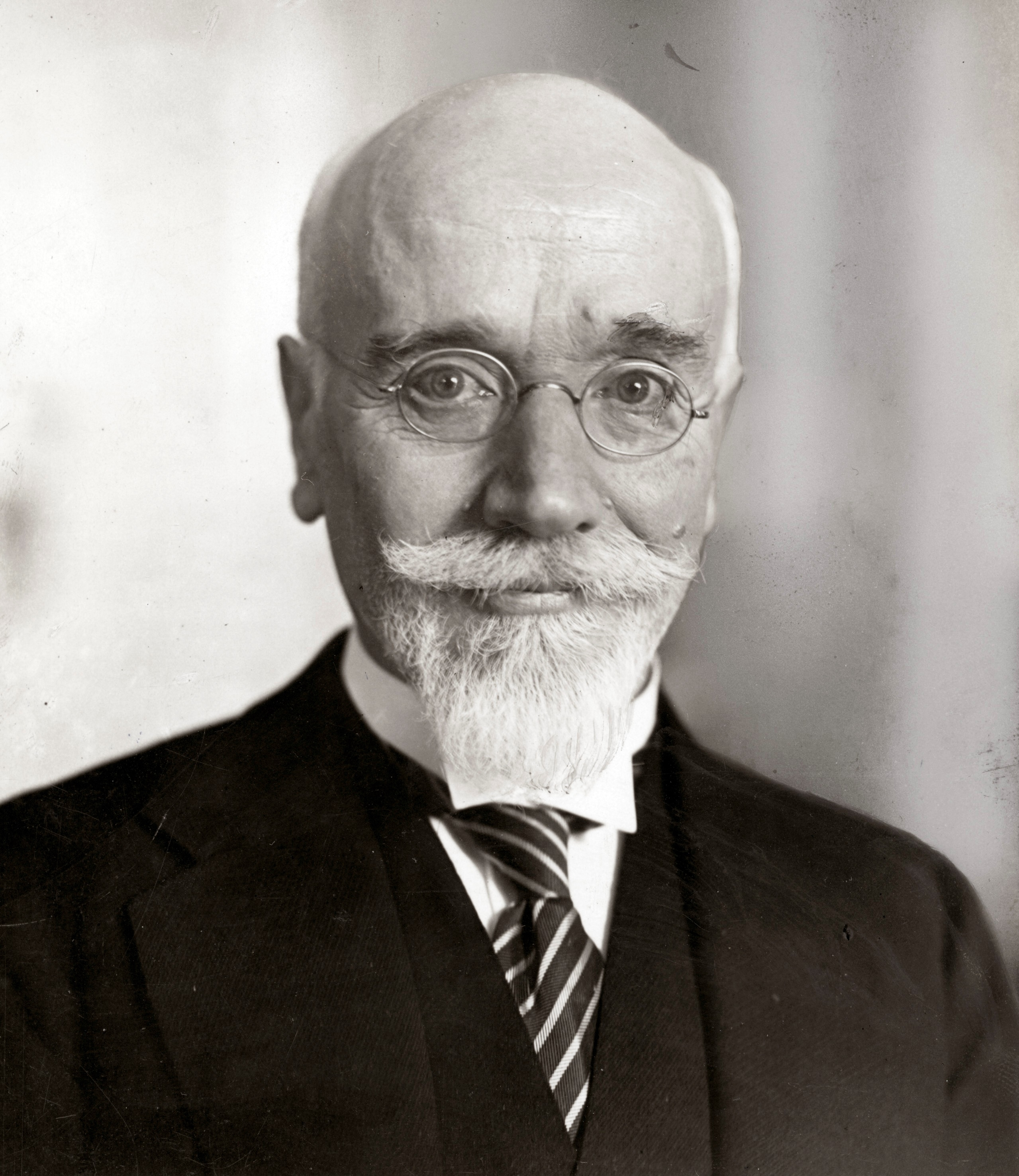

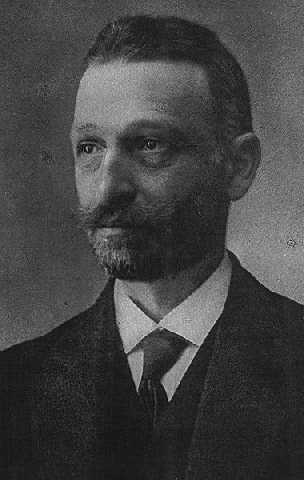

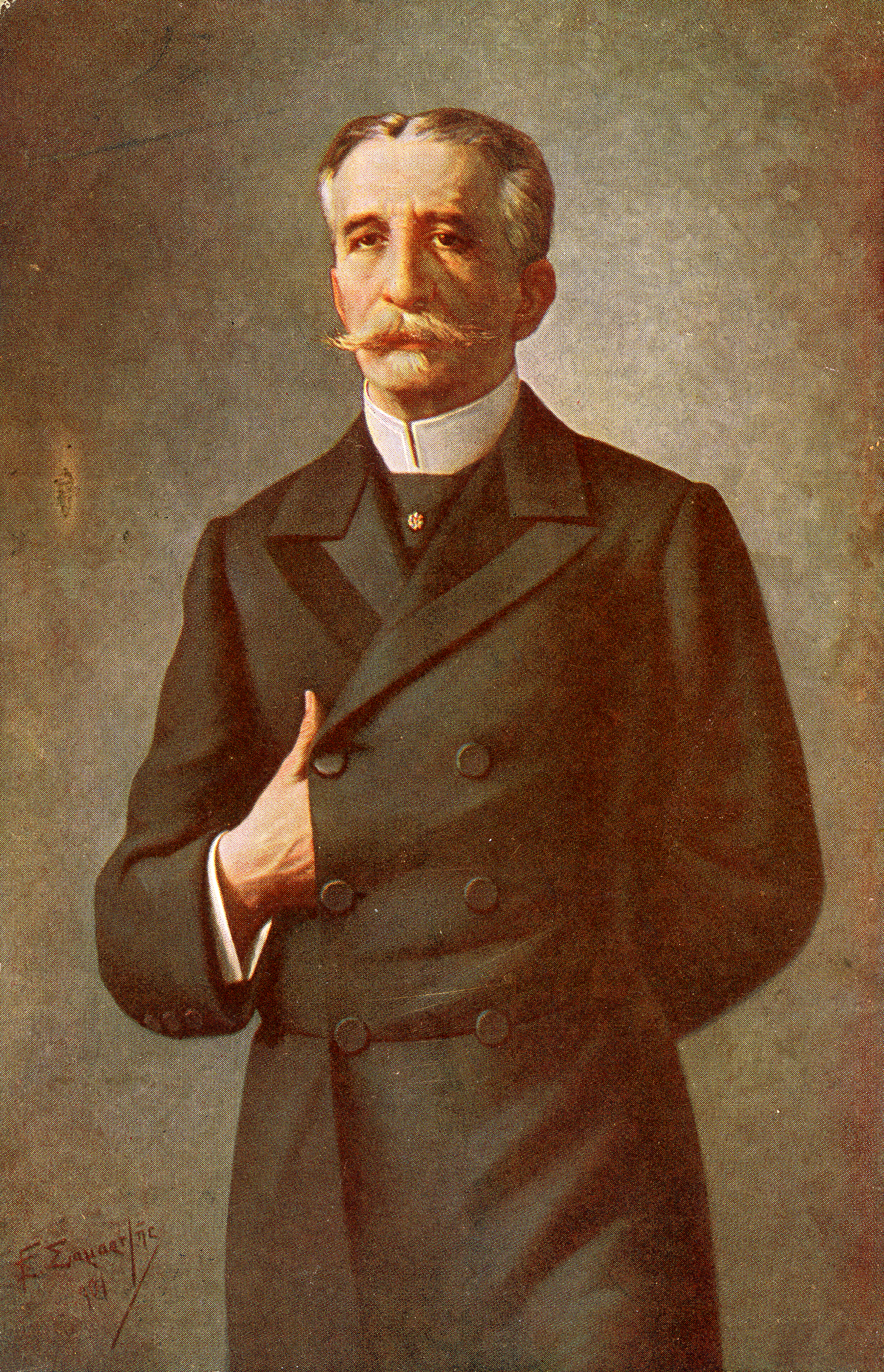

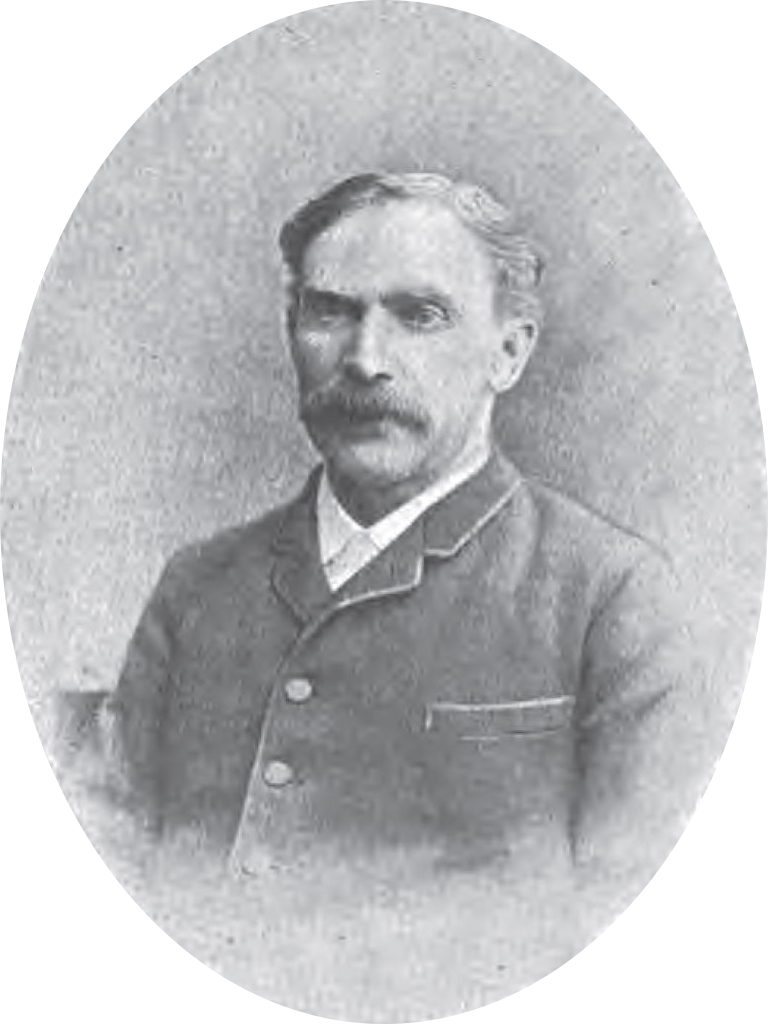
	First party	Second party
Leader	Eleftherios Venizelos	Dimitrios Gounaris
Party	Liberal	National
Seats won	187	95
	Third party	Fourth party
Leader	Georgios Theotokis	Dimitrios Rallis
Party	Theotokis supporters	Rallis supporters
Seats won	12	7
Prime Minister before election
Dimitrios Gounaris
National
Prime Minister after election
Dimitrios Gounaris
National

Parliamentary elections were held in Greece on 13 June [O.S. 31 May] 1915. The result was a landslide victory for Eleftherios Venizelos and his Liberal Party, which won 187 of the 316 seats in Parliament. Venizelos claimed that his victory was proof that the Greek people approved of his policy, favoring the Allies of World War I.

== Results ==
Party	Votes	%	Seats
Liberal Party			187
National Party			95
Supporters of Georgios Theotokis			12
Supporters of Dimitrios Rallis			7
Supporters of Nikolaos Dimitrakopoulos			6
Thessaloniki Socialist Federation			2
Independents			7
Total			316
Total votes	686,990	–	
Source: Nohlen & Stöver

== Aftermath ==
Despite the Liberals' victory, the dispute between Venizelos and King King Constantine I continued. Fresh elections were held in December, which were boycotted by Venizelos and his party as unconstitutional. In August 1916, Venizelos went on to establish a rival Provisional Government of National Defence in the North of the country under the auspices of Entente powers, an event known as the National Schism.

The May 1915 Parliament was subsequently recalled when Constantine was forced to abdicate and leave the country in June 1917 following the Venizelists' victory. As a result, the Parliament was ironically nicknamed by royalists as the "Parliament of the Lazaruses" (Βουλή των Λαζάρων), and continued to sit until the October 1920 elections.

== See also ==
- Greece during World War I
