= Giannitsa =

City in Macedonia, Greece

Giannitsa Γιαννιτσά
- Municipal unit
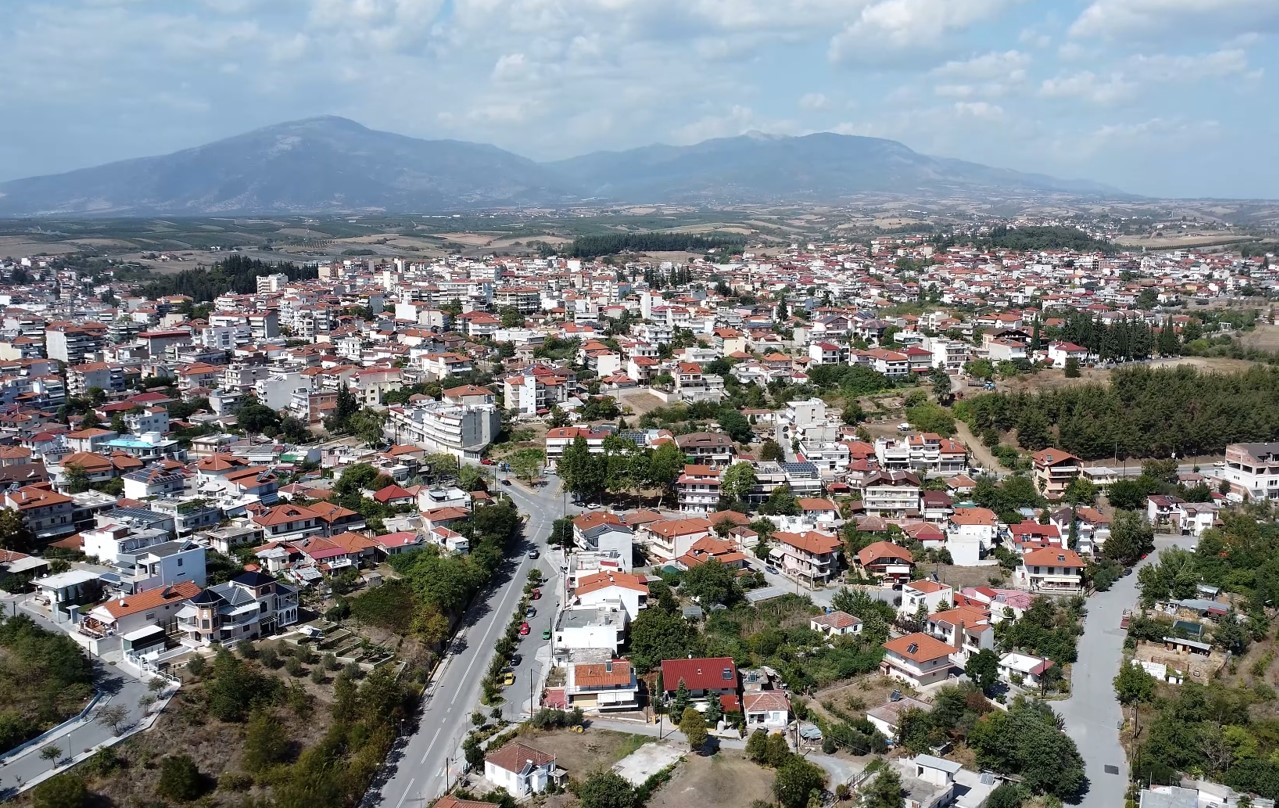
- Aerial view of Giannitsa

- Location within the regional unit

- Location within Greece
- Coordinates: 40°47′N 22°24′E
- Country: Greece
- Administrative region: Central Macedonia
- Regional unit: Pella
- Municipality: Pella

Area
  - Municipal unit: 208.1 km^{2} (80.3 sq mi)
- Elevation: 42 m (138 ft)

Population (2021)
  - Municipal unit: 32,410
  - Municipal unit density: 155.7/km^{2} (403.4/sq mi)
  - Community: 30,498
- Time zone: UTC+2 (EET)
  - Summer (DST): UTC+3 (EEST)
- Postal code: 581 00
- Area code: 23820-2
- Vehicle registration: EE
- Website: www.giannitsa.gr/

Giannitsa (Greek: Γιαννιτσά [ʝaniˈt͡sa]; in English also Yannitsa) is a city in northern Greece, geographically situated in Macedonia and administratively belonging to Central Macedonia. It is the largest urban center of the regional unit of Pella, its historical capital, and the administrative seat of the municipality of Pella. According to the 2021 census, Giannitsa has 32,410 inhabitants. The Municipal Unit of Giannitsa covers an area of 208.105 km^{2}, and includes the following settlements: Ampeleies, Archontiko, Asvestario, Damiano, Eleftherochori, Leptokarya, Melissi, Mesiano, and Paralimni.

Giannitsa is located at a short distance from Mount Paiko to the north and from the banks of the Axios River to the east, within the central part of the fertile Giannitsa–Thessaloniki plain, which constitutes the largest lowland area in Greece. Within the same geographical unit extended, until the mid-20th century, Giannitsa Lake, also known as Borboros 'slime' or Borboros Limen, a natural landscape of considerable ecological, economic, and historical significance, which was radically transformed following its drainage. Today, the city functions as a significant economic and industrial center, as the European Route E86 (Greek National Road 2) runs along the southern outskirts of the urban area.

The city is generally considered to have been founded during the Byzantine period; however, it acquired particular prominence after its conquest by the distinguished Ottoman military commander and conqueror Evrenos Bey. Evrenos Bey settled in Giannitsa, died there, and was buried in the city, thereby endowing it with a strong religious character. The continuous influx of Muslims visiting the city for pilgrimage rendered Giannitsa sacred in their perception, leading to a period of remarkable prosperity during the Ottoman era. To this day, the city retains the epithet 'the Mecca of the Balkans'.

The historical significance of Giannitsa is further enhanced by its proximity to ancient Pella, the capital of the Kingdom of Macedon and the birthplace of Alexander the Great, the archaeological remains of which are located approximately 7 km (4 miles) from the city. Giannitsa lies at a distance of 48 km (30 miles) from Thessaloniki, and 332 km (206.3 miles) from Athens.

== Name ==
=== Etymology ===
The prevailing scholarly interpretation concerning the toponym of the city of Giannitsa maintains that, during the 1380s, Gazi Evrenos re-founded the pre-existing Byzantine settlement known as Vardarion and renamed it Yenice-i Vardar (Ottoman Turkish: يڭيجۀ واردار) that is, 'New Vardar' or 'new (town) of Vardar'. The settlement also used to appear under the forms Vardar Yenicesi (in order to distinguish from Yenice-i Karasu, modern-day Genisea) or simply Yenice and Yenidje. In other languages, the city is called: Bulgarian: Енидже Вардар, Enidzhe Vardar or Пазар, Pazar, Macedonian: Ениџе Вардар, Enidzhe Vardar and Aromanian: Yenige.

=== Origin ===
The derivation of the name from the Turkish language was also supported by the academic archaeologist Georgios Oikonomos. Beyond this dominant view, several alternative hypotheses regarding the origin of the toponym have been proposed. According to one interpretation, the name is associated with the personal name Giannitsas ('the estates of Giannitsas') and is attributed to a hypothetical Byzantine landowner of the region. The philologist and academic Georgios Mistriotis suggested an etymology from the Turkish word Yunan ('Greek'), arguing that the Ottoman conquerors likened the local population to the Ionians of Anatolia. By contrast, the scholar, academic, and linguist Georgios Hatzidakis maintained that the name of the city has a Greek etymological origin and is linked to the personal name Giannis (John), which during the Byzantine period was used in the naming of provincial fortresses and settlements. He further argued that, during the early phase of Ottoman rule, the Ottomans lacked the capacity to impose new toponyms systematically, and he reinforced his position by pointing to the occurrence of various related forms, such as Giannitsis, Giannitsios, and Giannitseas, in different locations throughout Byzantine Greece.

During the later phases of Ottoman rule (18th–19th centuries), according to William Martin Leake, who had visited the city, the toponym underwent Hellenization and appeared in the forms Iannitza or Giannitza, while the variant Yenitsa (Γενιτσά) was also frequently employed. Under this latter form, the city was incorporated into the modern Greek state, until the official establishment of the contemporary form Giannitsa in February 1926.

== Population ==
Year	Population
2021	30,498
2011	29,789
2001	29,364
1991	22,504
1981	23,966
1971	21,188
1961	19,693
1951	16,640
1940	12,964
1928	9,128
1913	7,167

== History ==
=== Ancient ===
Map of the ancient Kingdom of Macedonia, depicting, among other regions, Bottiaea, whose territory extended in front of and around Lake Lydias (Giannitsa) and encompassed its constituent settlements.

In antiquity, the region of present-day Giannitsa was known as Bottiaea and provides evidence of uninterrupted human presence from the Early Neolithic period (late 7th–early 6th millennium BC). This is attested by the Neolithic settlement identified at the area of "Old Market", on the southern hill of the city. This settlement is considered among the earliest Neolithic installations in the European mainland. According to ancient traditions, the earliest inhabitants of the region were the Bottiaeans, whose mythical progenitor was Botton, said to have originated from Crete. Related narratives variously ascribe the origin of the Bottiaeans either to Minoans who survived an expedition to Sicily or to descendants of Athenians who escaped the Minotaur. The Bottiaeans bordered the Pierians to the south, the Bryges to the west, the Mygdonians to the east, and the Almopians to the north. Bottiaea comprised a number of important and prosperous settlements, including Kyrros, Tyrissa, Bounomos, Ichnae, and Atalante, the remains of which are located at a short distance from modern Giannitsa.

Human occupation continued without interruption during the Bronze Age (3200–1100 BC) and the Early Iron Age (1100–750 BC), to which period a cemetery discovered at the exit of the city toward Edessa is dated. Moreover, numerous chance finds attest to sustained human activity throughout the Hellenistic period as well. The region’s geographical position, at the convergence of lowland, coastal, and mountainous zones and along major Balkan communication routes, conferred particular strategic and economic significance upon the settlement. During the Middle Neolithic period, the original settlement appears to have been abandoned, most likely as a result of rising sea levels and the extensive inundation of adjacent lands.

In the 7th century BC, the Argead Macedonians became established in the area during their advance from Argos in the Peloponnese. King Perdiccas I expelled the Bottiaeans from their homelands, forcing their relocation to Chalkidiki, and thereby incorporated Bottiaea into the Macedonian kingdom. Thereafter, historical references to the region are relatively scarce until the early 4th century BC, when King Archelaus I transferred the royal capital from Aegae to Pella, a new city he founded on the shores of the Thermaic Gulf. From that point onward, the region of Giannitsa formed part of the Pellaean territory. Pella rapidly developed into a major administrative, economic, and cultural center of the ancient Greek world, reaching a peak of prosperity and international prominence particularly during the reigns of Philip II and Alexander the Great.

The designation Bottiaea for the region of Giannitsa remained in use until the early Byzantine period, after which the plain on which Giannitsa was built came to be known as Campania, a name reflecting the fertility of the land. In 1913, Apostolos Arvanitopoulos, Ephor of Antiquities of Western Macedonia, proposed that Giannitsa be renamed Bottiaea, with the aim of restoring the ancient toponym. This proposal, however, was not implemented, as the existing Ottoman name was considered to be of Greek etymological origin.

=== Byzantine ===
Map of Byzantine Greece. The Theme of Thessalonica is depicted in the northern part of the map, within which the Vardárion was administratively included.

Contrary to the prevailing assumption that Giannitsa was founded during the Ottoman period, chance archaeological finds in the area of the Old Market suggest that the city can be specifically dated to the Middle Byzantine period, during which it appears to have existed as a prosperous settlement, owing to its location along the course of the Via Egnatia, under the name Vardárion. The earliest attestation of this toponym dates to the 11th century, during the Komnenian dynasty.

During his military campaigns in Macedonia, c. 1383–1387, Evrenos Bey, the military commander of Sultan Murad I, encountered an already developed settlement, which he captured and subsequently utilized as a strategic point of control and a base for the further conquest of the Balkan Peninsula. This interpretation is further corroborated by 17th-century traveler Evliya Çelebi, who recorded a local tradition, which refers to the existence of two fortresses allegedly built by rulers of the lineage of Philip V. These fortifications were later dismantled by the Ottomans, who undertook extensive urban and administrative reorganization, thereby transforming the settlement into an urban center.

The grant of the region to Evrenos Bey is embedded in a complex nexus of legends, oral traditions, and historical narratives. According to one version of the tradition, Murad I allowed Evrenos to claim as much land as he could traverse on horseback within the course of a single day. The direct grant of Giannitsa by the sultan himself is also attested by the Byzantine historian Laonikos Chalkokondyles.

Another tradition conveys the same intention through a symbolic compact, according to which the extent of land to come into his possession was defined by the outline of a cowhide. Evrenos Bey, endowed, according to the narrative, with Herculean strength, cut the hide into a long and narrow strip, which was said to encompass a vast area, within which the new settlement nucleus was established. A further tradition attributes the choice of the site to the natural environment of the region: while searching for the most suitable place for himself and his army to settle, Evrenos allegedly ordered one thousand of his slaves to release feathers into the air and to continue their march until the feathers fell to the ground, thereby indicating the most favorable location. The feathers ultimately descended upon a fertile plain, naturally protected to the north by the Paiko mountain range and bordered to the south by the ancient Lake Loudias (later known as the Lake of Giannitsa). The strategic significance of the area was further enhanced by the passage of the Via Egnatia, which connected Thessaloniki with the other urban centers of Macedonia. Evrenos was reportedly impressed by the site and established his new seat there. According to a local tradition, when Evrenos initiated the conquest of the city, its inhabitants offered determined resistance but were ultimately unable to prevail. Nevertheless, the Ottomans, acknowledging their persistence and obstinacy, are said to have referred to them as genatzides (from the Turkish genat, meaning "stubbornness"), from which the name of the settlement, Genitza, is traditionally derived.

=== Ottoman ===
==== Early period ====
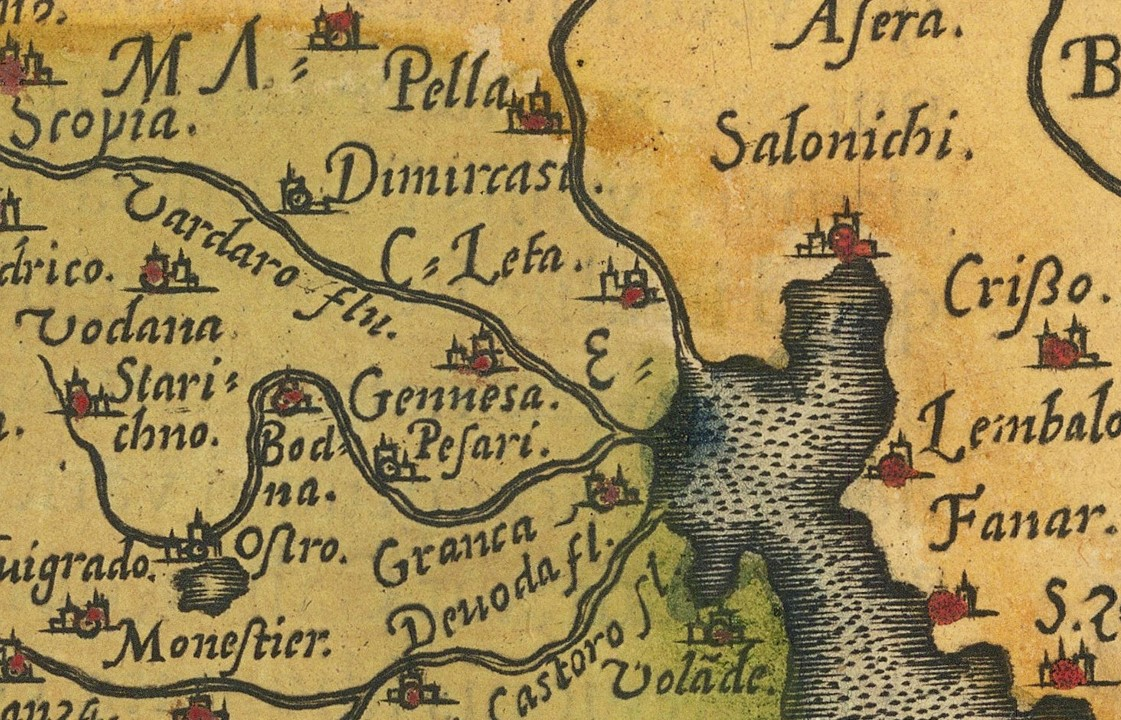
Cartographic detail from Abraham Ortelius's map of Greece (1584), depicting Giannitsa as Gennesa, located adjacent to one of the distributaries of the Axios River

After establishing himself with his army, Evrenos repopulated the city with numerous Ottoman families, Yörük pastoralists and warriors, who had previously resided in Serres and whose original homeland was the Saruhan region of Anatolia. This initiative aimed, on the one hand, at bolstering the population of Yenidje and, on the other, at creating a social and religious environment aligned with the needs of the devout Muslims of the period. Concurrently, Evrenos constructed a mosque, a caravanserai, an imaret, a madrasa, a bathhouse, and an aqueduct. The city's water supply was secured through underground channels and stone-built bridges that conveyed potable water from Mount Paiko, while the plains surrounding the city were utilized as pastures for his cavalry horses. As part of further territorial expansion, Evrenos incorporated most of the neighboring settlements he had captured into the province, with Yenidje as its administrative center. Consequently, the kaza of Yenidje encompassed over one hundred villages and towns, covering an extensive geographical area stretching from the mouth of the Axios River to the Moglena plains, and from the foothills of Mount Vermio to the outskirts of Thessaloniki. The majority of these settlements functioned as waqfs, from which Evrenos and, later, his descendants derived their revenues. Upon his death in 1417, Evrenos was interred in a mausoleum within the city, a fact that conferred significant religious prestige upon Yenidje and transformed it into a sacred city for Muslims from that time onward.

Jurisdiction over the city and its waqfs passed to Evrenos's eldest son, Barak Bey. In 1423, Barak Bey collaborated with Sultan Murad II in a campaign aimed at recapturing Thessaloniki from the Venetians. Using Yenidje as a base, Murad II successfully captured the city on 29 March 1430 following a tightly conducted three-day siege. In the aftermath of the conquest, the city experienced a dramatic population decline, creating an urgent need for demographic restoration. Accordingly, while on a hunting expedition in Yenidje, Murad II ordered a thousand Turkish families to leave the city and settle in Thessaloniki.

==== Flourishing ====
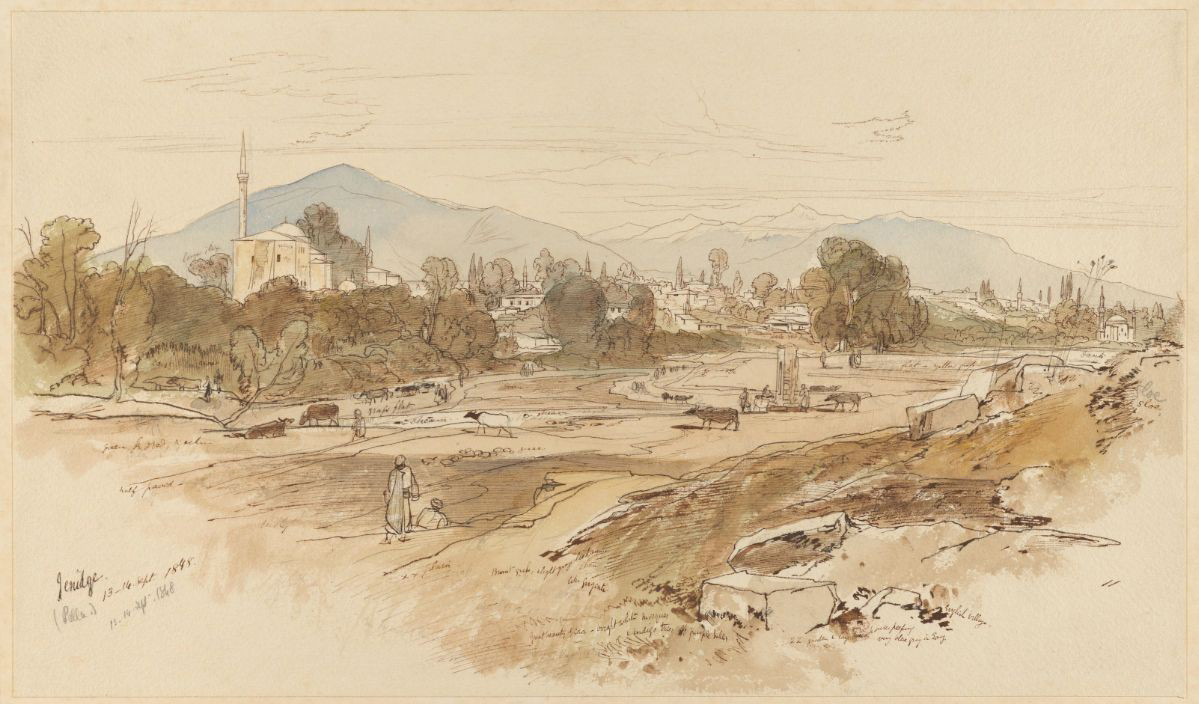
Watercolour painting of the town of Yenidje by Edward Lear, 1848

From the beginning of the 15th century, Yenidje developed into a major administrative and military hub of the Ottoman realm, marked by the permanent presence of officials of high rank and prestige. By the middle of the century, the city's urban and civic development had reached its peak, with the construction of numerous public works and monuments under Şemseddin Ahmed Bey, the grandson of Evrenos. At the same time, Yenidje emerged as a center of letters and the arts, where Ottoman literature and Islamic scholarship flourished. Notably, a significant portion of the population was distinguished by a high level of education, and several poets, scholars, and scientists who served the sultan originated from Yenidje. The Ottoman inhabitants of the city largely spoke Persian, albeit in a more differentiated form in terms of both pronunciation and vocabulary, which they referred to as Rumili Farsisi ('Rumelian Persian'). As a meeting place for cultivated men of letters, the city developed into a brilliant milieu of Persianate culture. Aşık Çelebi, impressed by Yenidje's large Persian-speaking community, referred to the city as a "hotbed of Persian". The city's spiritual prominence was further enhanced by the presence of Sheikh Abdullah al-Ilahi, a missionary of the dervish order, renowned throughout the territories of the Ottoman Empire. He settled in Yenidje with the purpose of educating the children of the local Bey and other prominent Ottoman families. Following his death, he was buried in a tekke within the city, which subsequently acquired a pilgrimage character, as he was venerated as a saint by the faithful.

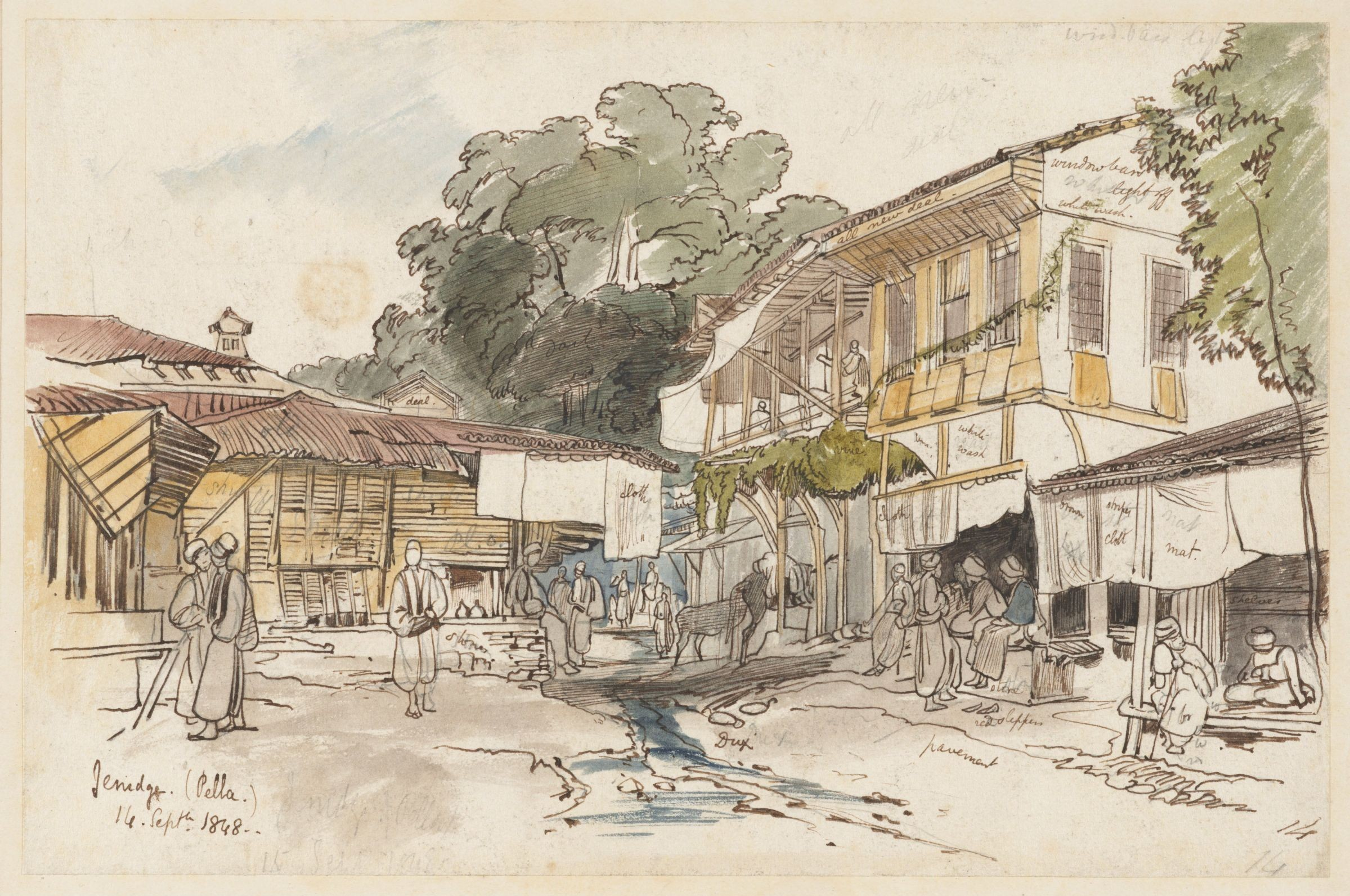
Watercolour painting of a street of the market of Yenidje by Lear, 1848

In 1519 (Hijri 925), its population consisted of 793 Muslim, 25 Christian and 24 Jewish households, and it was a zeamet of Mevlana Ahmet Çelebi. The Christians of Yenidje, recorded as Rûm in the Ottoman tax registers, resided in a hilly area north of the urban center, known as the 'Varosi' quarter. The Jewish community lived within the Turkish sector and had settled there following their expulsion from the regions of Spain and Portugal.

During the 16th and 17th centuries, Yenidje experienced its peak period of prosperity, emerging as a major center of attraction for the Ottoman aristocracy. The city's urban character was defined by a dense concentration of buildings and monuments of high aesthetic value in Ottoman architectural style, while its overall prosperity was clearly reflected in its residential fabric. The dwellings of the majority of Ottoman inhabitants consisted of one- or two-storey stone mansions, surrounded by spacious paved courtyards that included gardens, vineyards, and private fountains. During this period, the population of the city is estimated to have reached approximately 50,000 inhabitants, comprising around 10,000 houses, 20 mosques, seven Ottoman schools, two madrasas, approximately 700 shops, and a bezesten. Sultan Mehmed IV visited the city in 1670, during which he was hosted at the residence of Suleiman Bey. Overall, Yenidje was a renowned Ottoman metropolis during the period of the Pax Ottomana, distinguished by pronounced oriental characteristics that shaped everyday life, urban appearance, dress, cuisine and the social customs of its inhabitants. The fact that the city was not enclosed by defensive walls but functioned as an open urban center contributed both to its economic prosperity – through the full exploitation of the surrounding plain – and to its role as a hub attracting populations of diverse ethnic and religious backgrounds who sought favorable conditions of livelihood and employment.

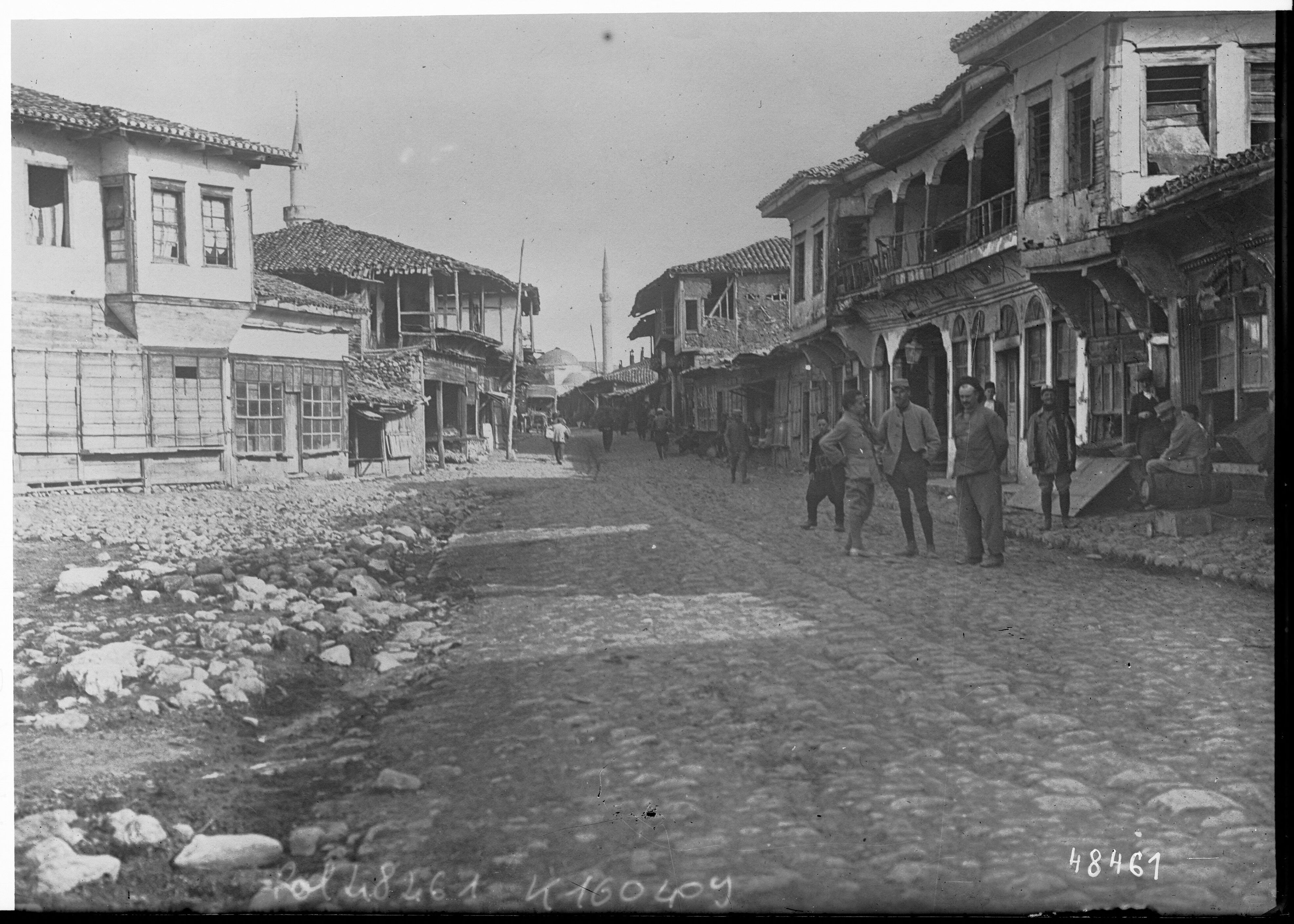
The Ottoman Market, as documented in a photograph taken by French soldiers in 1916. The image depicts the street leading to the Iskender Bey Mosque, with an inn on the left and a row of shops on the right.

During its period of prosperity, the economy of Yenidje was based primarily on agricultural production, with the principal sectors being the cultivation of tobacco, cereals, cotton, and silk. The tobacco of Yenidje, renowned throughout the Ottoman Empire for its high quality and distinctive aroma, constituted a major export commodity and was widely distributed to markets in the Arab world as well as to the sultanic palace, where it was esteemed as a luxury product. Together with cotton, it formed a well-known object of trade among numerous foreign and non-Muslim merchants, particularly those based in Thessaloniki, and was exported by sea to European ports such as Marseille, as well as to markets in the East. Another notable local product consisted of the leeches of the Lake of Yenidje, which were likewise exported to Europe and regarded as indispensable items in pharmacies due to their use as a bloodletting agent. At the same time, sericulture experienced remarkable growth, with annual production reaching approximately 100,000 okas of silkworm cocoons, a fact that also explains the widespread presence of mulberry trees within the urban and peri-urban landscape of the city. Cereals – primarily wheat, barley, rye, and oats – as well as maize, were cultivated on non-irrigated hilly lands, while wine constituted a popular product of the household economy, with numerous vineyards located within the neighborhoods of Yenidje.

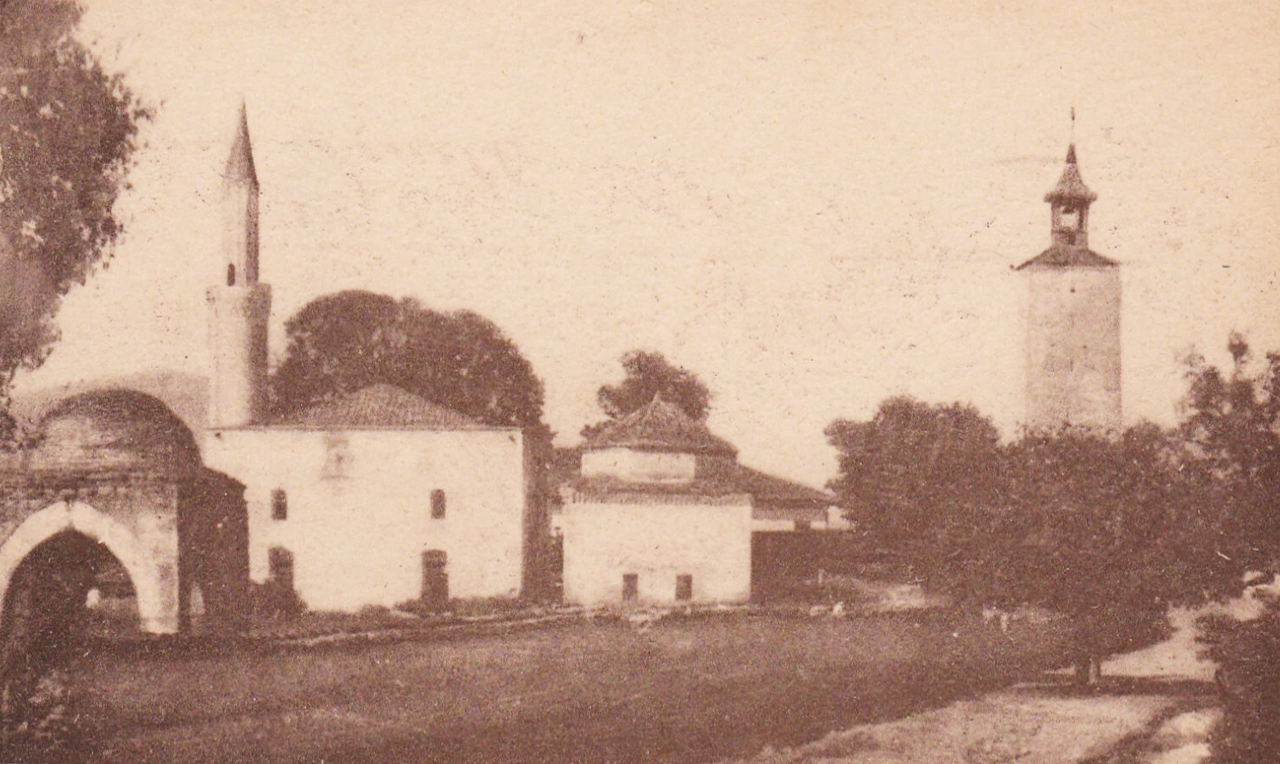
A 1900s postcard depicting Yenidje, featuring the Clock Tower, a mosque, and other Ottoman-era buildings

Beyond the agrarian sector, a notable artisanal and manufacturing activity developed, leading Yenidje to emerge as one of the most important commercial centers in the Balkans. The city's market, well organized and permanently bustling, comprised a large number of shops and workshops. Its most renowned products included finely carved wooden objects, such as ladles, plates, and other household utensils, as well as tobacco pipes; woven goods, with particular emphasis on scarves; and basketry products, including baskets, panniers, hampers, beehives, and demijohns. These items were produced by local craftsmen using willow, osier, and reed, materials found in abundance along the shores of the lake. The market of Yenidje was also well known for its inns (khans), numbering thirty-five in total, which functioned as hubs of provisioning and overnight accommodation for travelers and caravans along the Thessaloniki–Monastir route, while tanneries served the needs of pack animals. The city's pronounced cosmopolitan character was further reinforced by the presence of banks and agencies of commercial firms from European and non-European countries by the holding of the weekly bazaar every Thursday, and by the annual autumn trade fair, which lasted throughout the month of November. This fair was the second largest in Macedonia after that of Serres, and attracted merchants, craftsmen, and visitors from across all the Ottoman territories.

==== Relationship with Ancient Pella ====
In addition to its religious significance, Yenice-i Vardar attracted the attention of antiquarians and European travelers, a phenomenon directly linked to its proximity to the site of ancient Pella. During the 18th and 19th centuries, numerous scattered archaeological remains from the Classical and Hellenistic periods were recorded within the urban fabric of the city, particularly along roadways and burial sites, as well as in the surrounding fields. Notably, a significant portion of later constructions, including cemeteries, had been built or restored using building materials derived from the ruins of Pella.

A characteristic example is a funerary stone that, by the late 19th-century, stood adjacent to a mosque in Yenice-i Vardar, inscribed with the text ΙΛΑΡΟC ΓΑΛΑΤΗ ΓΛΥΚΥΤΑΤΗ ΓΥΝΑΙ ΚΙ ΜΝΗΜΗϹ ΧΑΡΙΝ ('To Ιlaros Galate, the sweetest woman, in memory'). Consequently, many travelers identified Yenice with the ancient Macedonian capital or considered it a direct historical and topographical continuation. For instance, the English author and traveler Edward Lear, who produced watercolors of the city, labeled the location in the lower right corner as 'Yenidje (Pella)'. Another example is the Austrian diplomat Johann Georg von Hahn, who noted upon visiting Yenice: The Turkish town inland is the successor of the nearby old Macedonian capital, inheriting its urban strength and annual commercial fair. However, some observers distinguished between Yenice and ancient Pella. For example, the Greek writer and Enlightenment thinker Rigas Feraios, in his Charta of Greece, placed Yenice (Yanitza) on the site of the ancient city of Spartolos in Bottiaea. Nevertheless, most pre-modern maps identified Yenice with Pella.

==== Christian Life in Ottoman Giannitsa ====
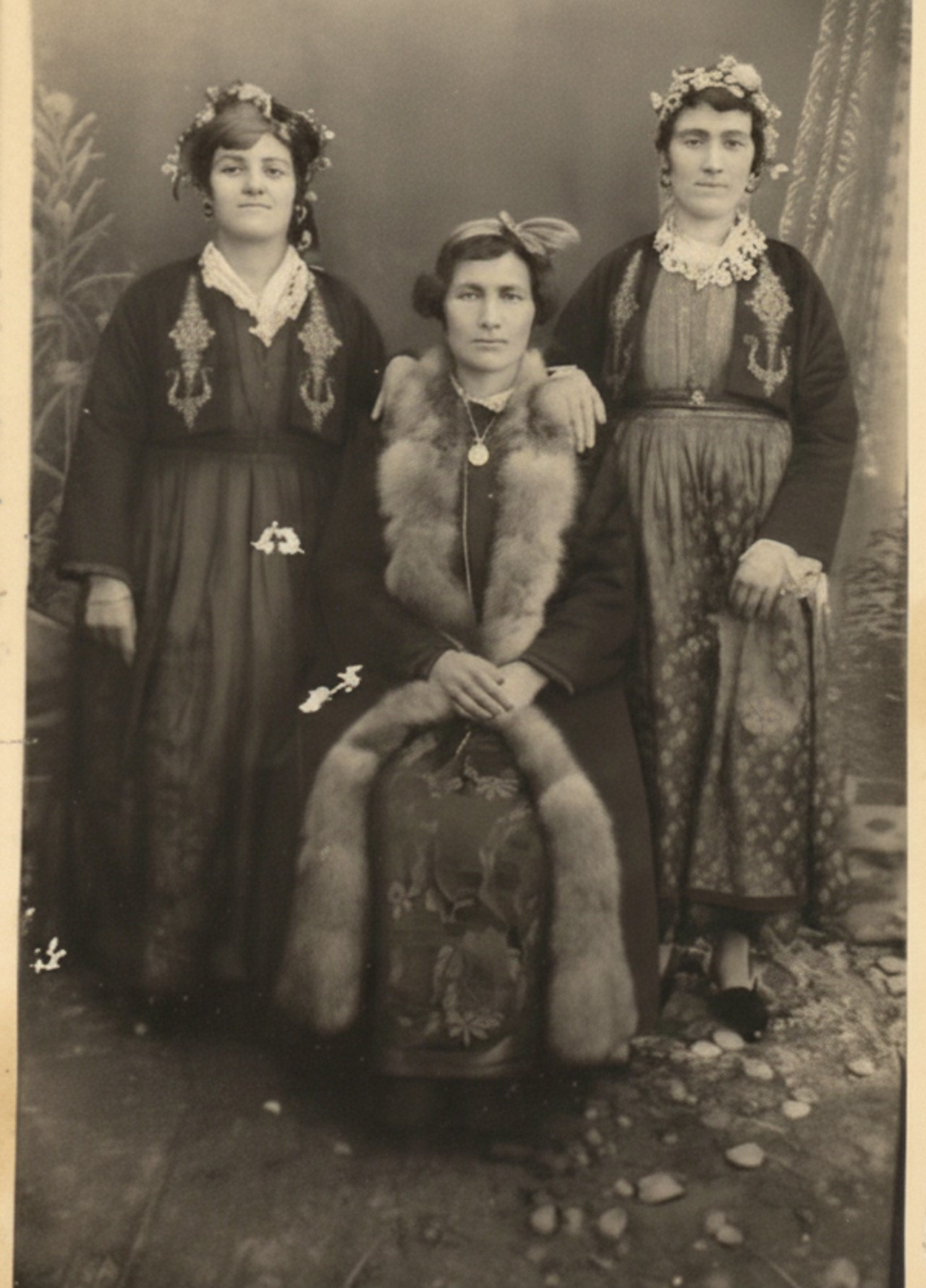
Photograph of Greek women from Yenice-i Vardar dressed in traditional local attire, c. 1900

In contrast to the privileges and favorable living conditions enjoyed by the Muslim population of Yenice-i Vardar, the daily life of the Christian inhabitants was generally marked by hardship. The Christian residents, referred to as rayahs by the Ottoman authorities, were subjected to heavy taxation, particularly in the wine trade, and faced various restrictions concerning the organization and use of the built environment. Specifically, strict regulations governed the architecture of Christian houses, which were required not to exceed a certain height, approximately 5.7 meters, and were prohibited from using certain colors, such as red. Furthermore, the construction of Christian churches within the urban fabric was forbidden, compelling the Orthodox community to relocate their religious activities to remote and inaccessible sites. An additional burden on the Christian population was the implementation of the devshirme system. As early as 1686, young Christians were conscripted for service in the Janissary corps, with similar levies recorded in 1748, 1770, and 1810, particularly to staff units assigned to the defense of coastal fortresses in the Peloponnese. Despite these adverse conditions, the Christian community of Yenice succeeded in maintaining certain forms of intellectual and educational activity. By the 17th-century, the city hosted a Greek-language school, which remained operational until the early 19th-century.

The strengthening and gradual demographic growth of the Christian population in Yenice-i Vardar can be attributed both to the continuous settlement of inhabitants from neighboring rural centers and to successive migratory movements from other regions. Indicative examples include the resettlement of inhabitants from Moscopole following the destruction of the city by Ali Pasha in 1788, the arrival of persecuted residents of Naousa who had participated in the Greek Revolution of 1821, and the settlement of a little Megleno-Romanian populations in the late 19th-century, who were gradually integrated and assimilated into the local social and urban environment.

Over time, the Christians of Yenice-i Vardar came to be characterized by bilingualism, employing both the Greek language and a local vernacular. This idiom consisted of a composite of Slavic, Greek, and Turkish lexical elements and served both intra-communal communication and agricultural activities, as it was widely used throughout the broader region. Despite the everyday use of this vernacular, the inhabitants employed Greek script, and ecclesiastical services were conducted exclusively in Greek. The Ottoman authorities officially recognized them under the designation Rum ('Greeks'). By the late 19th-century, fiscal registers also record the presence of Christians classified as Bulgar ('Bulgarians').

==== Revolutionary times ====
Until the late 17th-century, Greek armatoles units operated in the region of Yenice-i Vardar, having been appointed by the central Ottoman administration with the task of securing mountain passes and roads against attacks by Turco-Albanian groups. Despite their institutional role, the armatoloi frequently engaged in arbitrary and illegal practices, including the appropriation of tax revenues and the use of violence against passing populations. Within this context, the mutasarrif of Thessaloniki, Hasan, unable to staff the region with sufficient Turkish officials, proceeded to appoint Albanian armed units. Their presence, however, further aggravated the situation, as they became extensively involved in raiding, destruction, and acts of violence. As a consequence of the loss of their privileges, the Greek armatoles withdrew to the mountains, where they formed armed bands in cooperation with local klephts and undertook armed action against both Ottoman and Albanian forces. In 1712, Sultan Ahmed III, by imperial firman, entrusted Halil Çavuş, officer of the janissaries of Tikveš, with the suppression and exemplary punishment of the brigand groups operating in the region of Yenice-i Vardar.

During the period of the Greek War of Independence (1821), the Christian kodjabashis and merchants of Yenice-i Vardar were arrested and imprisoned by the Ottoman authorities on account of their involvement in the uprising, while those who escaped fled clandestinely. The governor of Giannitsa, Ahmed Bey, leading a force of 500 Yürüks, undertook the suppression of revolutionary movements in the wider region. He played a decisive role in the battles of Thessaloniki and Vasilika in June 1821 and carried out extensive destruction of villages in Chalkidiki, accompanied by massacres of the local population.

==== Late Ottoman ====
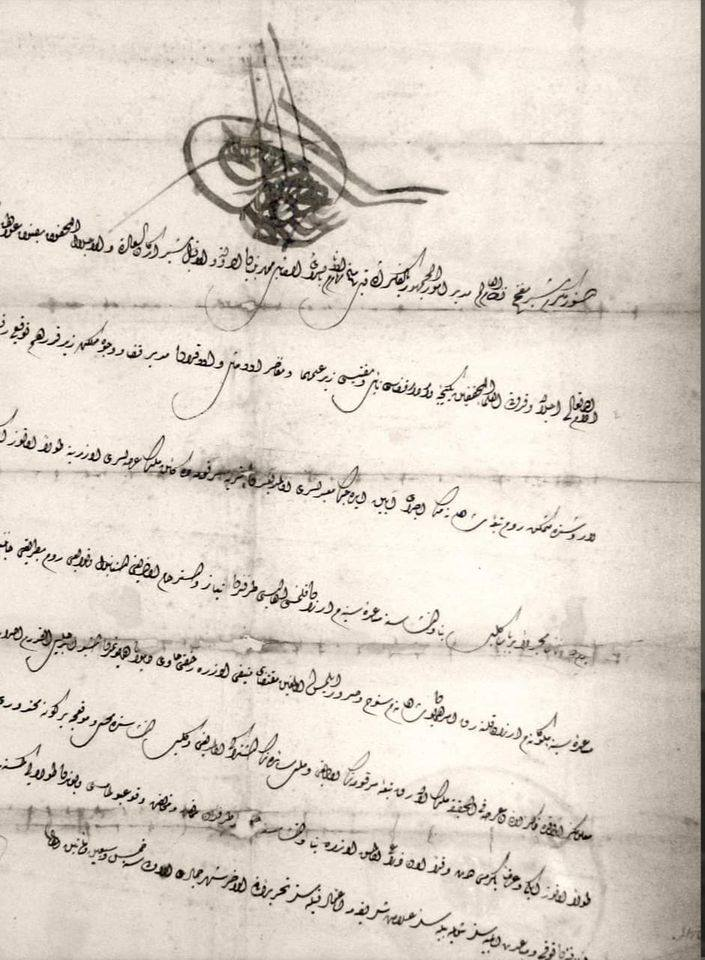
The firman of Sultan Abdülmecid I concerning the construction of the first Christian church in Yenidje

In the subsequent years, the Turkish population of Yenidje declined sharply as a result of cholera epidemics that broke out in 1839. This demographic contraction had adverse consequences, as it led to a shortage of labour in the tobacco and cotton plantations and, consequently, to the economic downturn of the wider region. In 1840, General Makriyannis, in cooperation with prominent Greek Macedonians from the Kingdom of Greece, organised a clandestine uprising in collaboration with the Greek populations of Yenidje and Eastern Macedonia, aiming at the liberation of the area from Ottoman rule. Despite preparatory efforts, however, the plans for renewed revolutionary action failed to materialise owing to disagreements among the participants.

In 1856, the reformist policy of the Ottoman Empire, enacted under Sultan Abdülmecid I, led to the promulgation of the Ottoman Reform Edict of 1856, which institutionalized the principle of legal equality among Ottoman subjects regardless of religious affiliation. Within this framework, the Christian population of Yenidje appealed to Ecumenical Patriarch of Constantinople Cyril VII to intercede with Abdülmecid in order to obtain permission for the construction of a church in the town. This request was ultimately granted, and in 1858 the Sultan issued a firman explicitly stating:

Upon the arrival of this present imperial decree, let it be known that a petition has been submitted by official document on behalf of the Greek Patriarch of Constantinople and its dependencies, declaring that since my Greek imperial subjects residing in the 'Varos' quarter of the town of Yenice lack a sacred place for the performance of their religious rites, they humbly beseech and implore that my exalted permission be granted to them to build and erect a church.

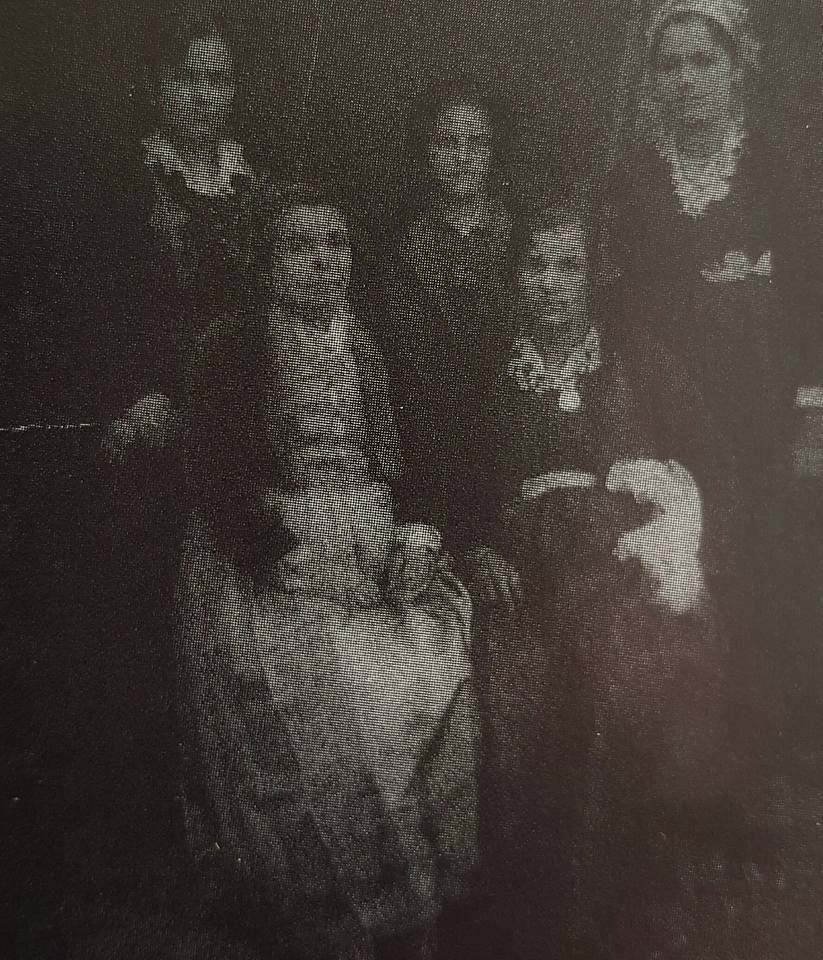
Family photographic portrait in Yenidje, dating to the late 19th century. The image depicts Christian women wearing the local traditional urban costume.

The inhabitants of Yenidje financed the construction entirely with their own resources, while some among them donated plots of land for the church. The building works were undertaken by an Epirote craftsman named Sinas. During the construction process, fanatical Muslim residents reportedly attempted on multiple occasions to halt the project. According to local tradition, they also cut off the water supply to the neighborhood, compelling the Christian population to use wine from their own harvest in the construction of the church. The church was finally inaugurated in 1860, accompanied by the presence of the local Ottoman artillery regiment, and was named after the Dormition of the Theotokos. Alongside the church, the inhabitants of Yenidje also established a new Greek school, intended to serve the primary education needs of children from the town and the surrounding villages.

The construction of the Church of the Dormition of the Theotokos marked the beginning of the gradual expansion and consolidation of the Christian element in Yenidje, a process further reinforced by engagement in commerce and artisanal production. In this manner, a strong Christian urban bourgeoisie emerged, functioning as a principal agent in the promotion of education. Within this context, the 'Greek Orthodox Community of Yenitsa' (Ἑλληνικὴ Ὀρθόδοξος Κοινότης Γενιτσῶν) was organized and administered by five to six demogerontes, who represented the Christian population before the Ottoman kaymakam.

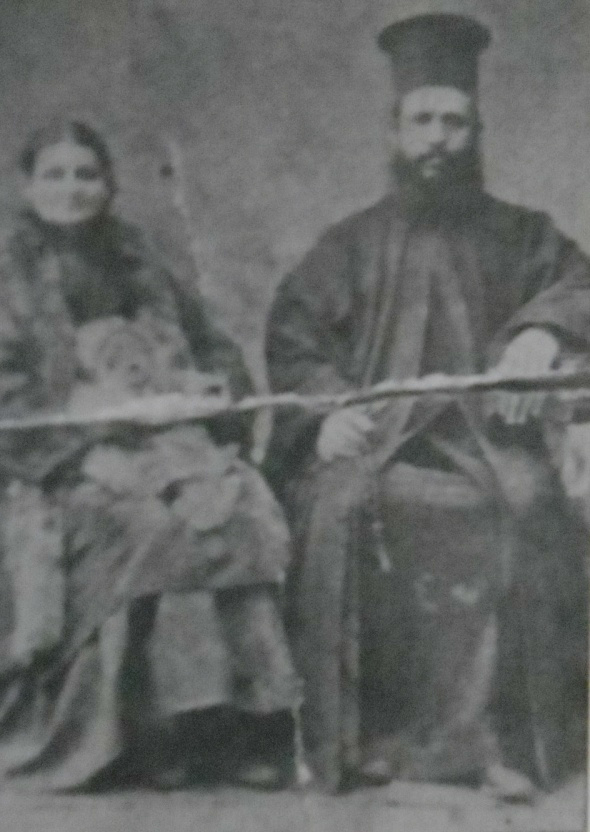
Photograph of the priest Stojan Mokrev with his family in Yenidje, 1890s

In 1862, Catholic missionaries from the French Lazarist Order of Saint Vincent de Paul of Selanik arrived in Yenidje, introducing Uniatism and forming an initial nucleus of adherents. The leader of the Uniate community was a local priest known as Papa-Dimos, and subsequently his son-in-law, the priest Stojan Mokrev from Kilkis. By virtue of a sultanic firman, the Uniates of Yenidje were granted permission to erect a place of worship, the Catholic Church of Saints Peter and Paul. This initiative, however, proved to be short-lived, as by 1866 the majority of the Uniates had returned to Orthodoxy, and the number of Uniate families had declined to no more than ten.

Nevertheless, religious tensions were reignited with the establishment of the Bulgarian Exarchate in 1870. Bulgarian Exarchist priests arrived in Yenidje and incorporated approximately forty inhabitants into the schism. The remaining urban population, as well as the rural population of the surrounding countryside, responded to the Exarchate with suspicion and rejection, remaining loyal to the Greek Patriarchate. Consequently, when the Exarchate convened its assembly in Constantinople in 1871 with representatives from the cities of Macedonia, Yenidje was not represented.

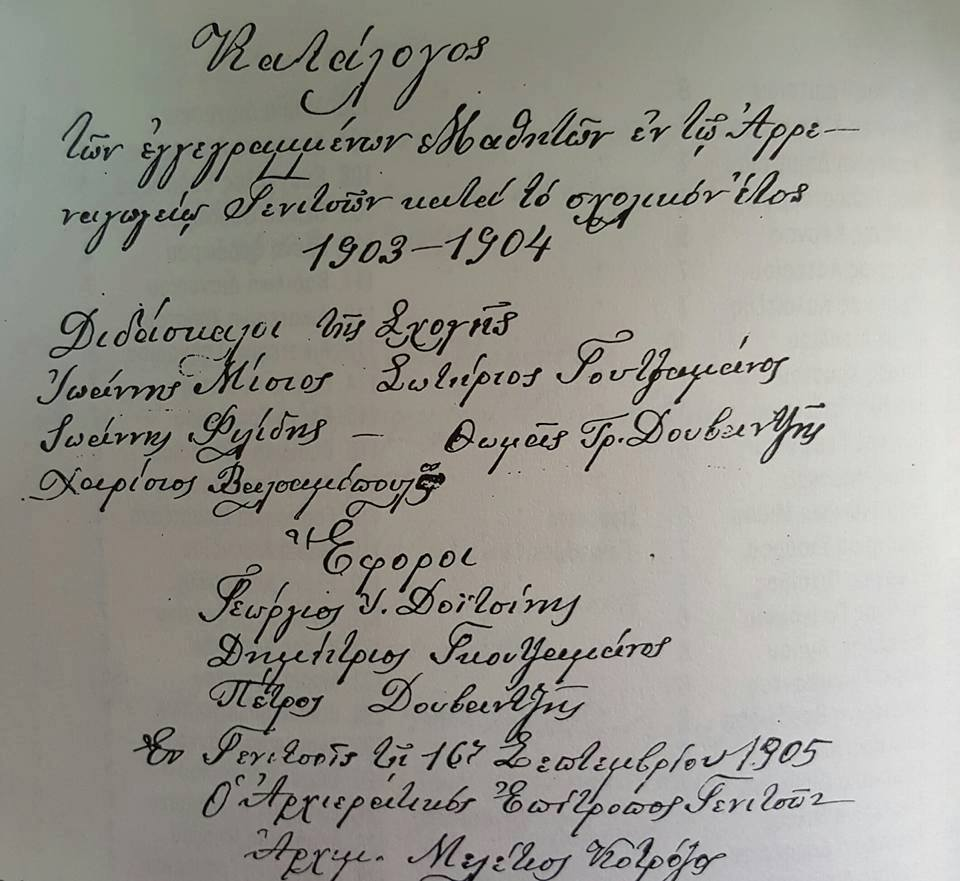
Register of teachers of the Greek boys' school of Yenitsa, together with its school trustees, 1903–1904

In this year, increased attention was devoted to the educational and spiritual formation of Greek children from Yenidje. Four Greek educational institutions were established: a secondary school, a primary school, a girls' school and a kindergarten, while a boys' school was founded at a later stage. The teaching staff, consisting of both local educators and teachers from other regions, were remunerated by the community. The educational institutions were financed through church revenues, derived from income generated by shops, plots of land, rental properties, and a kishla (winter pasture) owned by the church. In 1872, the Greek Philological and Educational Association of Yenitsa 'Pella', was founded. Among its principal responsibilities was the supervision and smooth operation of the schools in the town as well as those in the villages of the wider district.

During this period, Megleno-Romanians and Epirote Vlachs also settled in the town and became integrated into the Christian community. The continuous influx of inhabitants from the surrounding villages into the town ultimately led, by the end of the 19th century, to the formation of five distinct Christian quarters: Varosi or Epano Mahalas (Upper Quarter), Boutsava, Tzoumra, Kato Mahalas (Lower Quarter), and Poroi.

According to the Ottoman general census of 1881/1882–1893, the district of Yenidje had a total population of 42,209, consisting of 22,573 Muslims, 18,155 Greeks, 1,368 Bulgarians, and 573 Jews.

==== English travelers in Yenidje ====
In 1835, the English traveler William Martin Leake published, in four volumes, his written impressions of the journeys he undertook between 1804 and 1807 in Central Greece, Thessaly, Epirus, Macedonia, and the islands of the Aegean, under the title Travels in Northern Greece. His itinerary through Macedonia included the town of Giannitsa, which he visited in November 1806. Leake's work constitutes a valuable source for the study of Giannitsa in the early nineteenth century.

After traveling from Thessaloniki to the archaeological site of Pella via the bridge of the Vardar River, Leake visited Giannitsa. Having first informed the reader about the etymology of the town's name, he remarked on its evident decline, which he considered striking. He then devoted an entire page to the local economy, which was based primarily on agricultural production, with cereals, cotton, and tobacco as its principal products. Tobacco underwent a particular processing procedure before being exported to other regions of the Ottoman Empire, where it was renowned for its aroma. Economic activity was controlled and administered by the Bey of Giannitsa, Abdurrahman, who also owned the largest tract of land in the area. Leake further referred to the mountain range that "protected" the urban landscape from the north—Mount Paiko—characterized by its extensive chestnut forests. On the following day, he walked through the streets and cemeteries of Giannitsa, where he observed numerous remains of ancient Greek antiquity.

==== Macedonian Struggle ====
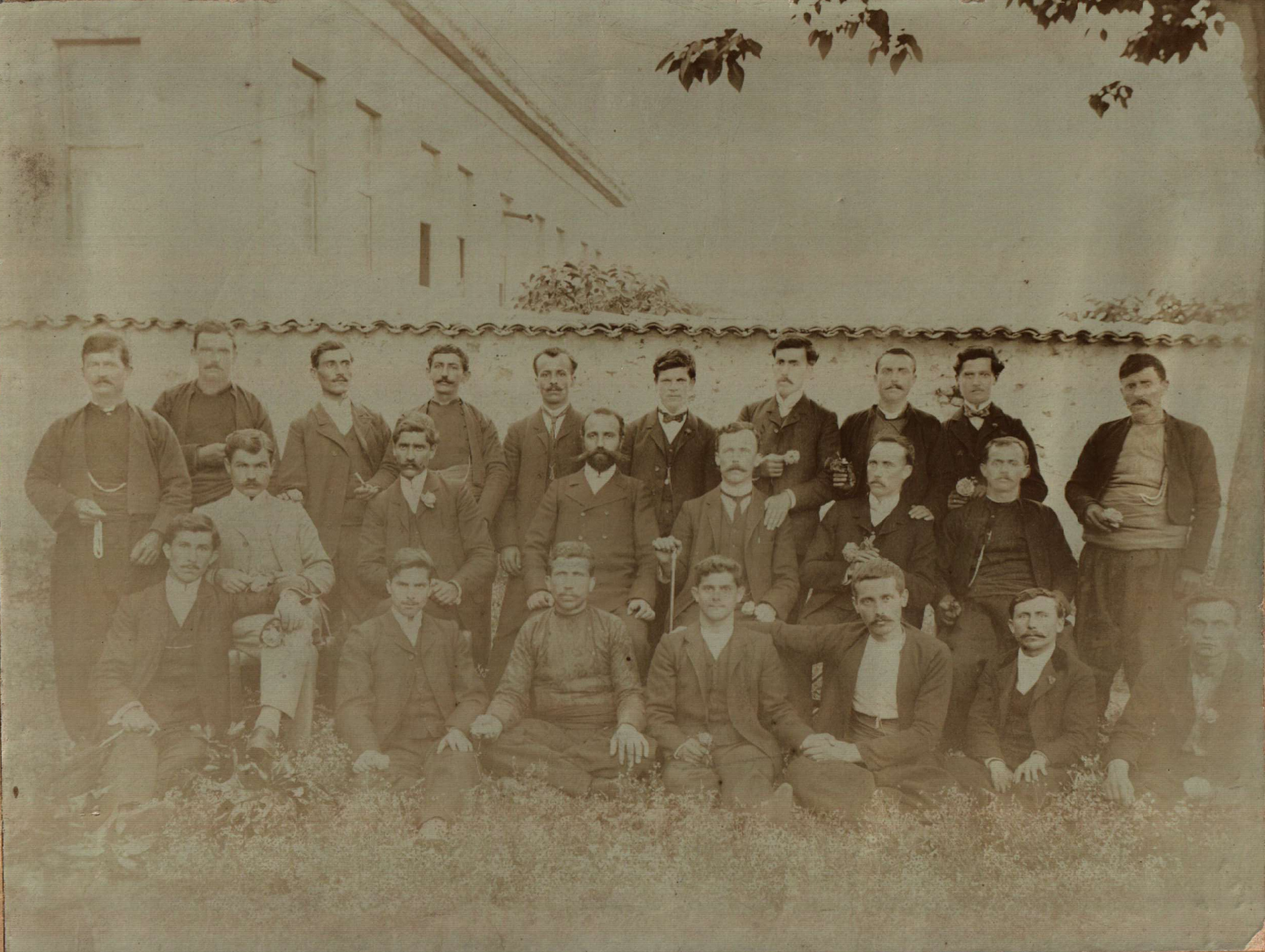
Bulgarian revolutionary committee in Yenice-i Vardar, 11 May 1906

In the early 20th century, Giannitsa became a battleground in the Macedonian Struggle. This multi-sided guerilla war was the result of dissatisfaction with Ottoman rule as well as the schismatic conflict within the Orthodox Christian community, seeing the Bulgarian Exarchate against the Greek Patriarch of Constantinople. Giannitsa quickly became an epicentre of violence due to its diverse ethnic character and strategic importance, with strong Greek and Bulgarian committees, and significant Ottoman Army and government presence. The Greeks of Giannitsa became heavily targeted by the Bulgarian komitadjis who would operate from within the swamp before the Greek Makedonomachoi could take control. These years were also marred with the high-profile murders of the Giannitsa Greek Defense Committee leadership. These murders included chairman Antonios Kasapis (1904; his daughter also murdered in 1903), treasurer Christos Didaskalou (1907), and secretary Dimitrios Oikonomou (1909). There were also many murders of lower level Greek Committee members, including Dionysios Samoladas (1904), Christos Hatzidimitriou (17 July 1905; in the market square), Aristeidis Douvantzis and Dionysios Tsakmakis (1905), Ioannis Karabatakis and his niece (1906), Stavros Mitzouris (1906), Athanasios Oikonomou (1906), and Athanasios Organtzis (1906).

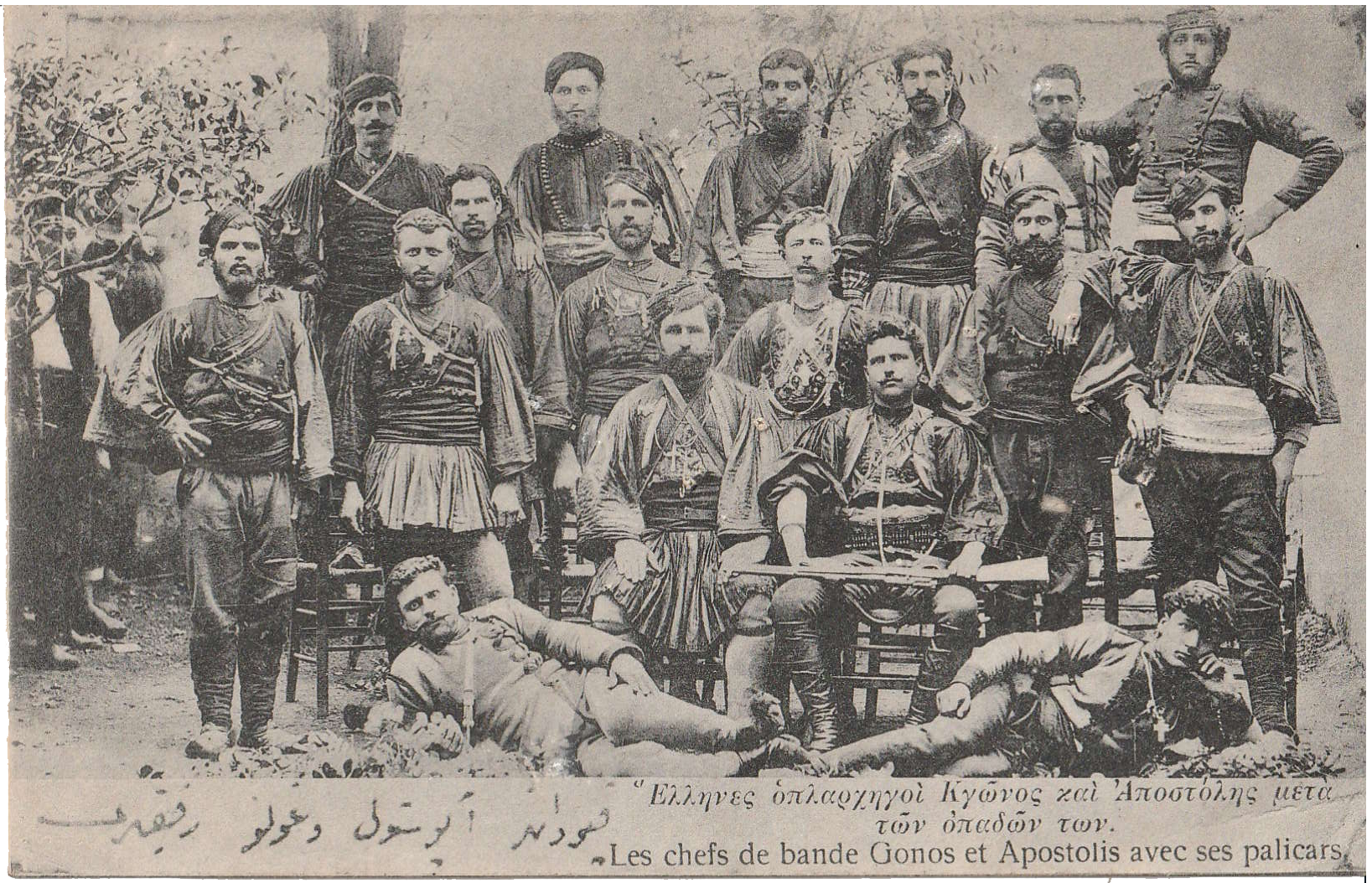
Gonos Yiotas and his armed band

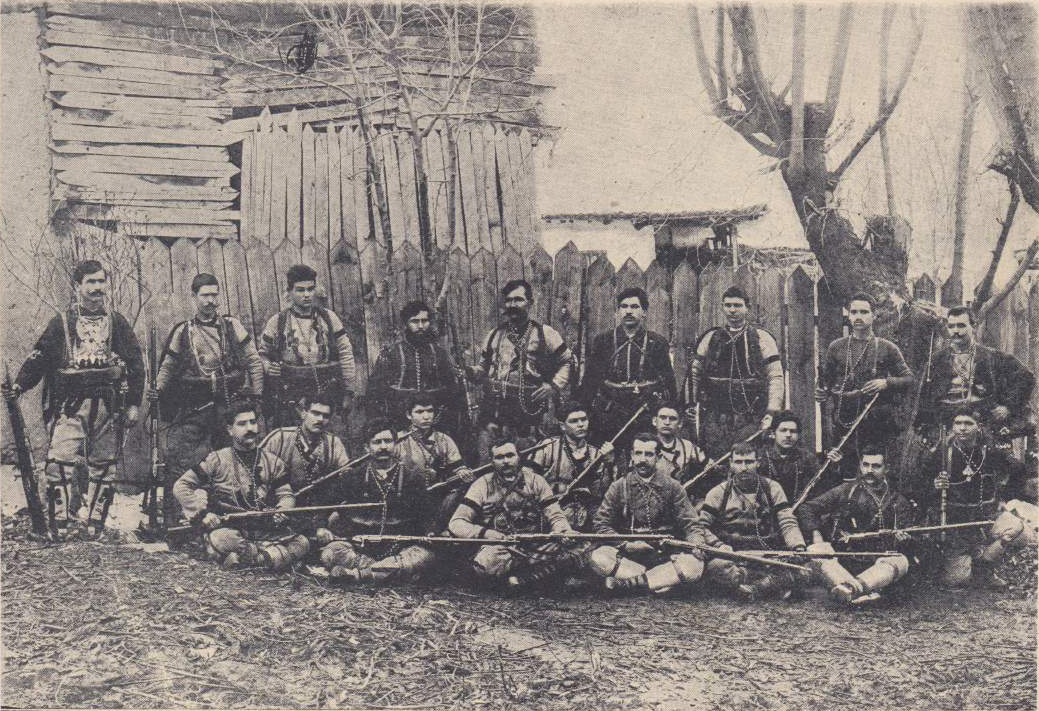
Apostol Petkov and his cheta

Cousins Gonos Yiotas and Apostol Petkov were among the most well known guerilla leaders of the Giannitsa area, each fighting for an opposing faction. Yiotas was a Greek Patriarchist who once fought the Turks alongside Petkov as a komitadji under the Internal Macedonian Revolutionary Organization during the Ilinden Uprising, though he broke ranks soon after due to IMRO's violence against Greek civilians. He joined the Greek efforts as soon as they began to organize and was instrumental in protecting the Greek population and maintaining the influence of the Greek Patriarchate. Yiotas was such an effective guerilla fighter in the swamp around Giannitsa that he earned the nickname 'Ghost of the Lake'. Apostol Petkov remained in the service of IMRO and continued his violent means of spreading the influence of the Bulgarian Exarchate, erecting a gallows in Giannitsa to spread fear among the Greek population. Both Gonos Yiotas and Apostol Petkov would meet their deaths due to betrayal in 1911, and both would be laid to rest in Giannitsa. The Young Turk Revolution of 1908 brought about new hopes in Giannitsa and the surrounding region with new promises of equality and freedoms. The Young Turks amnestied all combatants of the Macedonian Struggle if they were to cease activity and turn in their arms. Many obeyed, but violence soon returned after the Young Turks' promises fell flat, though this time not as intense as before.

Penelope Delta's novel Secrets of the Swamp (referring to the shores of Giannitsa Lake) is a romanticised account of this from the Greek point of view.

=== Battle of Yenidje ===
By late 1912, when the First Balkan War broke out, Yenice-i Vardar was still very much an Ottoman town, both in administration and in character. The town had continuously been ruled by the descendants of Gazi Evrenos, with Emin Bey being the final Ottoman ruler (kaymakam), living with his family in a neoclassical mansion in the town centre.

Following the failure to halt the advance of the Greek forces at the Sarantaporo Pass, the Ottoman army, under the command of Hasan Tahsin Pasha, withdrew and reorganized in the area of Yenice-i Vardar, a location of considerable strategic importance. The low elevations surrounding the town, combined with its proximity to the lake, offered significant defensive advantages, which explains the decision of the Ottoman command to establish its principal defensive line in this area. On 19 October 1912, a force of approximately 25,000 Ottoman troops, supported by thirty artillery pieces, confronted five Greek divisions under the overall command of Crown Prince Constantine of Greece. The main engagement took place at the crossing of the Balitza stream, under extremely adverse weather conditions, as torrential rainfall severely hampered the operations of both sides and resulted in substantial casualties. Nevertheless, both forces displayed strong determination: the Greek army sought the liberation of the region, perceived as historically integral to Hellenic Macedonia, while the Ottoman forces aimed to prevent the enemy’s entry into a city regarded as religiously and strategically significant.

At the same time, conditions within the town were marked by profound insecurity and panic, as the outcome of the battle remained uncertain. The Ottoman authorities arrested the kodjabashis of the Greek community, reportedly with the intention of carrying out executions, a development that intensified fear among the inhabitants, many of whom sought refuge in churches. Furthermore, in an apparent attempt to prevent the city’s easy surrender, fires were set, resulting in the outbreak of an urban conflagration. Meanwhile, 74 men of Yenice-i Vardar's Bulgarian community enlisted in the Macedonian-Adrianopolitan Volunteer Corps of the Bulgarian Army on the onset of war.

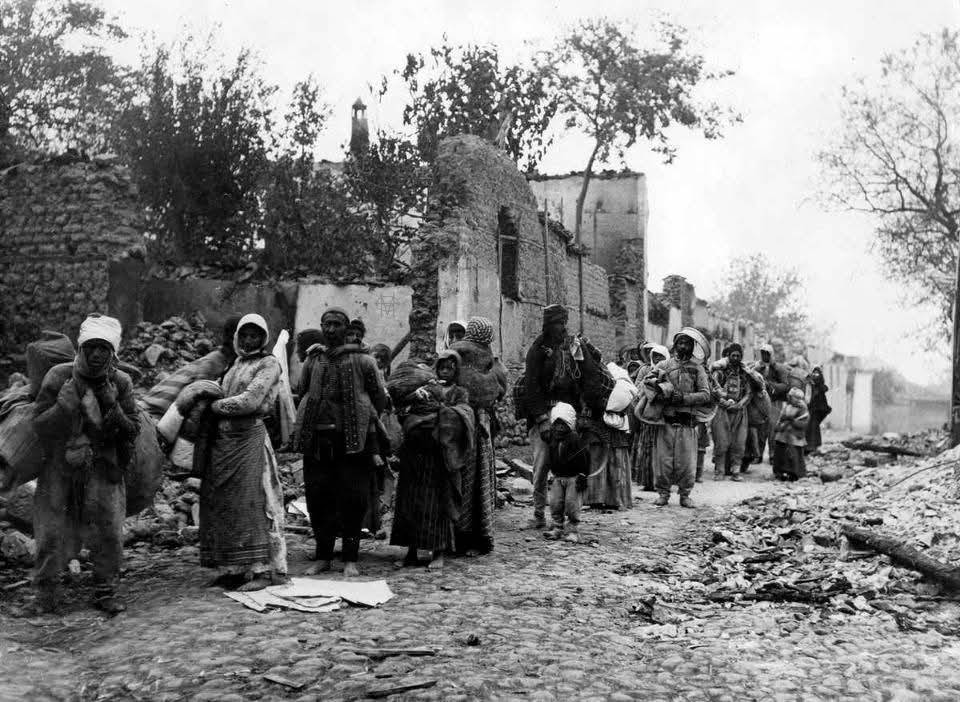
Photograph depicting Turkish civilian inhabitants of Giannitsa evacuating the town in the aftermath of the battle.

Ultimately, the Greek forces succeeded in outflanking the Ottoman positions, and by the morning of 20 October 1912 the Ottoman defensive line had collapsed entirely. This development opened the way for the advance toward Thessaloniki and marked the neutralization of the last organized Ottoman resistance in Central Macedonia. The army of Hasan Tahsin Pasha retreated in disorder toward Thessaloniki, while extensive destruction occurred in the Muslim quarters of the town, leading to the mass flight of the Ottoman population.

The departure of the kaymakam Emin Bey signified the formal end of Ottoman authority in the region, bringing to a close nearly six centuries of Ottoman rule. The entry of Crown Prince Constantine into Giannitsa took place amid expressions of enthusiasm by the local Greek population. Medical assistance was provided to wounded soldiers, a solemn doxological service was conducted in the metropolitan church, and the fallen were buried following their preparation by local women. The Battle of Yenidje ranks among the most intense engagements of the Balkan Wars and is widely regarded as decisive for the geopolitical reconfiguration of the Greek state, as it directly facilitated the entry of Greek troops into Thessaloniki.

=== Interwar period ===
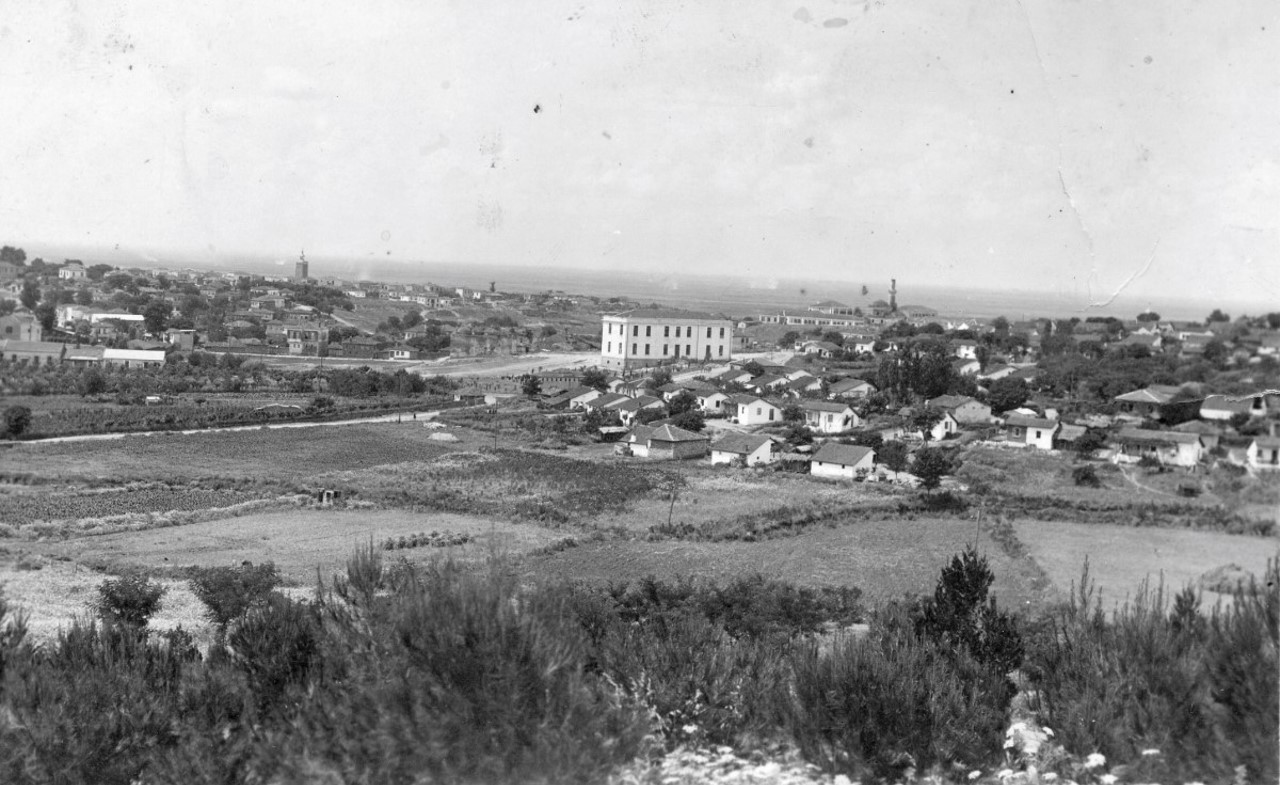
A panoramical view of Giannitsa in a photograph dated 1924.

A decisive factor in shaping the economic and social identity of Giannitsa was the drainage of the lake in 1928-1932, which led to the transformation of extensive previously barren areas into productive agricultural land. This development contributed significantly to the increase in agricultural output, the attraction of capital, and the settlement of a labor force in the region. At the same time, the resettlement of refugee populations following the Asia Minor Catastrophe and the Greco-Turkish Population Exchange brought about substantial demographic and urban transformations in the city’s fabric. The remaining Muslim population was relocated to Turkey, while their neighborhoods were occupied by Asia Minor Greek refugees, who settled in the former Ottoman quarters. The newly arrived populations originated from Istanbul, Izmir, the Sea of Marmara region, Strandzha, Madytus, Cilicia, Derinkuyu, Kayseri and Niğde. In addition, a considerable number of Pontics arrived from Trabzon, Gümüşhane, and Bafra, while at a later stage Eastern Rumelian settlers from the Topolovgrad area also reached the city. The smooth and effective integration of refugees and the local population played a decisive role in the rapid economic development of Giannitsa and its gradual emergence as a modern and dynamic urban center. In 1924, Menelaos Lountemis offered a vivid literary description of Giannitsa:

A second, small, fairy-tale character, seven-hilled town, with its cobbled streets and its mosques that look like palaces, with their tall minarets. Looking at its large size, one would think it had 60,000–70,000 inhabitants. You get exhausted walking from the old market to the new settlement of refugees from Bulgaria. And yet, it has only a few thousand residents. The central and best part of the town is the Haznés, a makeshift crossroads of this small seven-hilled town. Many of its institutions and public works show that it is not neglected by the municipality. The town is not very busy. Its elite is large and distinguished. Overall, it is a good provincial agricultural town.

=== German occupation ===
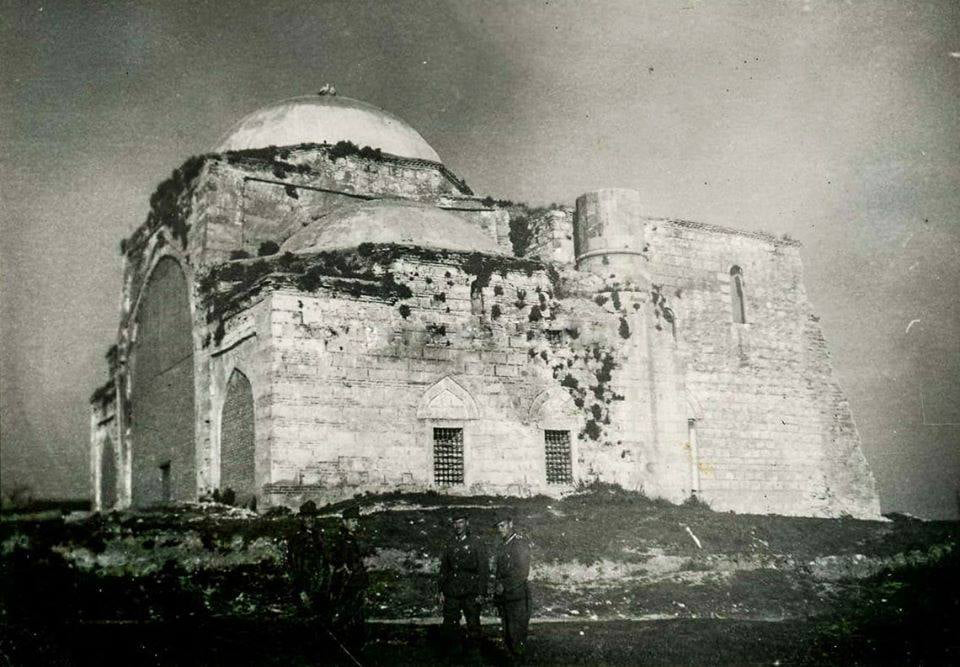
German soldiers by the Iskender Bey Mosque, 1942–1943

The German army invaded Giannitsa on 11 April 1941. On 20 April 1941, some Austrian forces arrived. The municipal registry of Giannitsa confirms four random killings in various parts of the city. On 16 September 1943, the Municipality of Giannitsa, headed by the Mayor Thomas Magriotis, and the help of local soccer teams, organized a demonstration in the city against the intention of the Germans to surrender Central Macedonia to the Bulgarians. According to oral testimony, on 13 November 1943, the Germans arrested around 50 people, whom they transferred to the camp of "Pavlos Melas" at Thessaloniki, and they killed thirteen. At the same time, the Germans invaded for the first time the village Eleftherohori 7 km (4 mi) away from the city. In this attack, there were no casualties. On 23 March 1944, the village was burned, and the place deserted. Eleftherohori lost 19 lives.

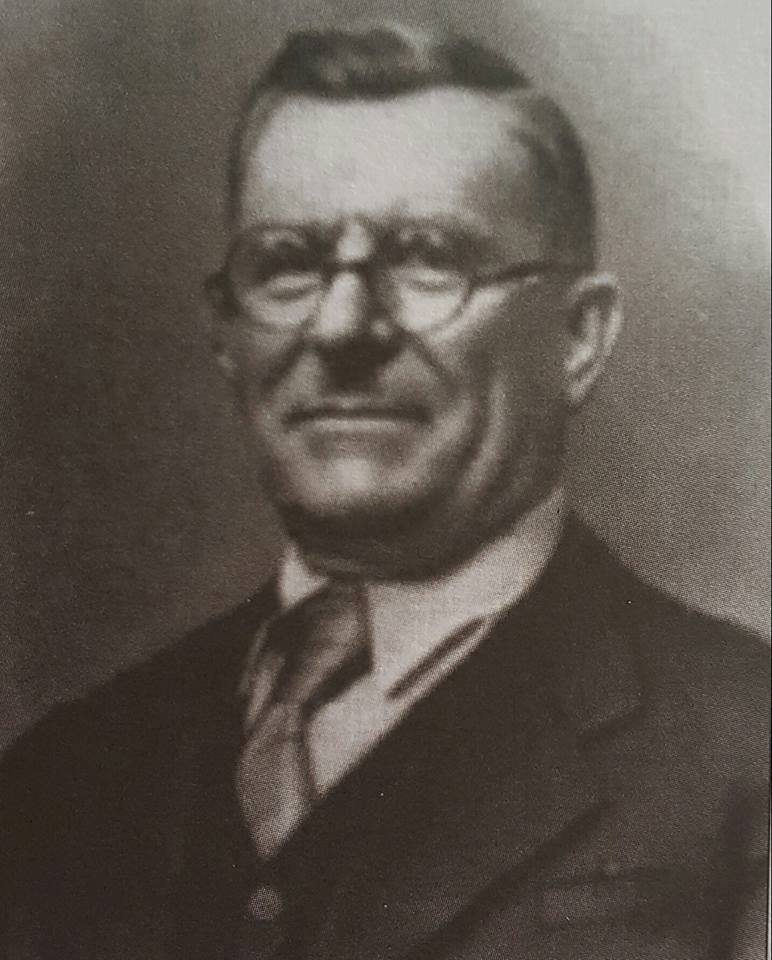
Photographic portrait of Thomas Mangriotis

On 5 August 1944, the Austrian soldier Otmar Dorne left the German occupation army and joined the 30th Constitution of the ELAS, based in Mount Paiko. The defection of Dorne, and the presence of the Wehrmacht sergeant Schubert, led to mass reprisals on 14 September 1944 in Giannitsa: about 120 residents were executed by forces of the Jagdkommando Schubert with the collaboration of Georgios Poulos. Among those executed was the Mayor, Thomas Mangriotis. The Swedish ambassador, Timberg, indicated that one third of the city was destroyed by fire. The citizens left the city. Emile Wenger visited Giannitsa a few days after the mass execution, as a representative of the International Red Cross, and wrote "Giannitsa is already a dead city". On 20 September 1944, a citizens' committee sent a message to the National Government stating the facts and asking for weapons. The Germans left Giannitsa on 3 November 1944.

During this period, the little amount of Bulgarian citizens that had remained, collaborated with the German occupiers and was permitted to form an irredentist 'action committee' and later Central Bulgarian-Macedonian Committee, headed by the local citizen Georgi Kayafov. After these years, they migrated to Bulgaria.

=== Modern Period ===
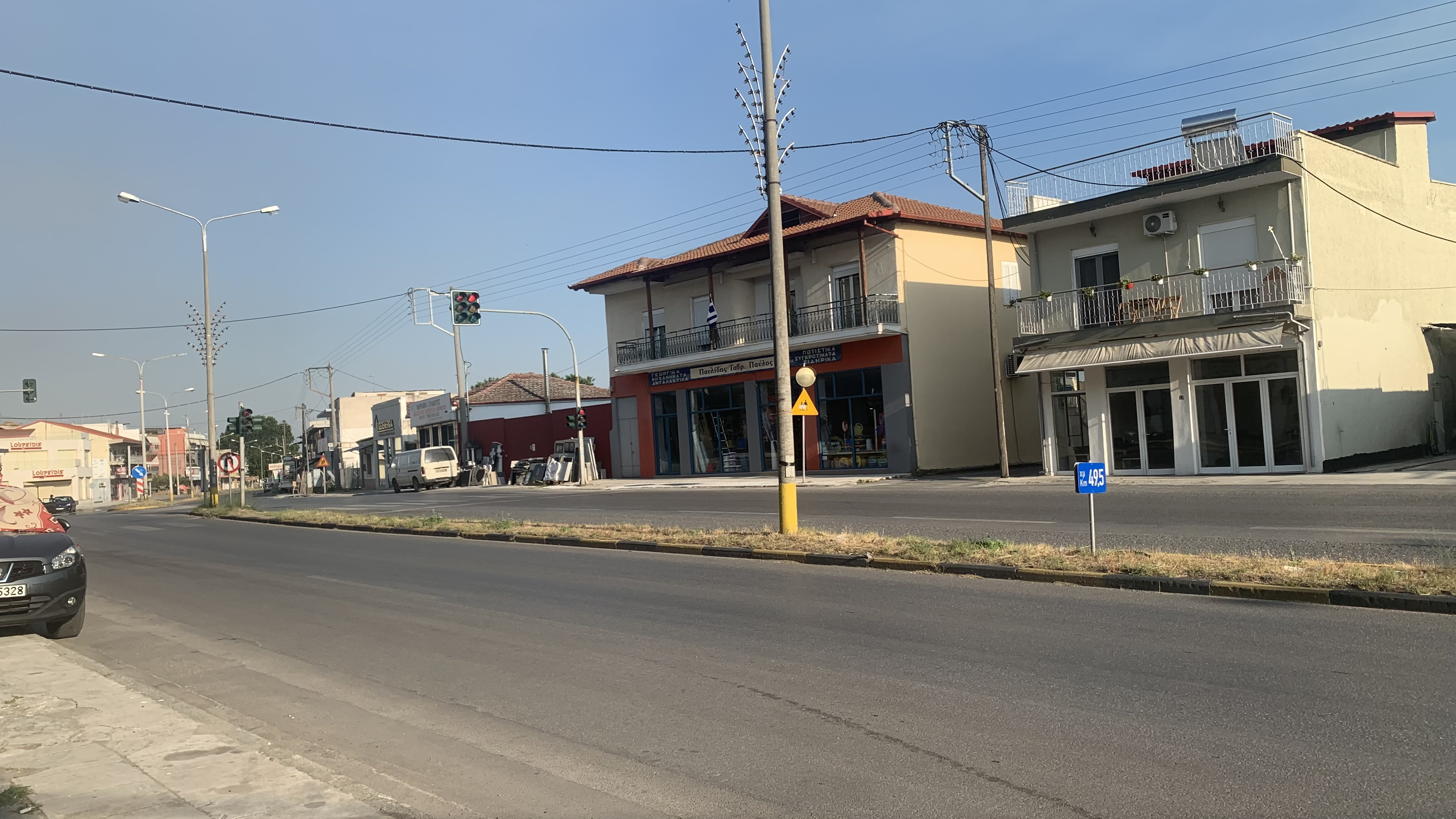
The "Palia Agora" (Old Market) district, the successor to the former Ottoman commercial center, which constitutes the industrial and commercial core of the town.

After German occupation and the Greek Civil War, Giannitsa acquired a predominantly Greek demographic and cultural character. This transformation marked a departure from the structures and social frameworks associated with the Ottoman period. The town subsequently experienced industrial and economic development, with the establishment of numerous enterprises, workshops, and commercial establishments. Its geographical proximity to Thessaloniki further facilitated technological advancement and economic integration into wider regional networks. Owing to the cultivation of the fertile plain surrounding the town, Giannitsa did not experience prolonged periods of economic collapse. Nevertheless, the broader fiscal instability of the Greek state prompted significant outward migration, with many inhabitants relocating abroad, particularly to the United States and Australia.

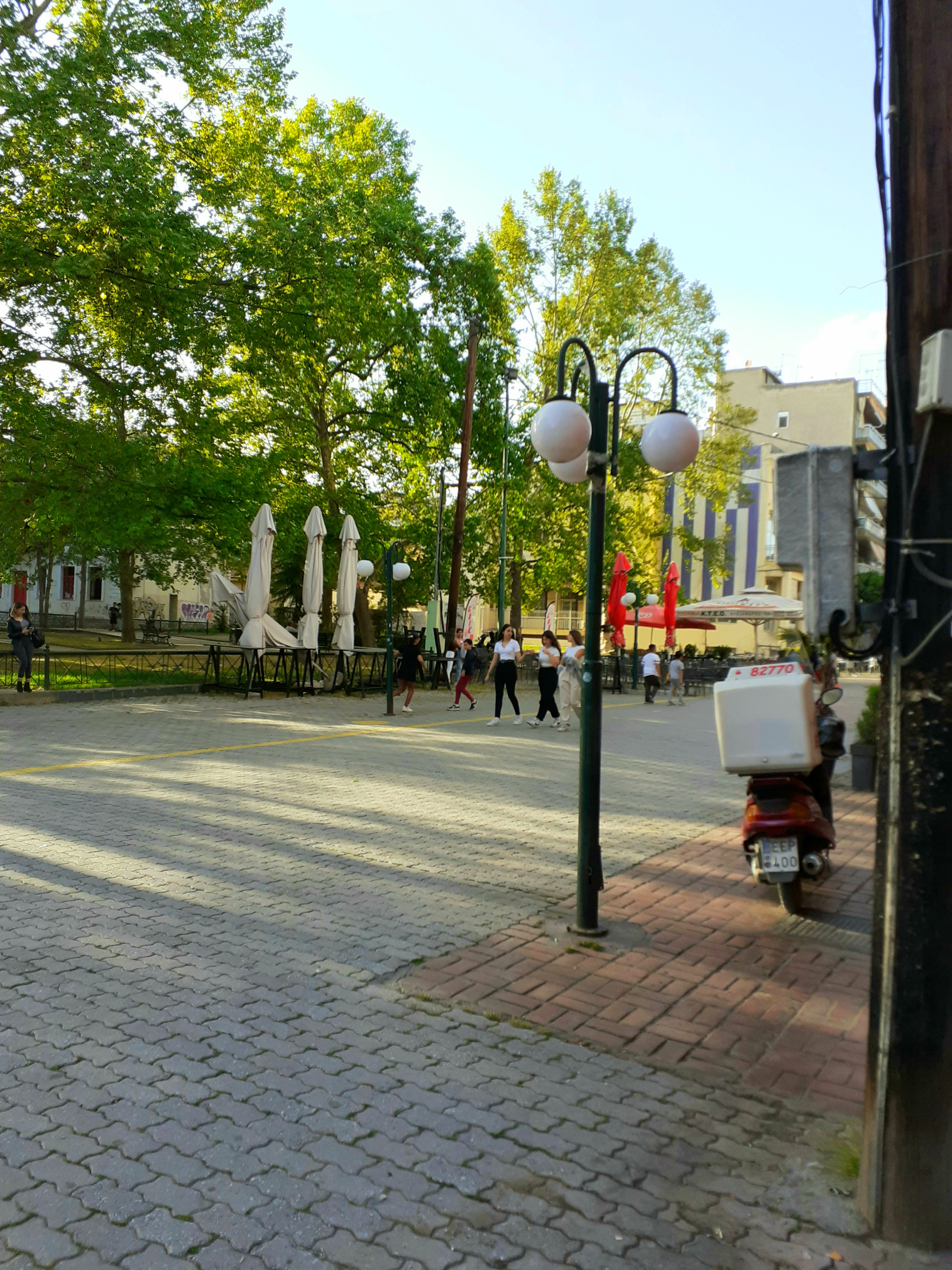
The central pedestrian thoroughfare, which constitutes the most heavily frequented and widely utilized street in the town.

During the 1960s and 1970s, extensive demolition of older residential buildings took place in order to accommodate the construction of modern apartment blocks. This process resulted in the disappearance of a substantial portion of the town’s original Ottoman-era architectural fabric, which had characterized both Muslim and Christian residences of urban and rustic style. At the same time, schools were constructed, cultural associations were founded with the aim of preserving local cultural heritage, and a series of initiatives were undertaken to protect the surrounding natural environment. The annual commercial fair continued to operate, attracting visitors from neighboring regions and contributing to the strengthening of the local economy.

Today, Giannitsa has developed into a contemporary urban center which, while aligned with modern technological and social practices, retains elements of traditional character, including customs, social practices, and cultural expressions rooted in earlier historical periods. At the same time, efforts are being undertaken to preserve local historical monuments, with the aim of promoting the region’s history at an international level and fostering sustainable tourism development.

== Landmarks ==
=== Historical monuments ===
Given the importance of Giannitsa in the Ottoman era, many structures of the period still stand and have been declared historical monuments by the Greek Archaeological Service. These monuments include:

- Baths of Evrenos, c. 1385–1395
- Mausoleum of Gazi Evrenos, 1417
- Mausoleum of Ahmet Bey, c. 15th century
- Yakup Bey Mosque, now St. Paraskevi Church, c. 15th century
- Ahmet Bey Mosque, c. 15th century
- Iskender Bey Mosque, c. 1481–1512
- Ottoman Market Building, c. 16th to 17th century
- Ottoman Clock Tower, 1668
- House of Emin Bey, c. 1900–1910
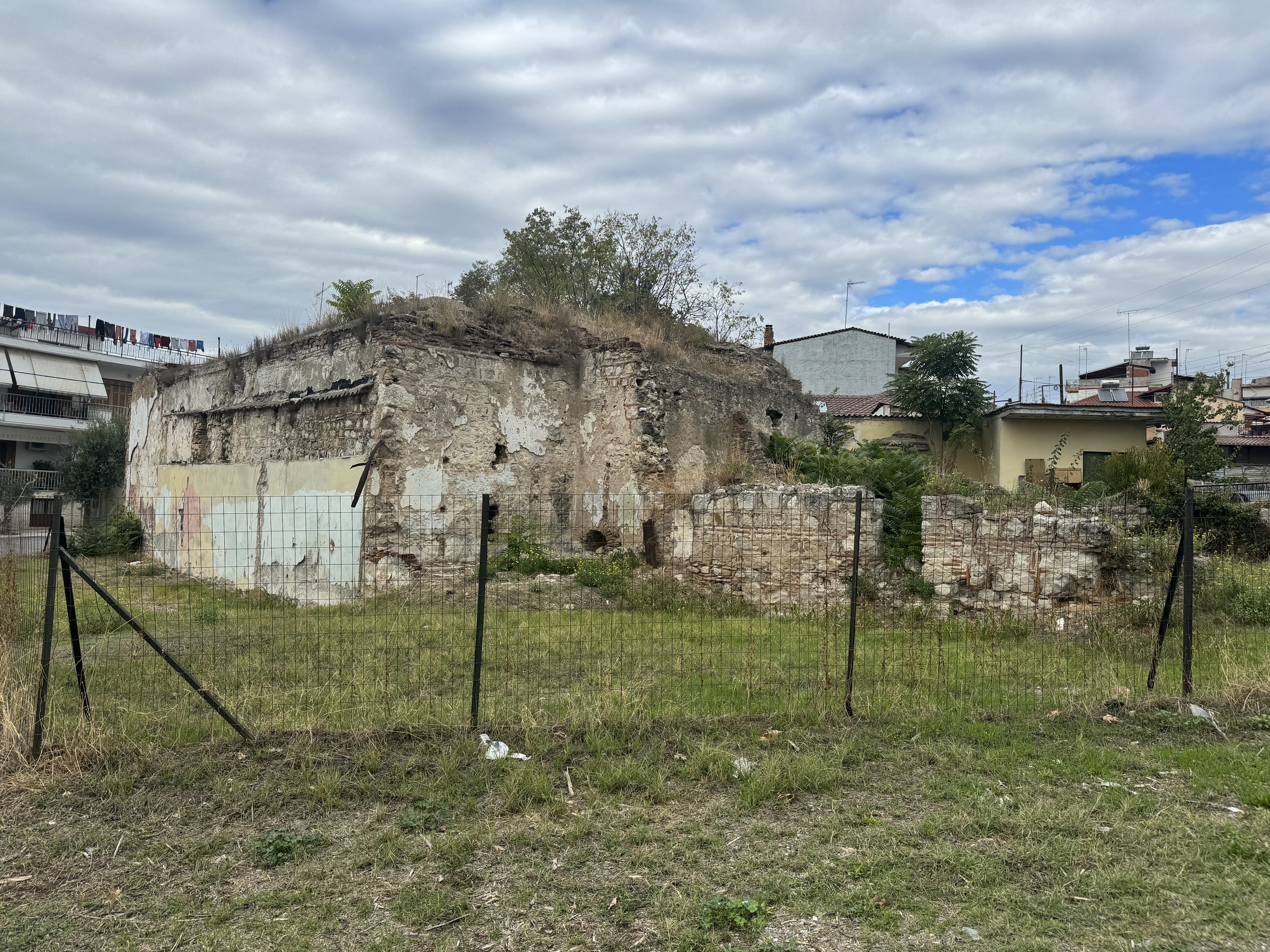
Baths of Evrenos

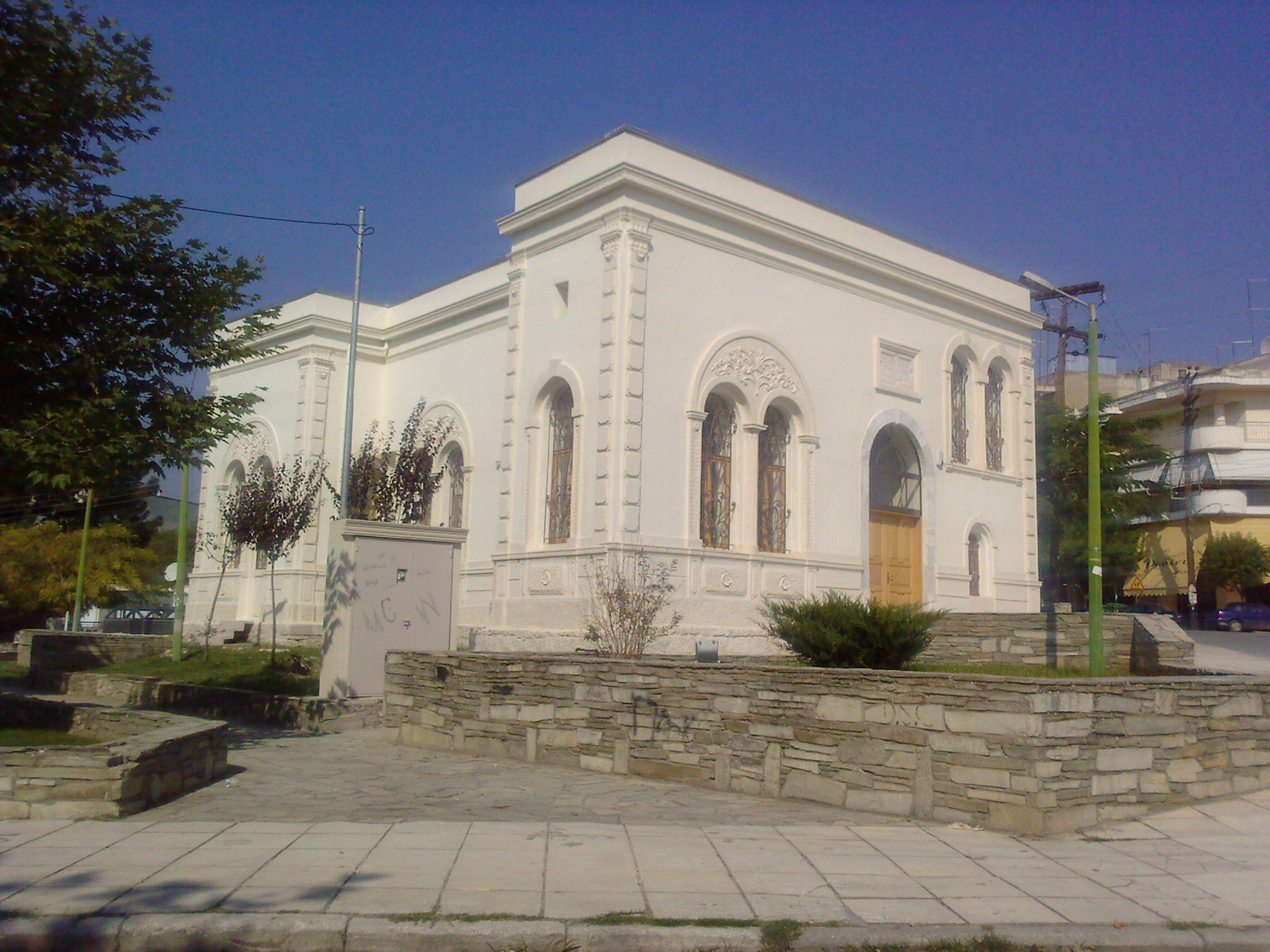
Mausoleum of Gazi Evrenos

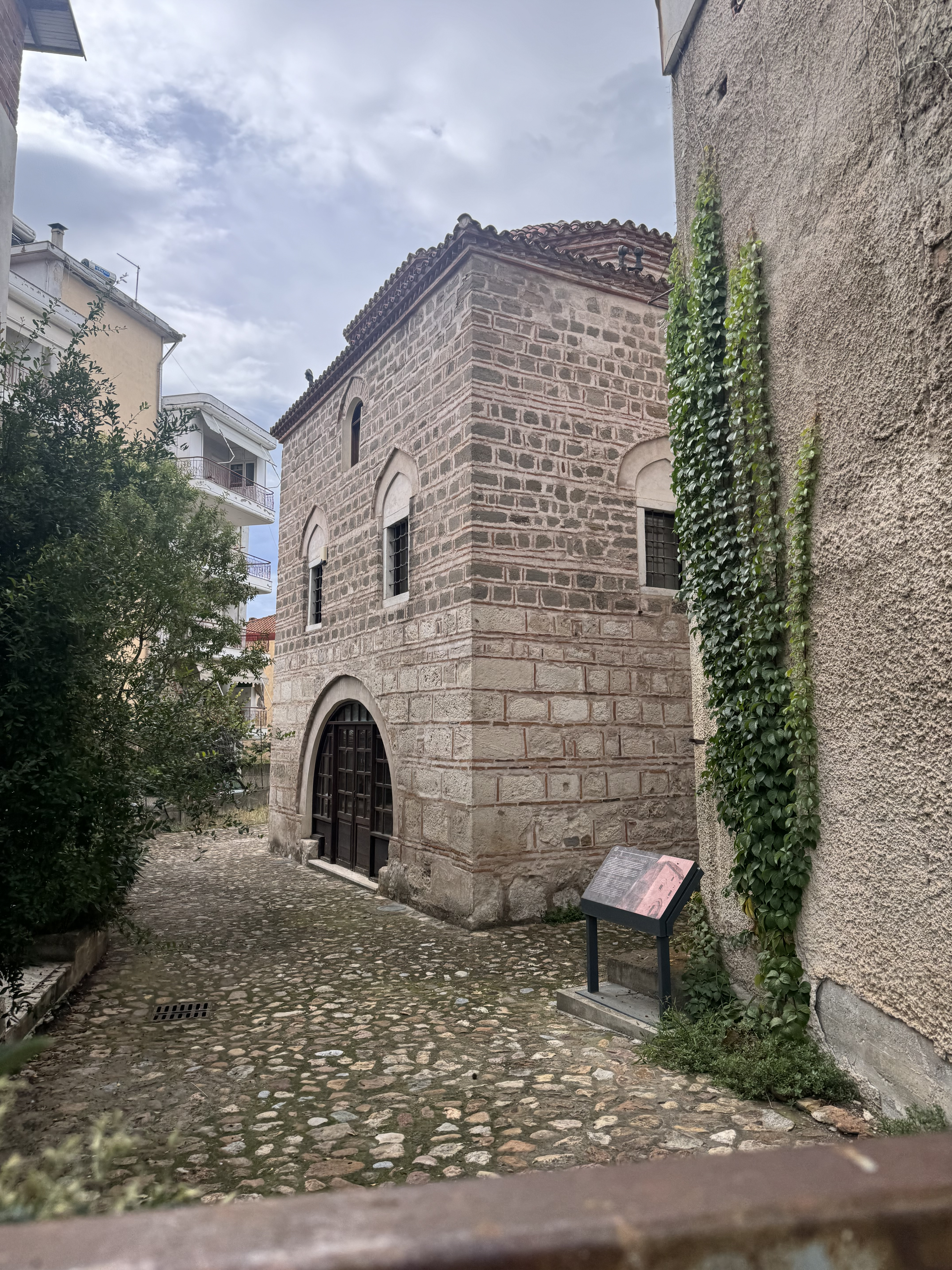
Mausoleum of Ahmet Bey

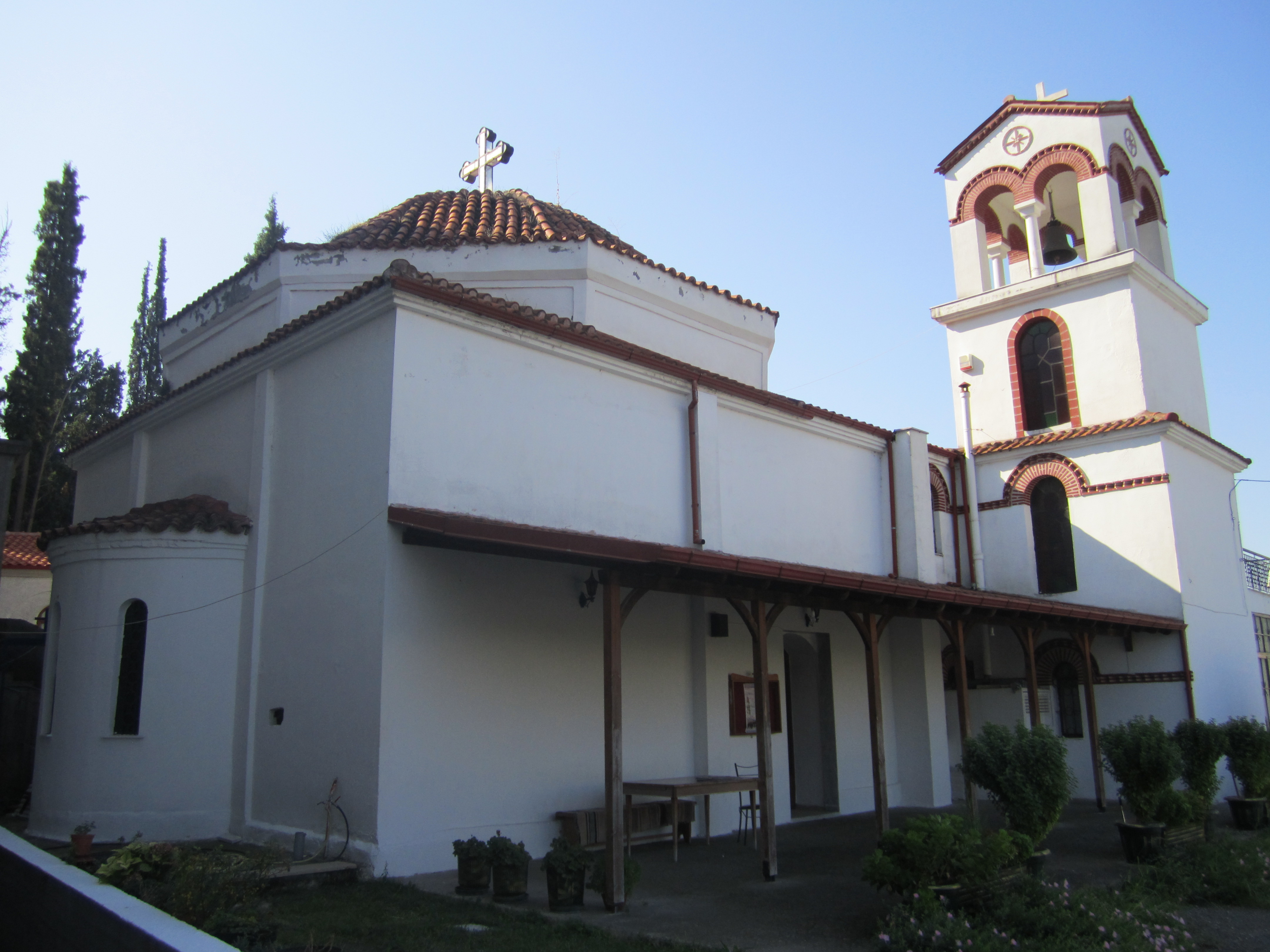
Yakup Bey Mosque, now St. Paraskevi Church

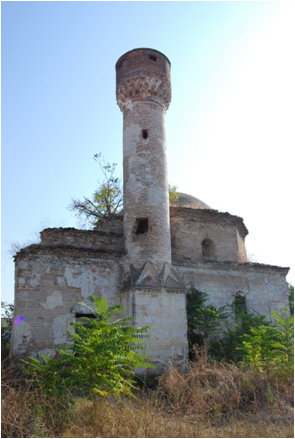
Ahmet Bey Mosque

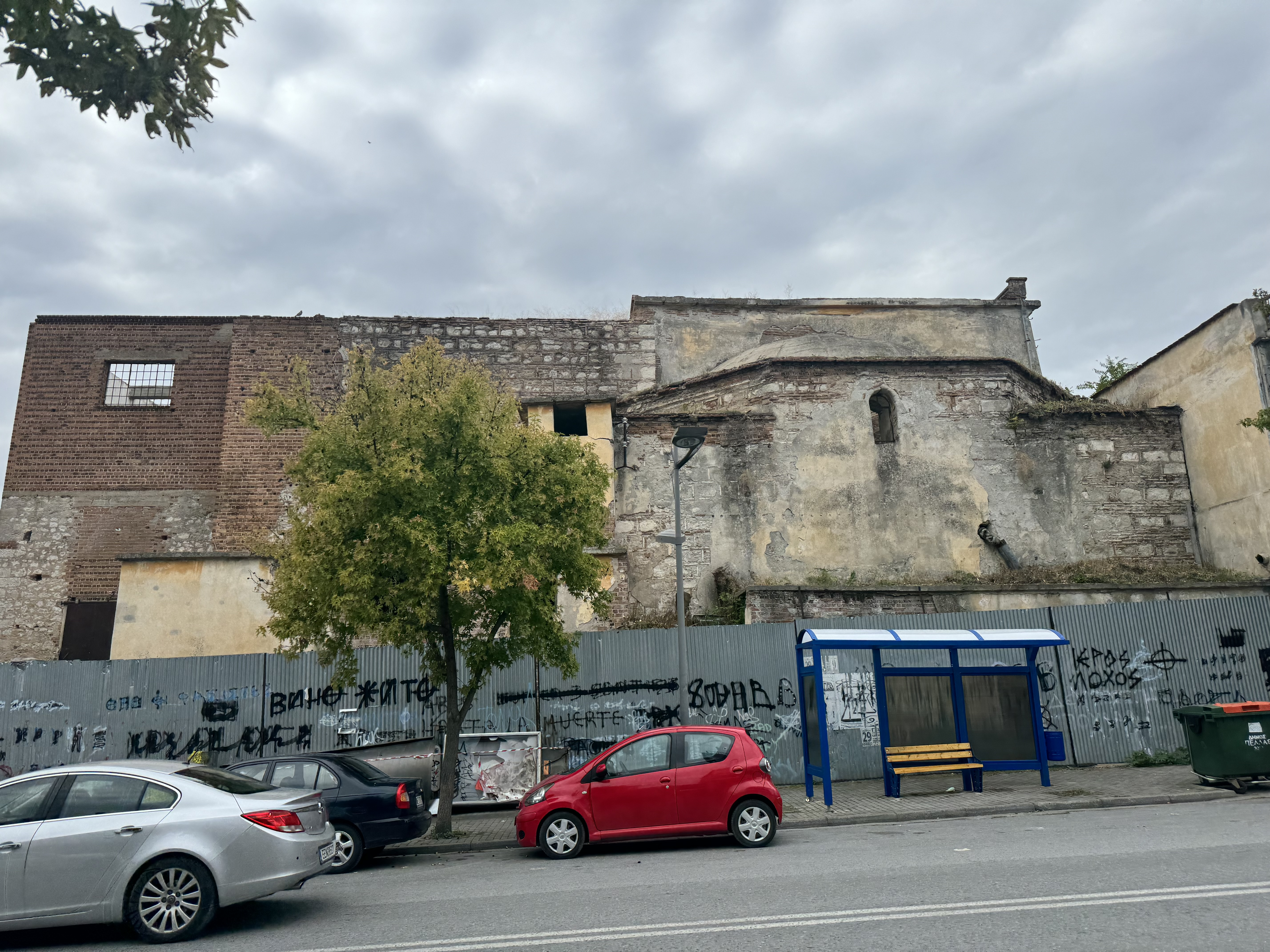
Side view of Iskender Bey Mosque

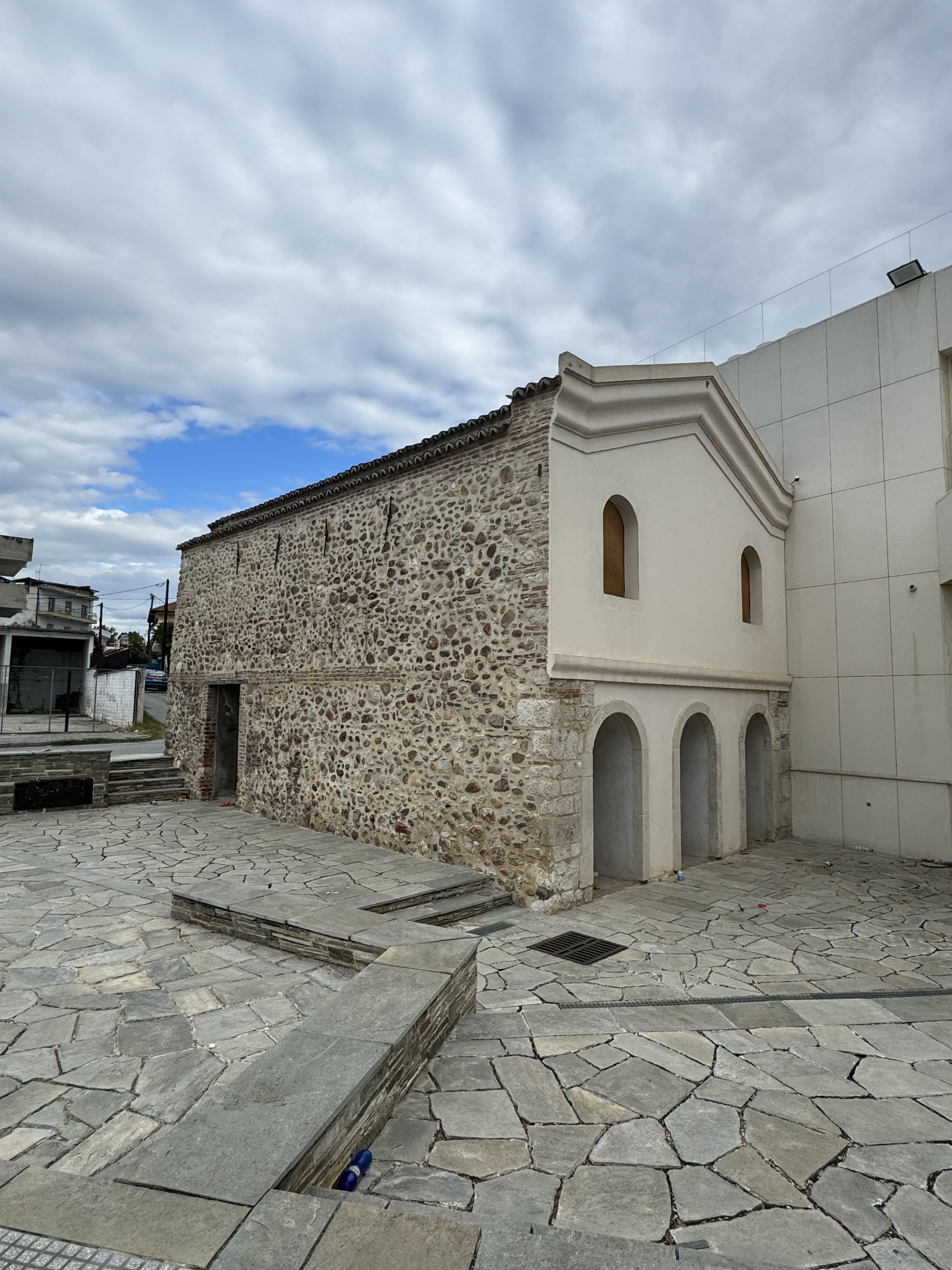
Ottoman Market Building

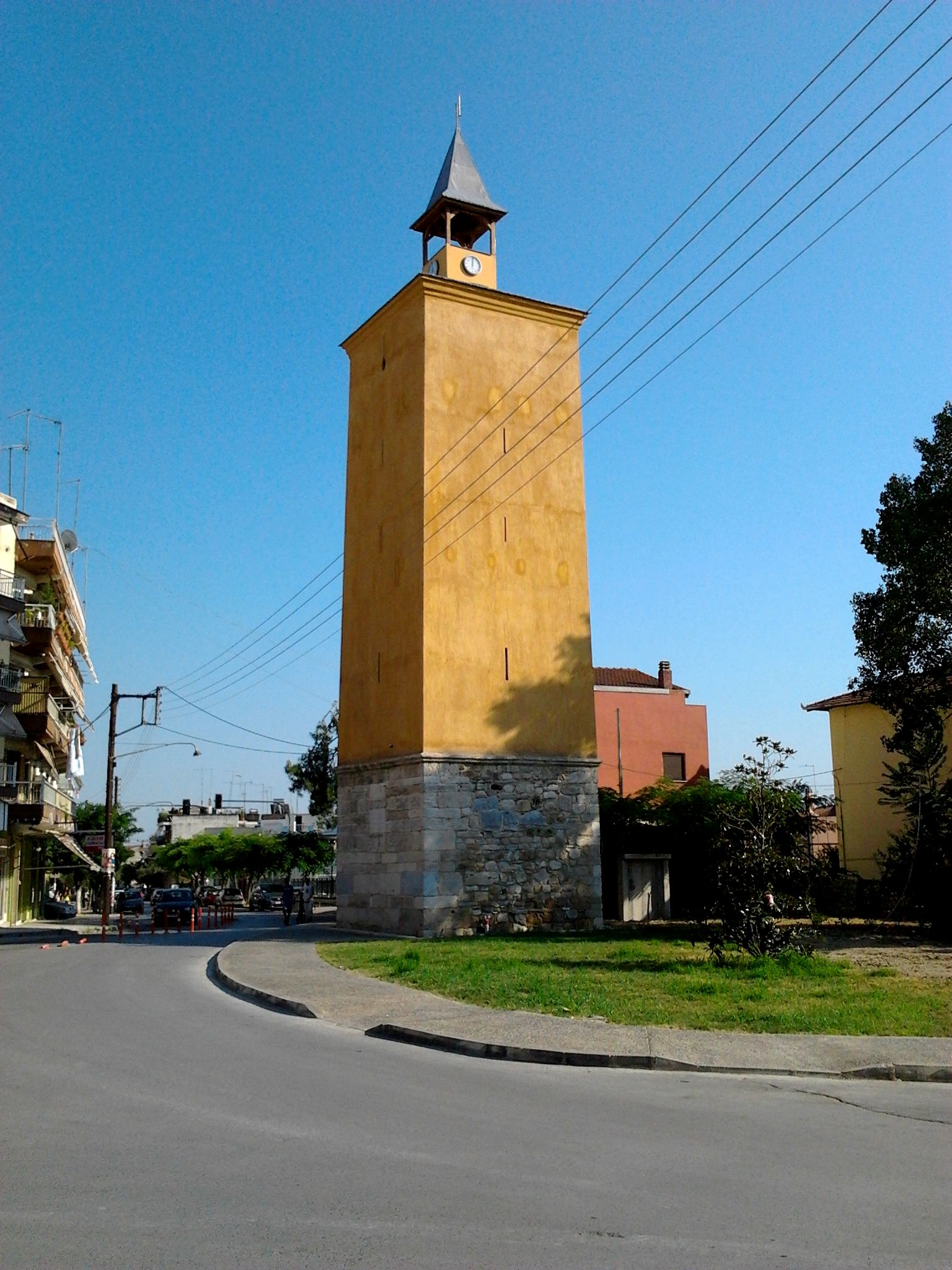
Ottoman clock tower

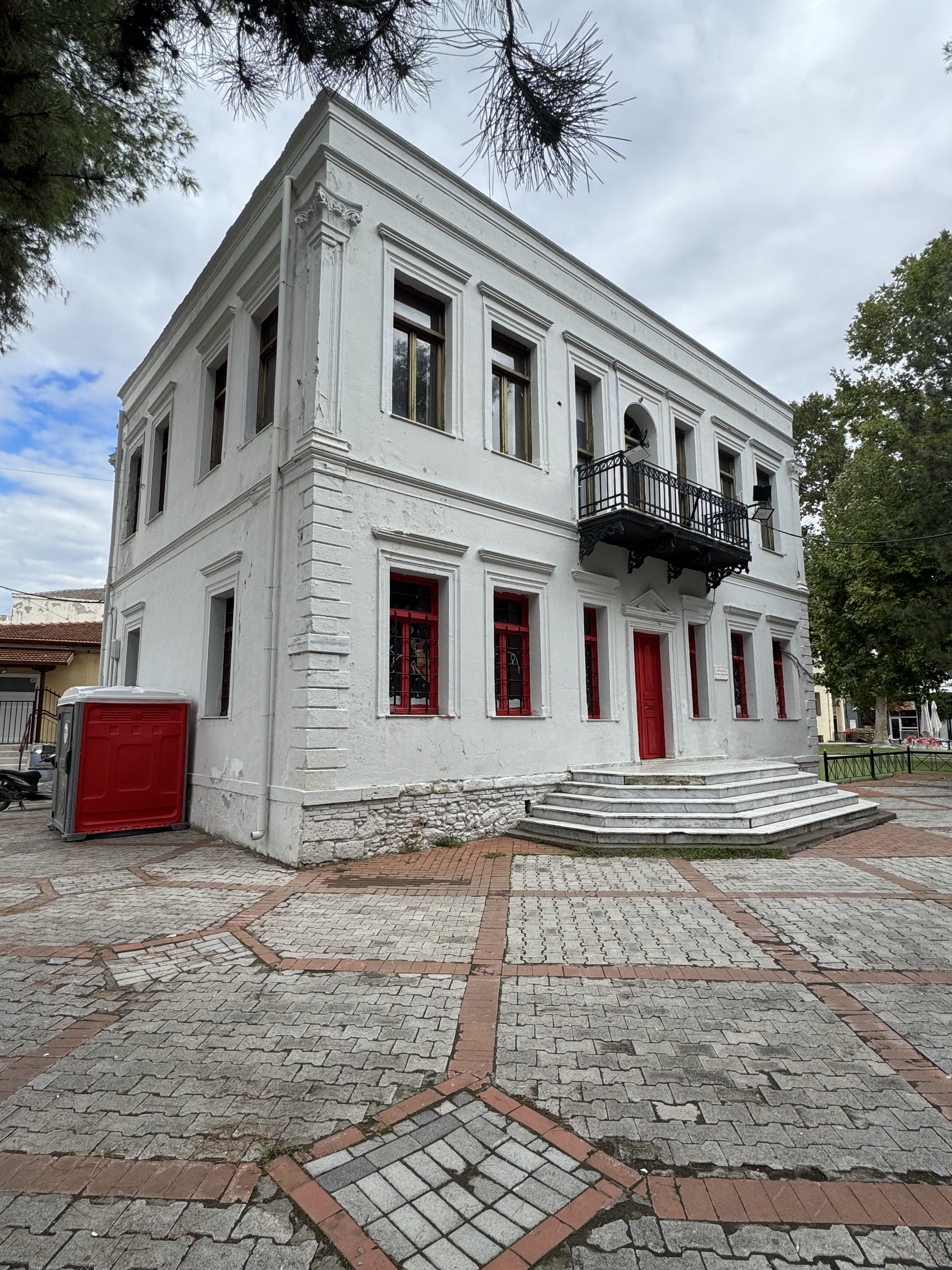
House of Emin Bey at EPON Square

There are also several non-Ottoman points of interest both, in the town and just outside, including:

- Ancient Pella, c. 400 B.C.
- Ancient Macedonian Tombs, c. 400–300 B.C.
- St. Athanasios Church, c. 1700
- The Church of the Dormition of the Theotokos, c. 1858–1860
- Catholic Church of Sts. Peter and Paul, 1861
- Church of Sts. Constantine and Helen (The old Sts. Cyril and Methodius Bulgarian exarchist church), 1906
- Neoclassical Multicentre
- Filippeio Park and Tourist Centre
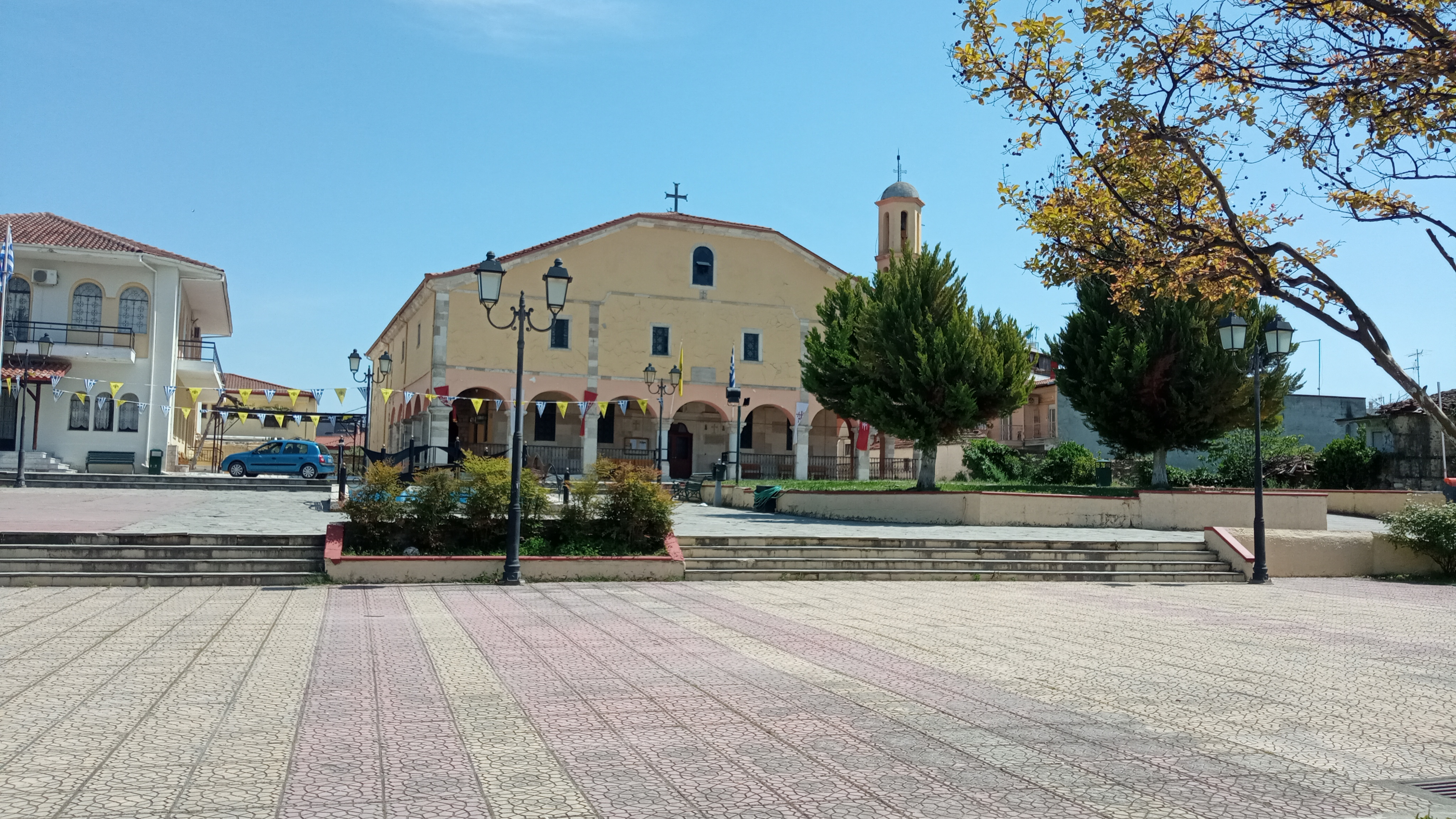
Church of the Dormition of the Theotokos

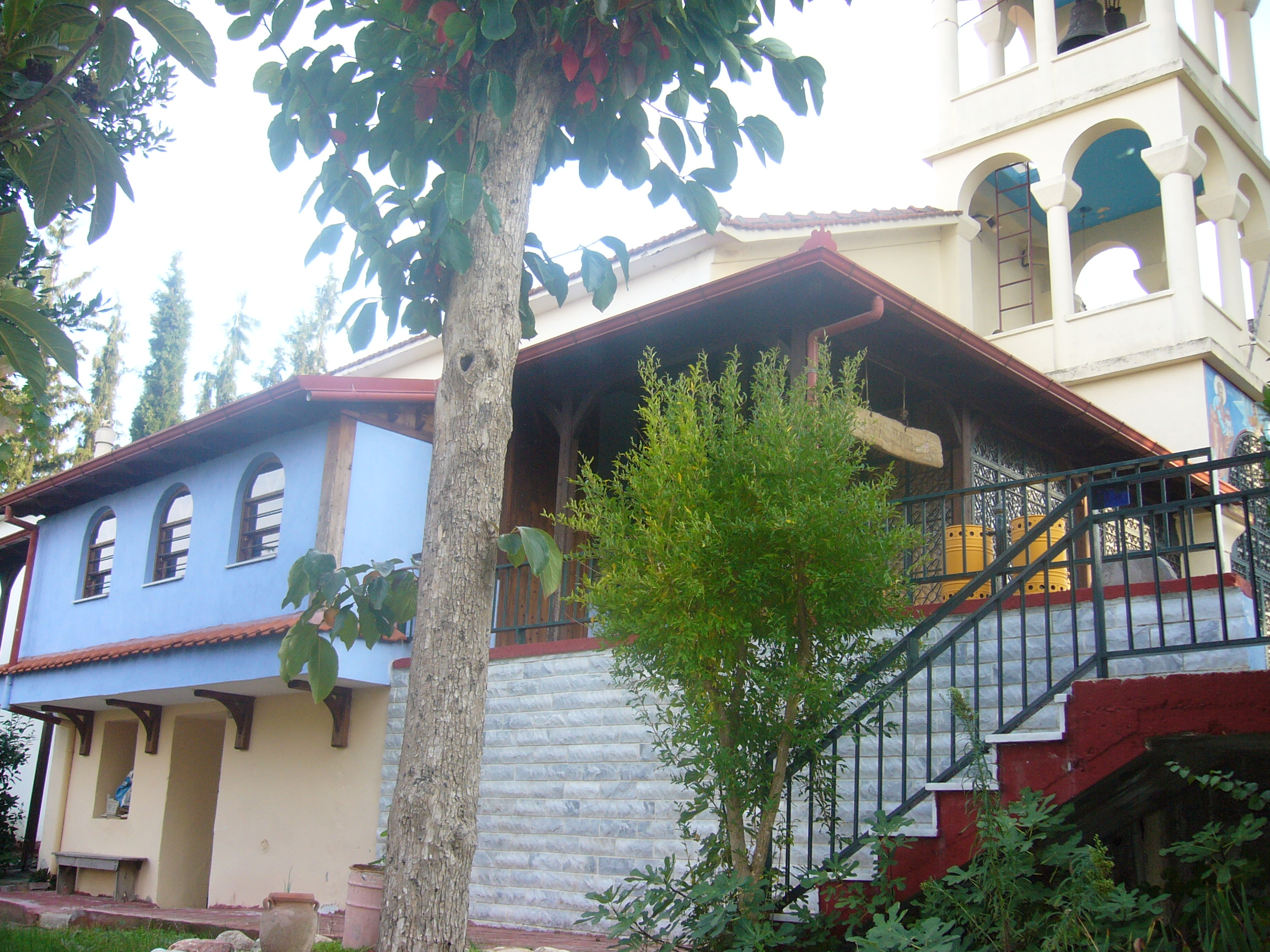
Catholic church of Sts. Peter and Paul

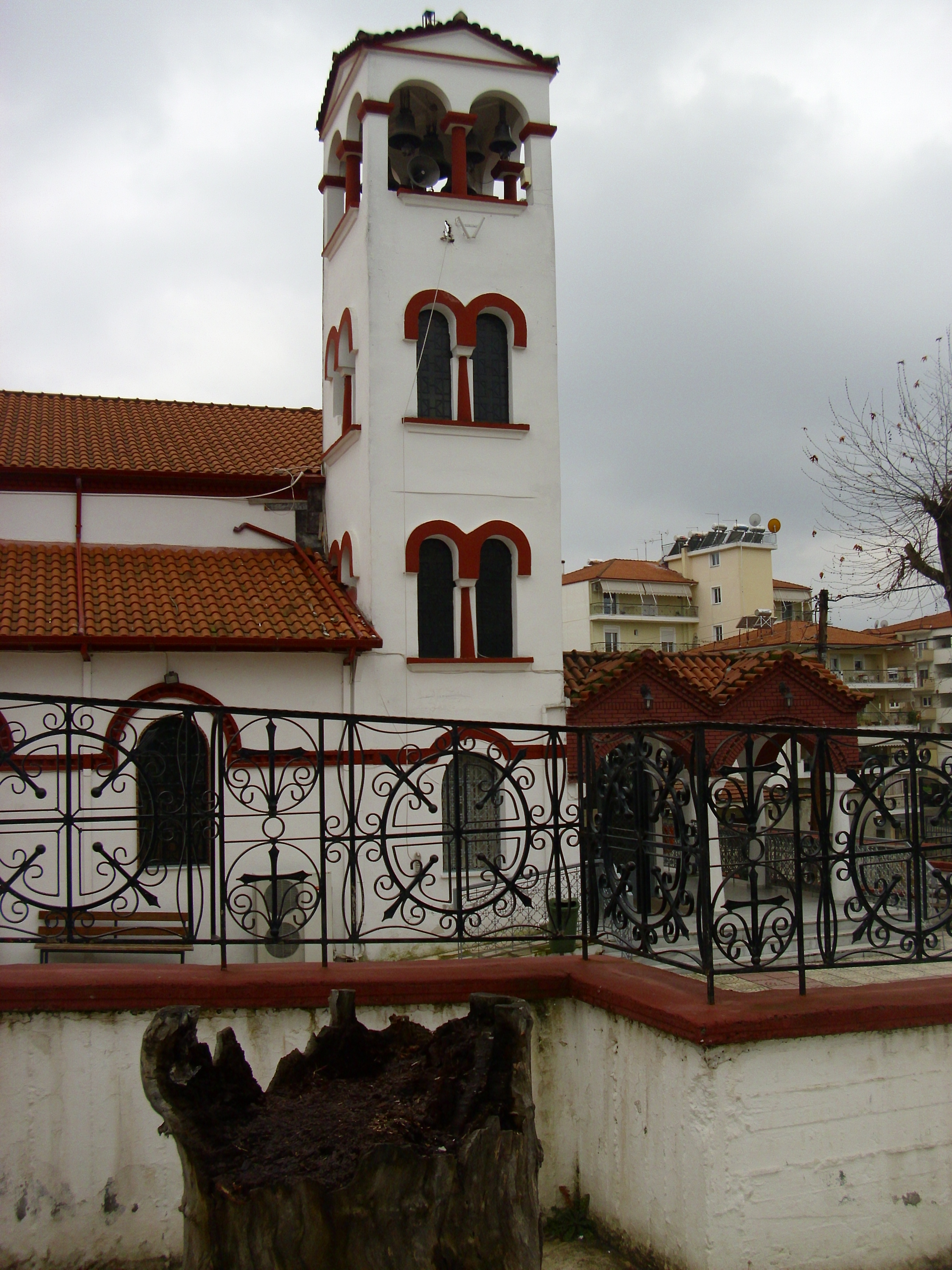
Church of Sts. Constantine and Helen

=== Museums ===
- The Folklore Museum of Giannitsa (opened in October 1977) by the "Philippos" History and Folklore Association to promote local history and traditions.
- The Military Museum of Giannitsa (opened 24 February 2012), displays photographs, texts, weapons, uniforms, medals and other materials, with a particular emphasis on the Macedonian Struggle and the Balkan Wars.
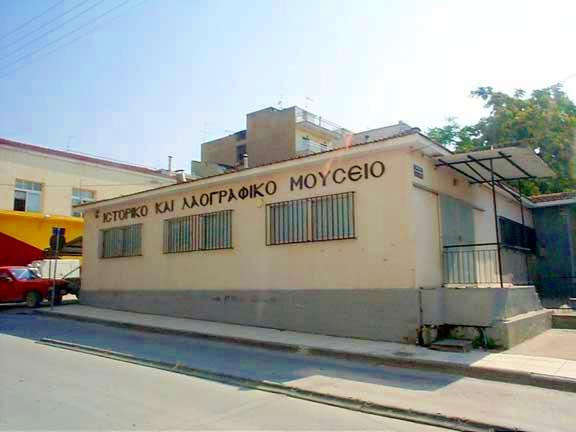
Folklore Museum of Giannitsa

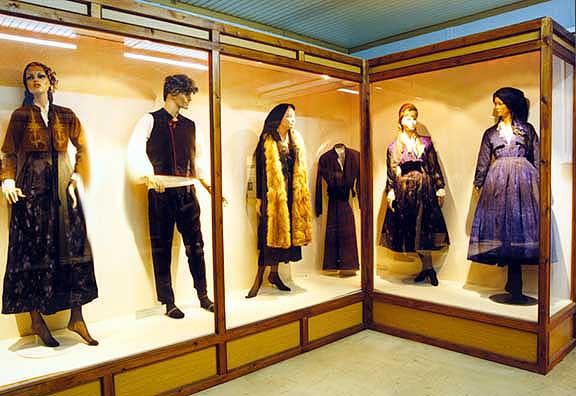
Traditional costumes exhibit

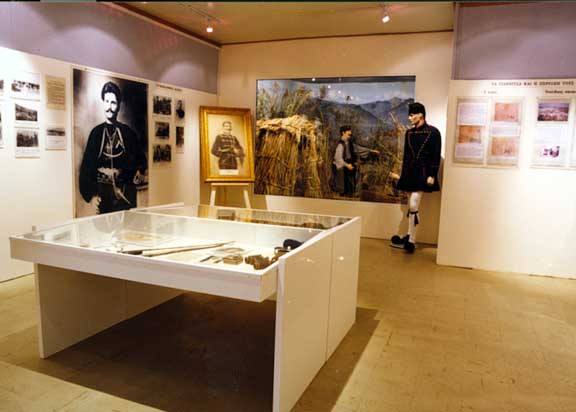
Macedonian Struggle exhibit

=== Statues ===
- Alexander the Great, near the Cultural Centre, unveiled on 20 October 2009, the anniversary of the liberation of the city and the Day of the Macedonian Struggle.
- Philip II of Macedon, located in the "Filippio" park and tourist centre. Near the statue, there is a relief depicting the Macedonian phalanx.
- Busts of the Makedonomachoi Gonos Yiotas, Konstantinos Boukouvalas, and Ioannis Demestichas in Gonou Yiota Square
- A bust of Constantine I of Greece in St. George Park
- A bust of Eleftherios Venizelos in EPON Square
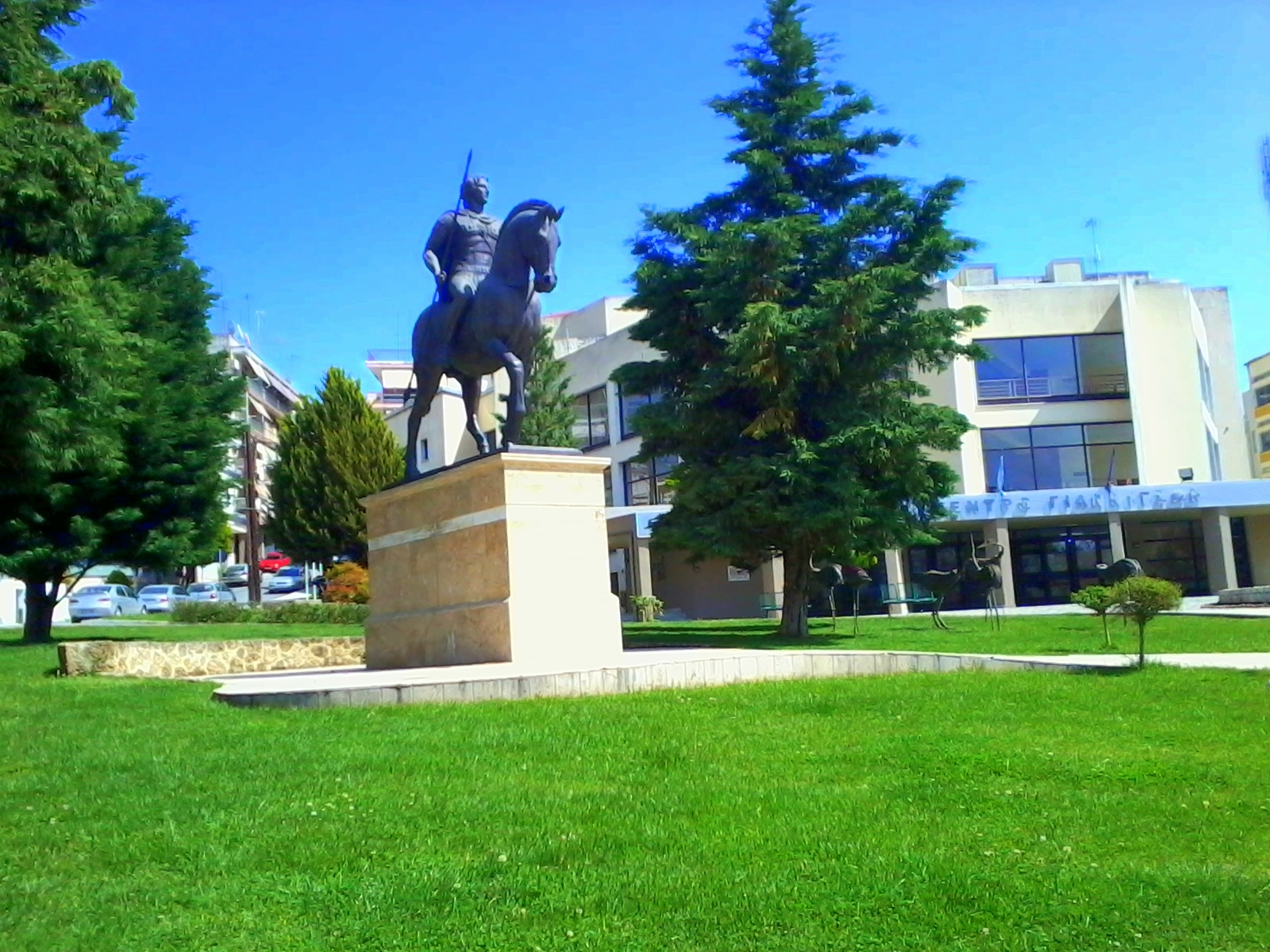
Statue of Alexander the Great

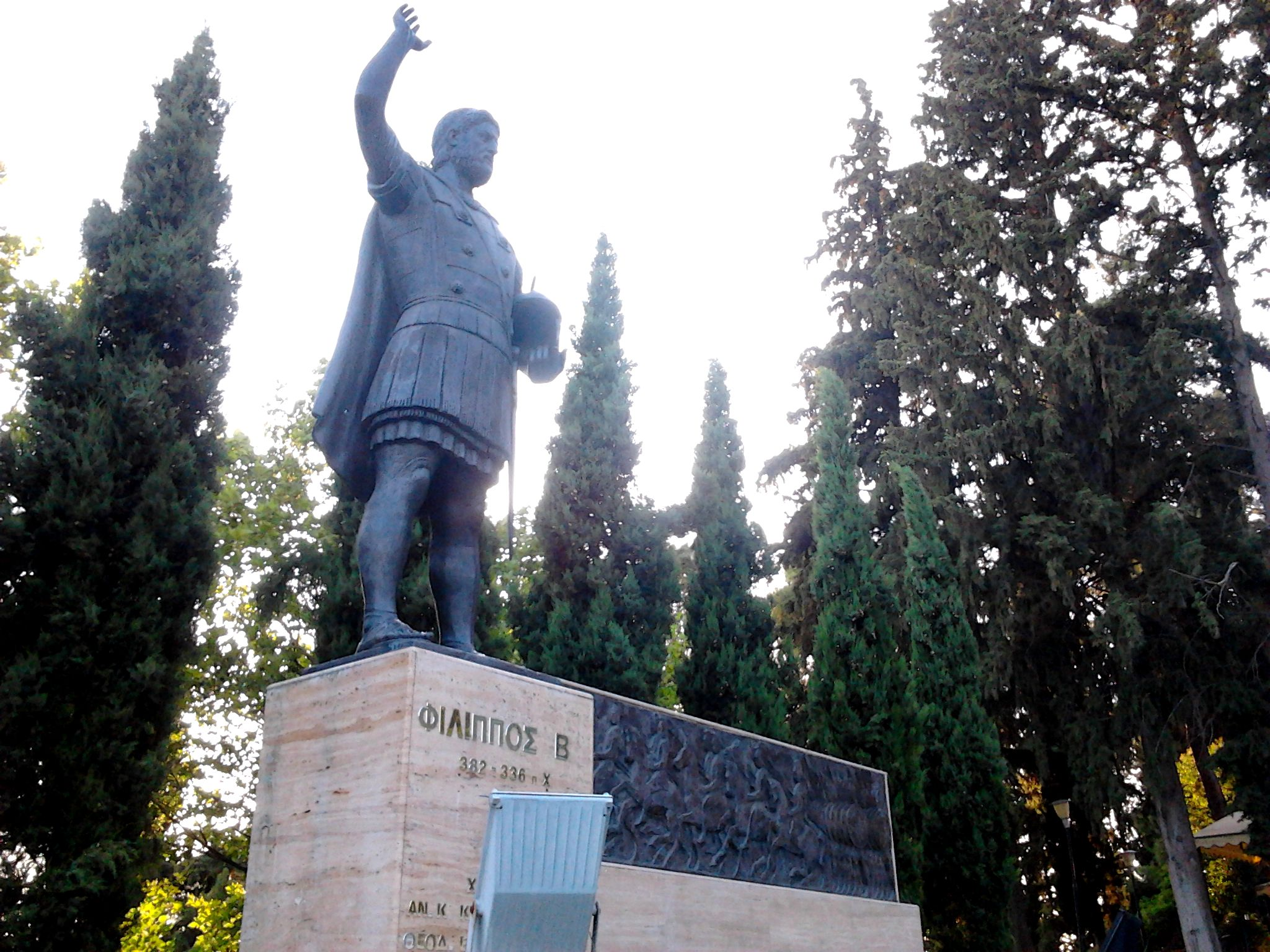
Statue of Philip of Macedon

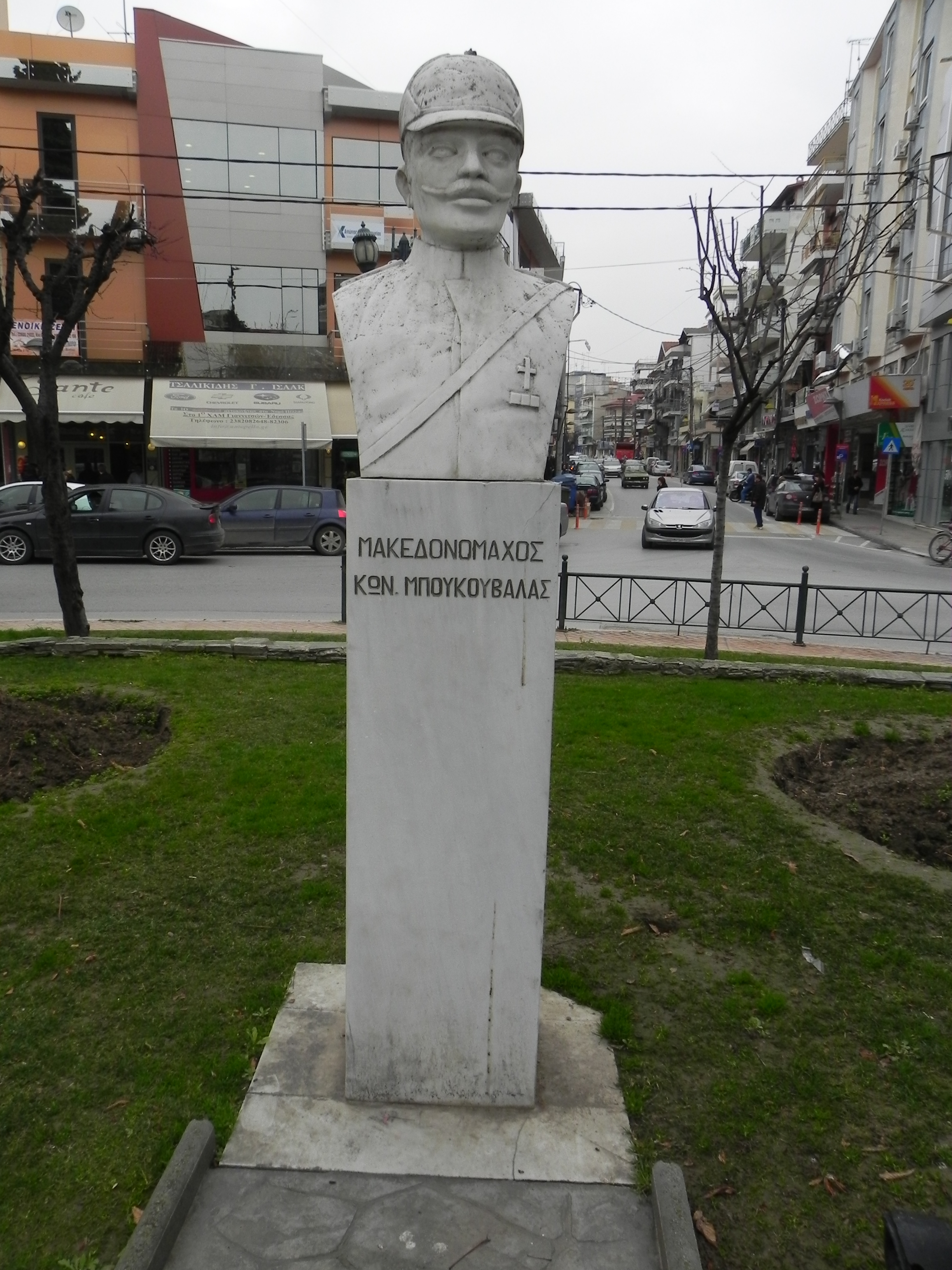
Bust of Konstantinos Boukouvalas

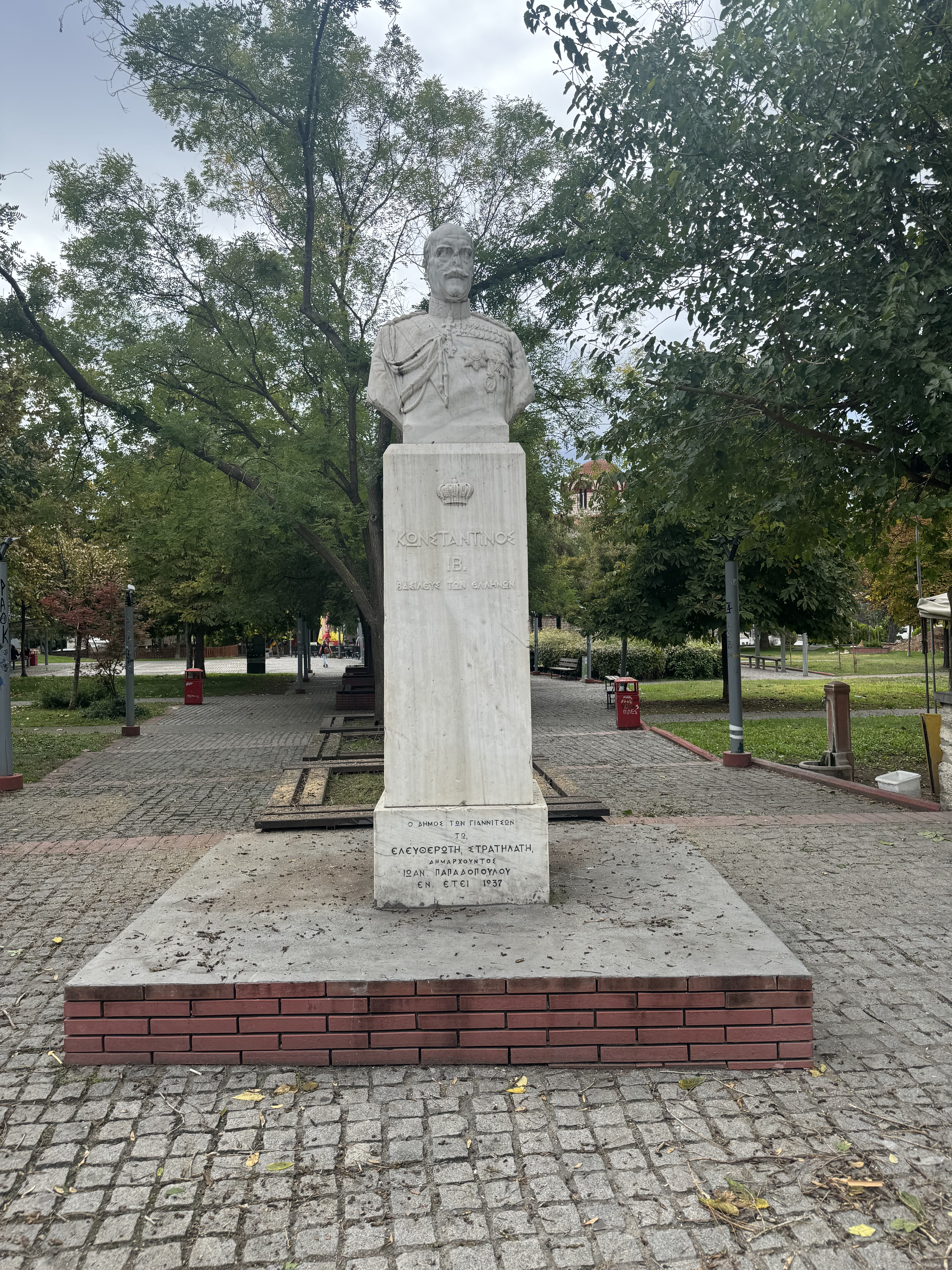
Bust of Constantine I

=== Memorials ===
- Black Statue – The Memorial of Giannitsà, by sculptor Gregory Zevgolis, erected at the eastern entrance to the town in 1926 in honor and remembrance of the Battle of Giannitsa
- Mass Grave, a list of the residents who were executed at the 1st Primary School on 14 September 1944 by German troops
- Memorial of EOKA fighters Michalis Karaolis and Andreas Dimitriou, executed by the British during the Cyprus Emergency
- Memorial to the Greek resistance of World War II in EPON Square
- A bust in memory of Cpl. Georgios T. Rousis, killed in the Turkish invasion of Cyprus
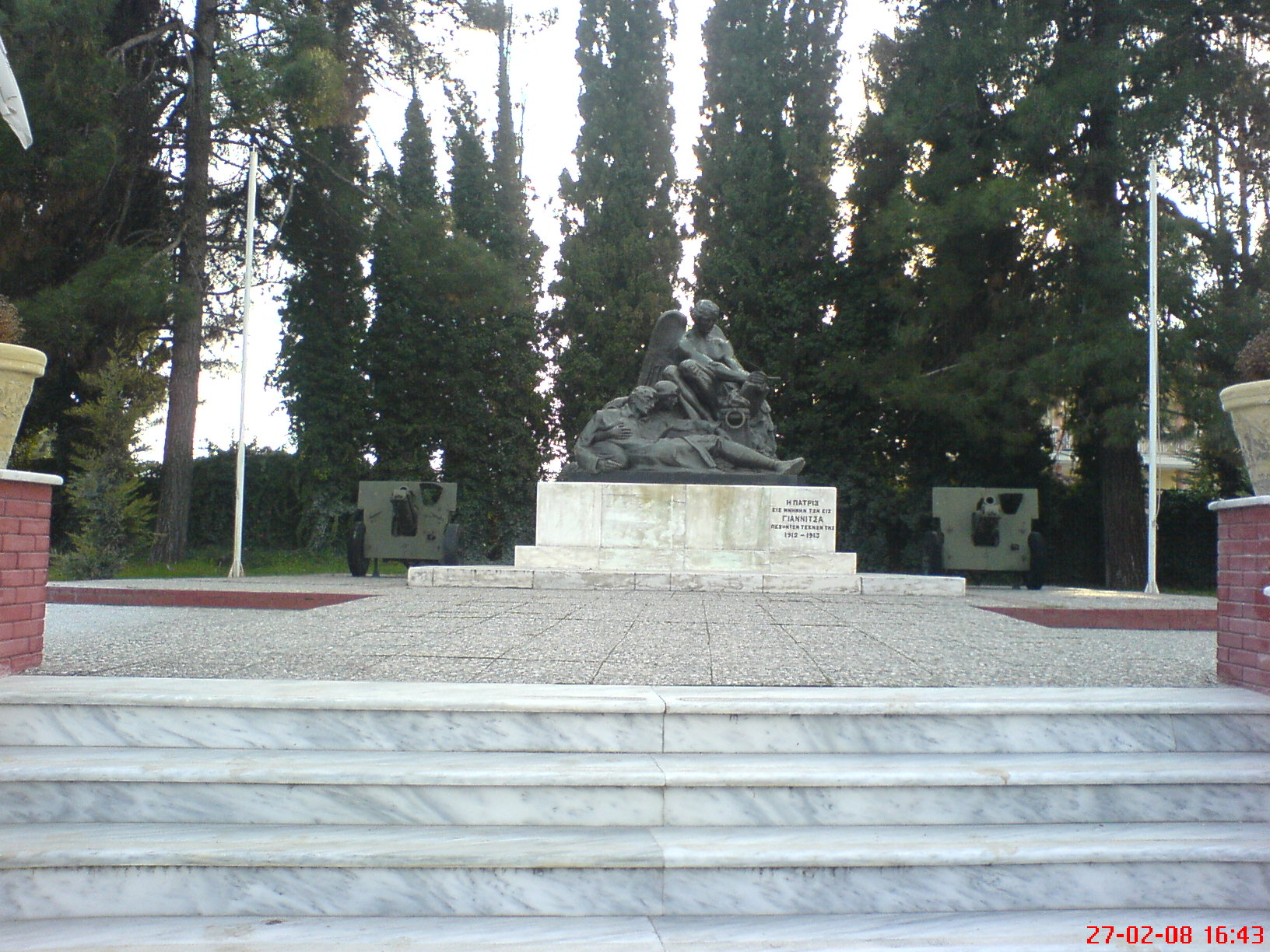
The Black Statue

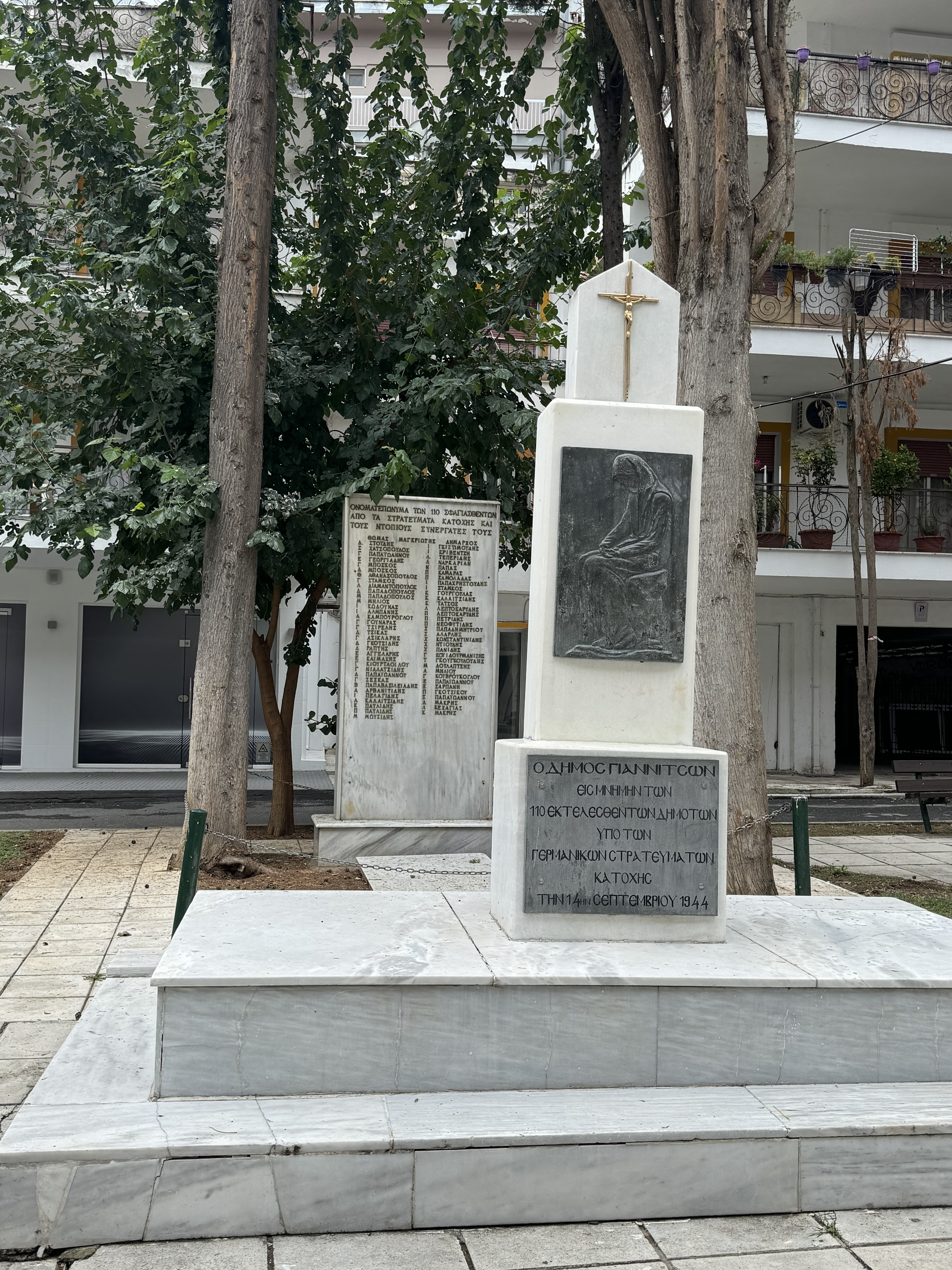
Mass grave memorial

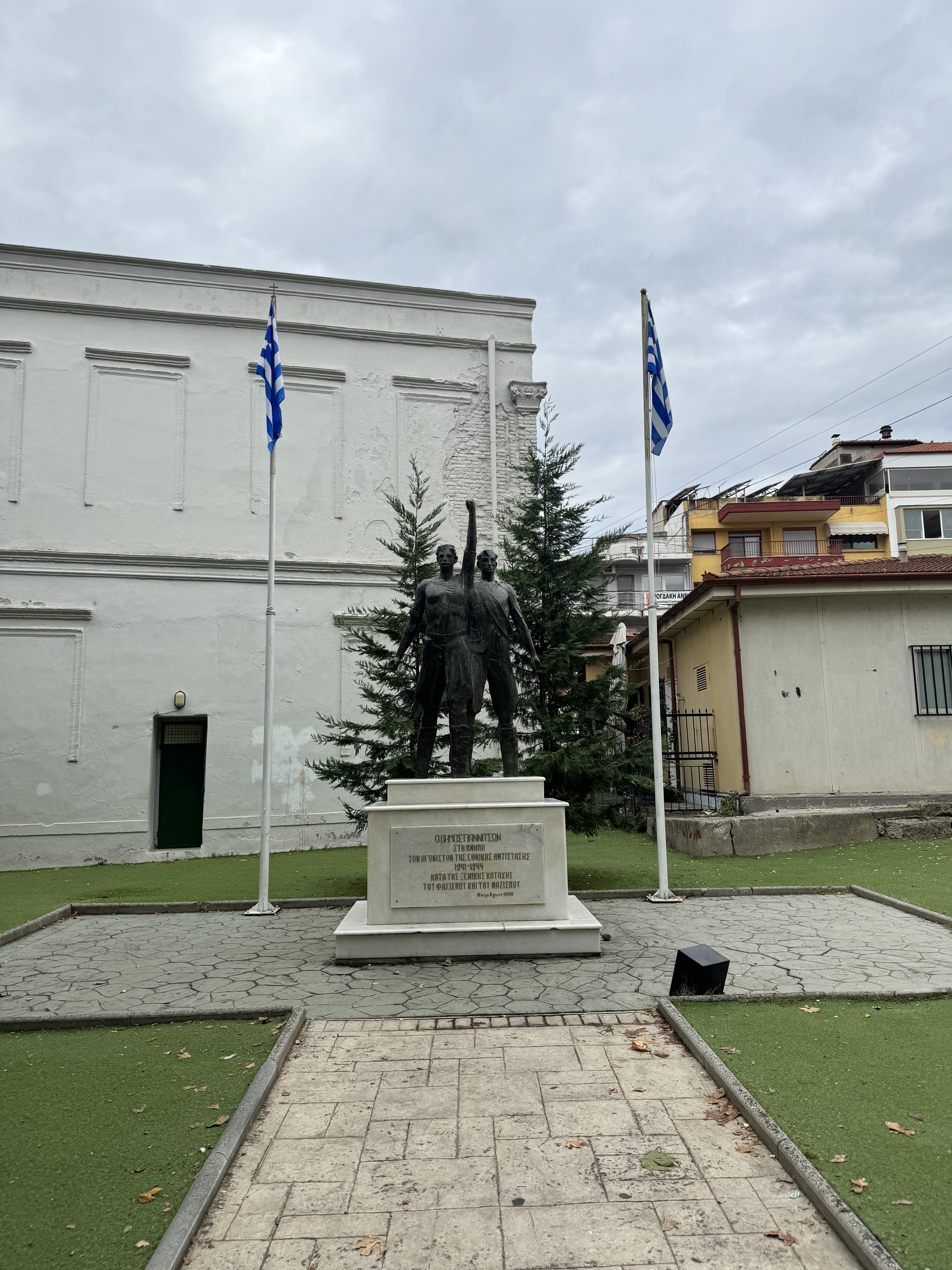
Greek Resistance memorial

=== Aravissos ===
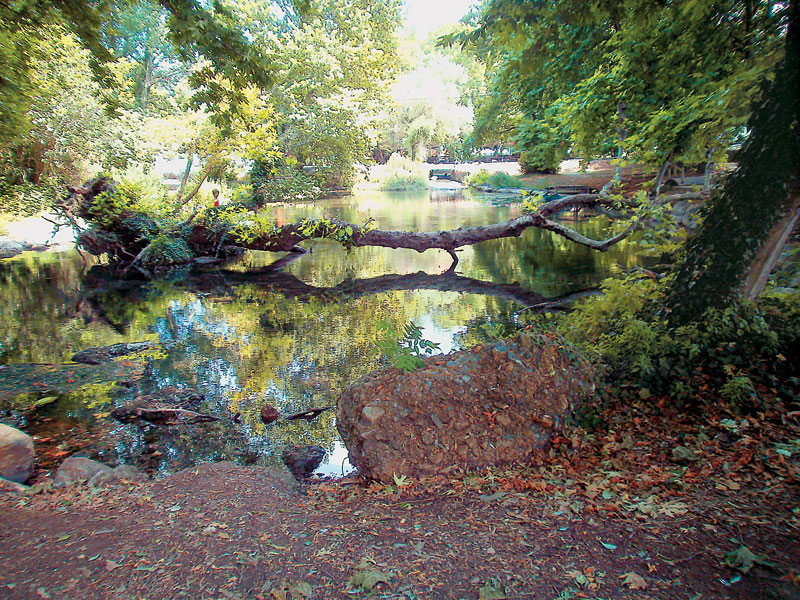
Park of Aravissos

About 10 km (6 mi) northwest of the city is the spring of Aravissos, which produces drinking water. The surrounding grove and creek include a popular park.

== Economy ==
Giannitsa is predominantly a rural area. The draining of the Lake Giannitsà left fertile soil for agriculture, leading to population growth in the region.

== Entertainment ==
The focus of the social life of the city is at the central pedestrian street, where people gather to eat and drink, or to take a walk. Giannitsa was one of the first cities that had an open theatre (3000 seats). Also various theatrical and musical events take place in a closed theater located inside the Cultural Centre. In the first days of September there is a big market for about a week. The DI.K.E.P.A.P. (ΔΗ.Κ.Ε.Π.Α.Π) is a charitable non-profit cultural organization founded in 1996 that develops music, visual arts, dance, film and other arts. Seven kilometers (4.3 miles) south of the center is the Loudias River, which has a sailing centre, where the Nautical Club of Giannitsa (NOG) teaches canoeing, kayaking, and rowing. There are also several sports facilities, including soccer fields, basketball courts, tennis courts, and a track.

== Districts ==
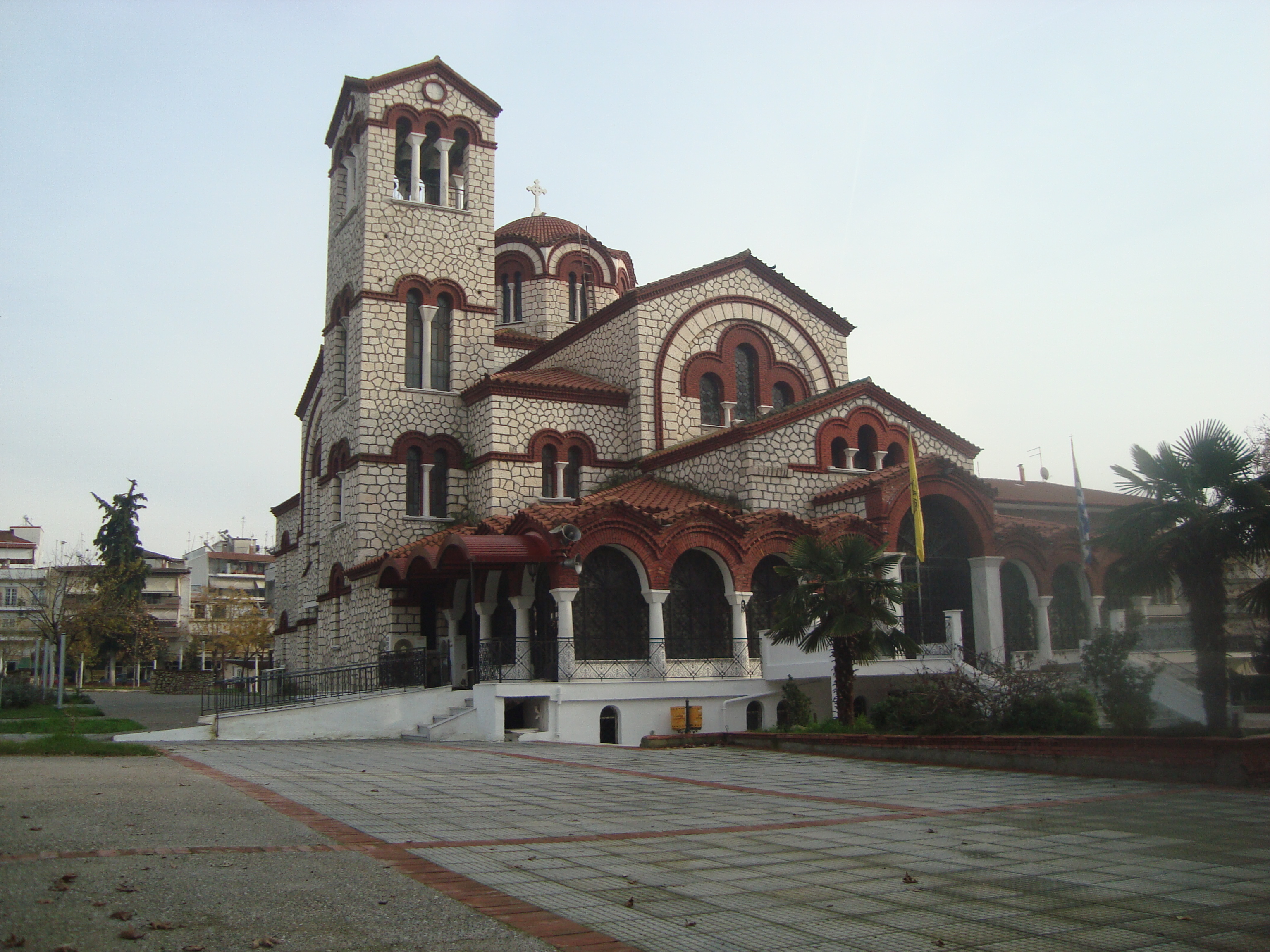
Saint George church

- Centre
- St. George
- Ayía Paraskeví
- Sfageia
- Sinoikismos
- Mitropoli
- St. Konstantinos
- Tsali (Nea Trapezounta)
- Filippeio
- Kapsali
- Palaia agora

== Local media ==
=== Newspapers ===
- O Logos tis Pellas (weekly; Greek Ο λόγος της Πέλλας)
- Giannitsa (daily; Greek Γιαννιτσά)

=== TV station ===
- Pella TV (Greek Πέλλα τηλεόραση)

=== Online newspapers ===
- Pella24
- Pellanet
- Giannitsa City news
- Logos Pellas

== Sports ==
The most popular team is the Anagennisi Giannitsa which plays at the Municipal Stadium.

There is a motocross track northwest of the city, in the foothills of Mount Paiko, where local, Greek, and European races are run.

At the river Loudias, there are rowing races in which the Nautical Club participates.

== Twin towns and sister cities ==
Giannitsa is twinned with three cities:

- Larnaca, Cyprus, since 2003
- Crotone, Italy, since 2010
- New Britain, Connecticut, United States, since 2010

== Notable people ==
- Gazi Evrenos (died 1417), founder of the Ottoman city, whose mausoleum is in the center of town
- Yakup Ağa, Ottoman soldier and Sipahi, took part in the capture of Lesbos from the Genoese
- Hayreddin Barbarossa (1478-1546) his father Yakup Ağa is from Giannitsa, was appointed Kapudan Pasha (Grand admiral) of the Ottoman Navy by Suleiman the Magnificent
- K̲h̲ayālī (died 1556), Ottoman poet
- Āgehī (died 1577), Ottoman poet and historian
- Hayâlî (1500–1557), Ottoman poet
- Georgios 'Gonos' Giotas (1880–1911), Greek revolutionary in the Macedonian Struggle
- Ahmet Derviş (1883–1932), military officer in the Ottoman and Turkish armies
- Sotirios Gotzamanis (1884-1958), physician and National Reform Party politician, accused of treason
- Ioannis Kourkourikis (born 1971), Greek Olympic rower
- Theofilos Karasavvidis (born 1971), former soccer player
- Melina Aslanidou (born 1974), singer born in Germany, but raised in Giannitsa
- Elisavet Mystakidou (born 1977), Greek Olympic silver medalist in taekwondo
- Monsieur Minimal (born 1980), indie pop music composer
- Effie Achtsioglou (born 1985), SYRIZA politician
- Dimitrios Karadolamis (born 1987), basketball player for OFI Crete
- Andreas Varsakopoulos (born 1990), Television personality, personal trainer, Lecturer currently living in South Korea
- Dimitrios Pelkas (born 1993), soccer player playing as an attacking midfielder for PAOK
- Alexandros Varitimiadis (1994-2023), basketball player for Raiffeisen Dornbirn Lions
- Ioanna Chamalidou (born 1996), soccer player playing as a forward for Panathinaikos
- Giannis Michailidis (born 2000), soccer player playing as a centre-back for PAOK
