= Elias Barzilai =

Chief Rabbi of Athens during the Holocaust

Elias (Eliaou) Barzilai Ηλίας Μπαρζιλάι
- Title: Chief Rabbi of Athens

Personal life
- Born: 1891 Thessaloniki, Greece
- Died: October 31, 1979 (aged 87–88) Athens, Greece
- Buried: Athens Jewish Cemetery
- Parents: Pinhas Barzilai (father); Tamar Barzilai (mother)

Religious life
- Religion: Judaism
- Yahrtzeit: 10 Heshvan 5740

Elias Pinhas Barzilai (Greek: Ηλίας Πινχάς Μπαρζιλάι; 1891, Thessaloniki – 31 October 1979, Athens) was the Chief Rabbi of the Jewish community of Athens, the capital of Greece, during the Axis occupation (1941–1944). His actions saved the lives of more than 3,000 Jews during the Holocaust.

== Education and early life ==
Elias Barzilai was born in Thessaloniki. His father, Pinchas, was rabbi and chairman of the Rabbinical Court (Beth Din) of Thessaloniki. A scholarship enabled the young Elias to study at the Hebrew University in Jerusalem. He then worked as a teacher in Drama (1926), as a teacher and rabbi in Belgrade (1933-1934), presumably briefly in Didymoticho (1934), and then in Tel Aviv (1934-1936). In January 1936 he was appointed Chief Rabbi of the Jewish Community of Athens because of his broad education and linguistic abilities. He was familiar with many languages: Hebrew, Ladino, Yiddish, French, Turkish, German, and Greek.

== Historical background ==
Following the German invasion of Greece in April 1941, Greece had to surrender on 23 April 1941 and the country was divided into three zones of occupation. Germany occupied western and central Macedonia (including Thessaloniki), the Evros prefecture on the Greek-Turkish border, the surroundings of Athens, most of Crete, and the Greek islands in the northern Aegean Sea close to Turkey. Bulgaria occupied the rest of Western Thrace and eastern Macedonia. Italy took the rest of mainland Greece, eastern Crete, and the Greek islands in the southern Aegean and the Ionian Sea.

Though the Germans were present, Athens was under Italian administration until September 1943. In contrast to the Germans and a few local commanders, the Italian army protected the Jews in their zone. The situation changed dramatically in September 1943 when Italy changed sides with the Armistice of Cassibile. The Germans took exclusive control of all of Greece and implemented the "Final Solution" throughout the rest of the country. In 1943, the Jewish Community of Athens had 3,000 registered members, while about 4,000 Jewish refugees from other cities also lived in the capital.

== First skirmishes ==
On September 1, 1941, the Italians formally announced the appointment of Barzilai as President of the Community. An earlier order appointing him by the Nazis was completely ignored by the Italians. The opposition between the two allies on Jewish issues, fueled by Barzilai, erupted into apparent controversy. The Italian authorities took specific measures for the protection of persecuted Jews. In retaliation, the Nazis increased the pressure.

On July 14, 1942, an incident took place that later would prove favorable for the persecuted Jews: a group of extreme right-wingers of the fascist Hellenic Socialist Patriotic Organisation or ESPO (Ελληνική Σοσιαλιστική Πατριωτική Οργάνωσις, ΕΣΠΟ), incited by the Germans, invaded the offices of the Community. They stole files and all administrative documents that might be of interest to them. They destroyed everything they could not carry before trying to achieve their ultimate goal of setting the building on fire. Barzilai was able to warn the Italian authorities in time to prevent the fire. Five German soldiers were arrested by the Italians who, under pressure from the Germans, were forced to release them. Barzilai agreed to the liberation of the German soldiers only on the condition that the German police would give him a certificate stating that a group of burglars - this is how it characterized it - had taken the Community archives, as well as all the booklets of the members of the Community. This certificate was given by the German police and was carefully kept in the hands of the rabbi.

== Resistance and escape to the mountains ==
A few days after the Armistice of Cassibile, SS-Hauptsturmführer Dieter Wisliceny, who had already organized the deportations from Thessaloniki, was sent to Athens to capture all Jews of Athens and of parts of Greece who were previously under Italian occupation. The Chief Rabbi was immediately in his focus.

On September 21, 1943, Barzilai succeeded in denying the Germans to access the lists of the Jewish community members. He was ordered to present himself at the Gestapo headquarters at 14 Loukianou Street, Kolonaki. He faced down and outwitted SS Captain Dieter Wisliceny who ordered him to produce a list of all Jews in the city including their addresses and assets. Barzilai recalled: “I was surrounded by five Gestapo officers, all in black and with pistols in hand. I was ordered to do whatever they said without question or hesitation. I was ordered to prepare, in 12 hours, lists of all Jews, including their names, their home addresses, information on their assets, their job addresses, and the bank accounts of the Jews ". All this information had to be delivered the next day, September 22. The Chief Rabbi promised to provide everything to their satisfaction.

That night, Barzilai burned all new membership cards and he secretly gathered the city's Jews in the synagogue to advise them to disappear, to leave their homes immediately, flee as far as possible, and not tell anyone about their escape plan. Then he called those who had not come. He used metaphors and paraphrases, for example: "The patient is very ill and the doctors recommend he leaves the city for the mountains."

The next morning he stood in front of Wisliceny, without lists, but with the certificate of the German Police from 1942, from which it emerged that all archives had been stolen as a result of a break-in. He added that a new register had not been compiled since then and that the 12-hour deadline had not been enough for him to recall all the names of the Community’s members. Barzillai's statement angered Wisliceny, who was eventually forced to extend the deadline for another 48 hours.

Barzilai immediately gathered at the synagogue the city's Jews. It was decided to meet with the Archbishop of Athens Damaskinos and ask refugee for the Jews to be hidden in churches and monasteries and with the collaborationist Prime Minister, Ioannis Rallis, accompanied by members of the community, to ask for their assistance.

Damaskinos offered to enable him to flee to the Middle East which was not accepted by the Chief Rabbi because he would be obliged to leave his family in Greece. Church asylum would be pointless for the Jews hiding there because the Germans would certainly not allow themselves to be held back. The Chief Rabbi demanded official intervention from the Prime Minister, but his reaction was more than cautious.

Damaskinos then proceeded to petition the German ambassador Günther Altenburg, “to not impose deportation measures on the Jews of Athens and the southern Greek provinces, which had come under German administration as a result of Italy’s surrender”. The ambassador replied that he had no influence whatsoever on Eichmann's troops. Thereupon the Archbishop ordered all priests and monasteries to give help and assistance to persecuted Jews by all means.

The Chief Rabbi also appealed to the Greek Resistance and as a result of his intervention, the National Liberation Front (EAM) undertook to help those Jews who would flee to the mountains.

The same night, almost all the Jewish leaders disappeared. Barzilai and his family took refuge in a friendly house in Kolonaki. The lawyer Elias Kefalidis, a liaison of the Resistance, mediated for the escape of Barzilai to the mountains. His “kidnapping” by EAM was orchestrated on September 23, giving the signal to the Jews of Athens to flee.

On September 25, the Germans broke into the Community offices but they found nothing. Most of the Jews of Athens had already disappeared.

Barzilai and his family moved frequently fearing they could be captured by the Germans. After the first stop in Xironomi, followed by a stop in Lidoriki EAM brought them to Krokylio in Phocis, a difficult-to-access village at 850 meters above sea level where they stayed for six months because his daughter was ill from typhus. After six months they came to Velouchi and then finally to Petrino in Karditsa Prefecture, near the headquarters of ELAS, the People's Liberation Army, the military arm of EAM. Barzilai held out there until the country was liberated. Then he returned to Athens, where he continued his efforts for the reorganization of the Community.

Although around 800 Jews were arrested by the Germans and deported later on 24 March 1944 to the extermination camps, due to the intervention of Barzilai, the assistance of Archbishop Damaskinos, and of the Athens Police Chief Angelos Evert, who issued false identification cards, the losses of the Jews in Athens totalled about 1,000 people. By way of comparison, the Jewish Community of Athens had had around 3,000 members, and approximately 4,000 Jewish refugees had settled in the city from elsewhere in addition.

Barzilai remained officially in the service of the Jewish Community until 1963 when he resigned.

== Recognition ==
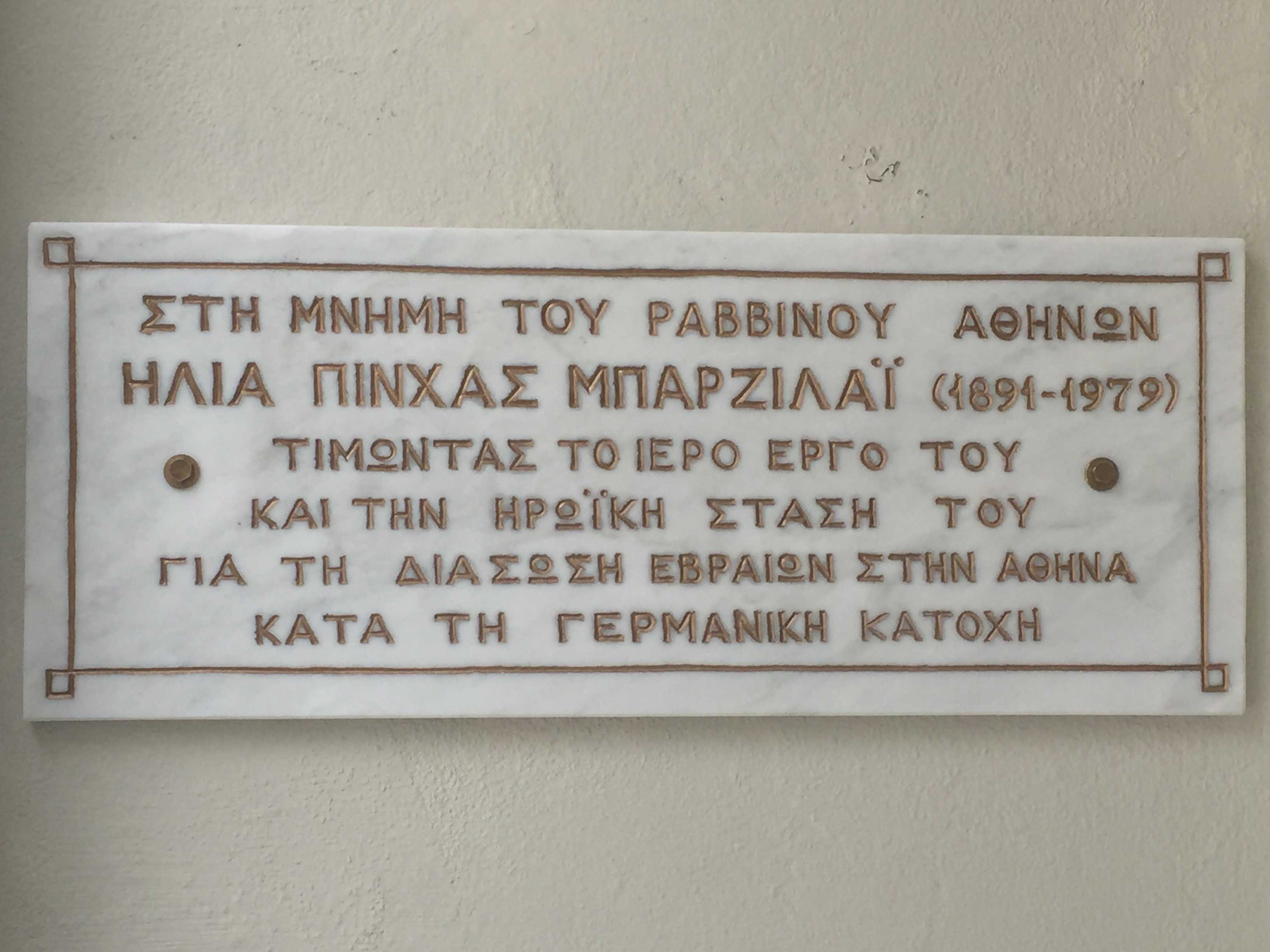
Memorial plaque in memory of the courageous acts of Rabbi Elias Barzilai

A memorial plaque in the memory of the courageous acts of Barzilai has been placed in the courtyard of the Synagogue of Athens.

At a ceremony that took place at the Synagogue of Athens on February 23, 2020, the role of Barzilai was commemorated by the Director of B’nai B’rith World Center-Jerusalem who presented a Jewish Rescuers Citation in honor of the Rabbi to his descendants.
