= DEGRIGES =

Business

The DEGRIGES (German: Deutsch-Griechische Warenausgleichsgesellschaft mbH, "German-Greek Commodity Equalization Company, Ltd.") was a trading company which was founded one year after the beginning of the Axis occupation of Greece by the Reich Finance Ministry and based in Berlin. Branches existed in Athens, Thessaloniki, Volos and Patras. It had the monopoly on the foreign trade of Greece from October 1942 onwards. It was the main vehicle for the economic exploitation of Greece by Nazi Germany until the withdrawal of German troops in October 1944.

== History ==
=== Background ===
Following the German invasion of Greece and the start of the occupation, the German authorities initially used the Bank of Greece to extract material and financial assets and to gather occupation costs. The occupation costs were the highest among the various territories occupied by Nazi Germany.

The first measure taken was the altering of the exchange rate from 1:50 to 1:60 in clearing transactions and the compulsory involvement of the Bank of Greece in the export of Greek goods to Germany. For each export, the bank was obliged to transfer the value of the goods to an escrow account in Berlin to the benefit of the German importer and to pay the producer for the goods simultaneously. In essence, the Bank of Greece thereby granted temporary loans to the German merchants. Since prices were fixed at pre-war levels, and payment was dropped for any delayed delivery of the goods, which occurred frequently because of the wartime conditions, the importers accumulated considerable profits at the expense of the producers.

After the confiscation of goods by the occupation authorities, the local producers in Greece were forced to switch from an export-oriented economy to a subsistence economy and so no more material assets could be extracted. At the same time, the occupation authorities exported a large number of raw materials like iron ore, copper or resins, as well as foodstuffs, which resulted in the Great Famine, particularly in the winter of 1941–1942. In addition, to facilitate the extraction of assets, the amount of banknotes in circulation was increased and so the Greek drachma soon lost its value through hyperinflation.

=== Establishment and operation of DEGRIGES ===
After all extant assets were exhausted, the Deutsch-Griechische Warenausgleichsgesellschaft mbH (DEGRIGES) was established on 1 October 1942, headquartered in Berlin. The initiative lay with the Reich Finance Ministry, with the participation of the Reich economy groups for Trade and Industry, and the Bulk and Export Trade economy group. The formally private enterprise possessed a state foreign trade monopoly. The collaborationist government sent Konstantinos Logothetopoulos as its negotiator.

Otto Braun, the owner of the Transdanubia trade company, became the company's first director. A branch office was located in Berlin, led by Fred Goecker, vice-chairman of the German chamber of commerce in Greece, as well as another in Thessaloniki. Corresponding offices were opened in Patras and Volos. From 15 October 1942, it was controlled by Hermann Neubacher, the former mayor of Vienna and Reich plenipotentiary in the Balkans and particularly "Reich Special Envoy for Economic and Financial Issues in Greece".

The company began operations on 28 November, and a few days later the Bank of Greece was forced to hand over its foreign exchange reserves to the German Reich in the form of a compulsory loan. By the end of the war, the loan amounted to 476 million Reichsmark. After the departure of most German troops from Greece in October 1944, DEGRIGES was dissolved on 8 December 1944.

== Mission and impact ==
The company levied surcharges on all Greek export goods, four sevenths of which were used to lower prices for German importers and to three sevenths to service the occupation costs.

Prices of goods exported from Greece were considerably reduced, and prices of German goods imported to Greece were greatly increased. This brought exceptional advantages for the German economy, euphemistically termed "lockage profits" (Schleusungsgewinne). Through such policies of extreme price manipulation, the company succeeded in overturning the considerable trade deficit between the two countries. Despite the wholesale confiscation of Greek products and the imposition of occupation costs, the trade balance in 1942 was 71 million Reichsmark in favour of Greece but suddenly reached 20 million Reichsmark in favour of Germany in 1943.

German interest was mainly focused on raw materials, which were increasingly needed as the war continued. In addition, since machinery and tools had been shipped to Germany, few finished products could be produced locally. Thus, between May 1941 and November 1944, about 28,000 tons of chromium were transported to Germany, about a quarter of the total requirements of the German war economy during the war.

The "success" of the company led to proposals for the establishment of similar companies in other countries, even in the allied Independent State of Croatia. In spring 1944, the German–Albanian Commodity Equalization Office (Deutsch-Albanisches Warenausgleichsbüro) was established. On the other hand, contemporary German sources reported, "The successes of Degriges are not unsatisfactory. They are, however, achieved at the price of a monopolization of foreign trade". Rainer Eckert wrote in 1992: "To date, the German-Greek Commodity Equalization Company represents one of the most evolved forms of state-regulated foreign economic relations".

== Sources ==
- Martin Seckendorf: Ein einmaliger Raubzug. Die Wehrmacht in Griechenland 1941 - 1944, in: Vorbild Wehrmacht? Wehrmachtsverbrechen, Rechtsextremismus und Bundeswehr. Issued by Christian Gerlach, Reinhard Kühnl and Johannes Klotz. Papyrossa, Cologne 1998
