= Axis occupation of Greece =

1941–1945 period during World War II

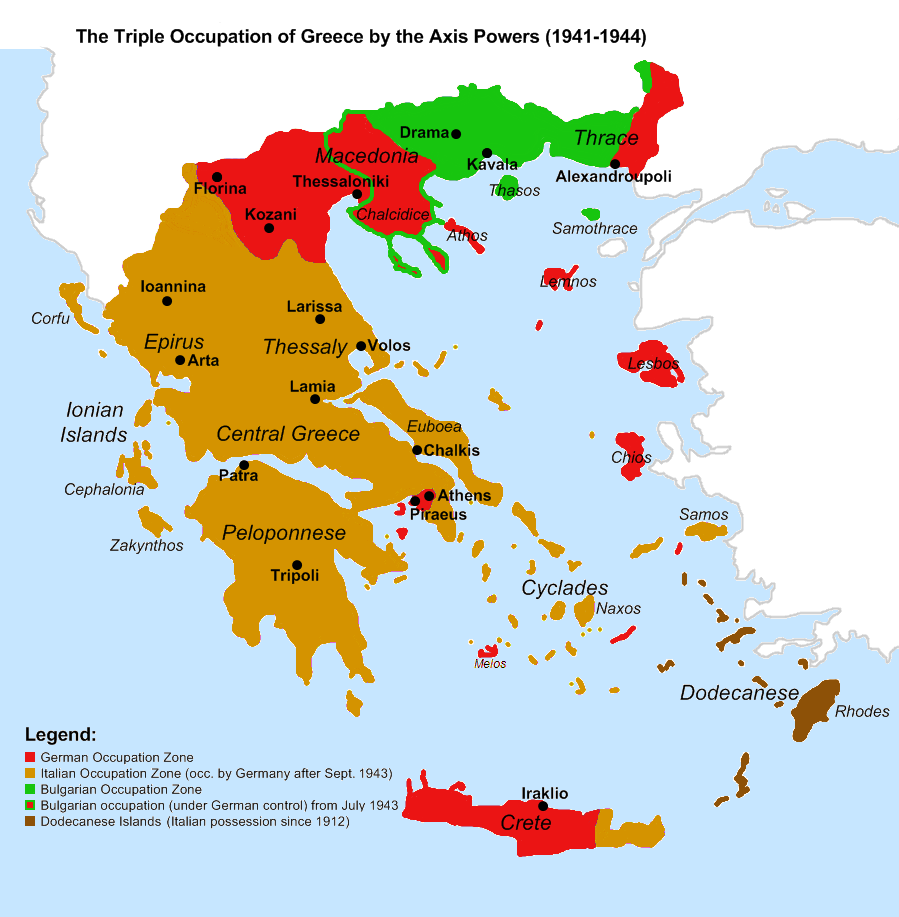
- The three occupation zones Italy Germany Bulgaria; The Italian zone was taken over by Germany in September 1943

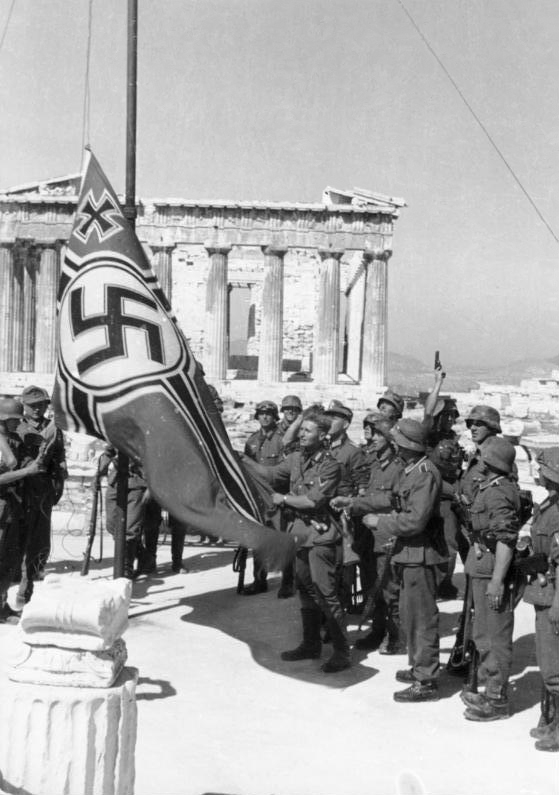
- 1941. German soldiers raising the German War Flag over the Acropolis. It would be taken down by Manolis Glezos and Apostolos Santas in one of the first acts of resistance.

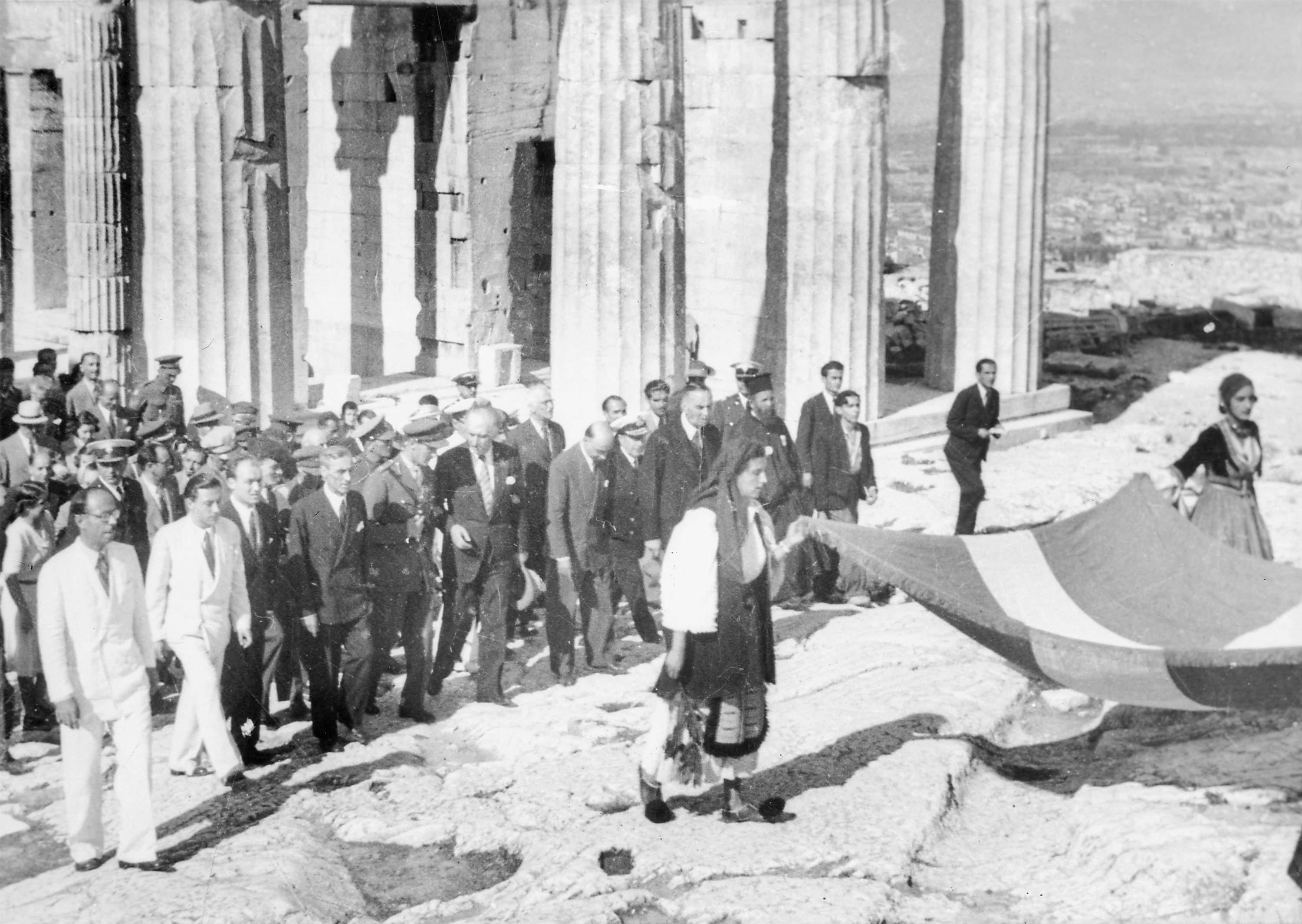
- 1944. Prime Minister Georgios Papandreou and others on the Acropolis after the liberation from the Nazis

The occupation of Greece by the Axis powers (Greek: Η Κατοχή, romanized: I Katochi, meaning "The Occupation") began in April 1941 after the German invasion of Greece to assist its ally, Fascist Italy, in the Greco-Italian War which had begun in October 1940. Following the Battle of Crete, all of Greece was occupied by June 1941. The occupation of the mainland lasted until Germany and its ally Bulgaria withdrew under Allied pressure in early October 1944. However, German garrisons remained in control of Crete and some other Aegean Islands until after the end of World War II in Europe, surrendering them in May and June 1945.

Upon conquering the country, the Axis powers established a "triple occupation", partitioning Greece into distinct zones. Nazi Germany administered the most strategically important regions, including Athens, Thessaloniki, Central Macedonia, and several Aegean islands. Fascist Italy controlled two-thirds of the mainland alongside the Ionian Islands, while Bulgaria occupied and annexed Eastern Macedonia and Thrace. To project a facade of legitimacy, the Axis authorities installed the collaborationist Hellenic State puppet government, which lacked actual power and was widely despised by the populace. Following the Italian armistice in September 1943, the German military swiftly took over the former Italian occupation zone.

The occupation brought catastrophic hardships to the Greek civilian population and devastated the nation's infrastructure. Aggressive Axis requisitioning, combined with a British naval blockade, triggered the Great Famine during the winter of 1941–1942, resulting in the deaths of an estimated 300,000 civilians. Hyperinflation ruined the economy, and massive destruction was inflicted on industries, villages, and logistics. Concurrently, the occupying forces carried out brutal reprisals against civilians, while the Holocaust in Greece resulted in the near-total eradication of the country’s Romaniote and Sephardic Jewish communities, with over 81% of Greek Jews being murdered in Nazi concentration camps.

In response to these atrocities, the Greek Resistance emerged as one of the most effective partisan networks in occupied Europe. Various insurgent groups formed across ideological lines, dominated by the communist-led National Liberation Front (EAM) and its military wing, ELAS, alongside non-communist organizations like the National Republican Greek League (EDES) and National and Social Liberation (EKKA). By 1943, these groups had successfully liberated much of the country's mountainous interior. However, deep-seated political rivalries escalated into localized armed civil conflict in late 1943. When the German army evacuated the mainland in late 1944 to avoid encirclement by the advancing Soviet Red Army, the prevailing power vacuum and ideological polarization set the stage for the outbreak of the Greek Civil War.

== Overview ==
Fascist Italy had declared war and invaded Greece in October 1940, but had been pushed back by the Hellenic Army into neighbouring Albania, an Italian protectorate. While most of the Hellenic Army was defending the Albanian front against Italian counter-attacks, a rapid German campaign took place from April to June 1941, resulting in Greece being defeated and occupied. The Greek government went into exile, and an Axis collaborationist government was established in its place. Greece's territory was divided into occupation zones run by the Axis powers, with the Nazi Germans administering the most important regions of the country, including Athens, Thessaloniki and strategic Aegean Islands. Other regions of the country were run by Nazi Germany's partners, Italy and Bulgaria.

The occupation destroyed the Greek economy and brought immense hardships to the Greek civilian population. Most of Greece's economic capacity was destroyed, including 80% of industry, 28% of infrastructure (ports, roads and railways), 90% of its bridges, and 25% of its forests and other natural resources. Along with the loss of economic capacity, an estimated 7–11% of Greece's civilian population died as a result of the occupation. In Athens, 40,000 civilians died from starvation (out of a total of 300,000 in the whole of the country) and tens of thousands more died from reprisals by Nazis and their collaborators.

The Jewish population of Greece was nearly eradicated. Of its pre-war population of 75–77,000, around 11–12,000 survived, often by joining the resistance or being hidden. Most of those who died were deported to Auschwitz, while those under Bulgarian occupation in Thrace were sent to Treblinka. The Italians did not deport Jews living in territory they controlled, but when the Germans took it over from them, Jews living there were also deported.

Greek Resistance groups were formed during this occupation. The most important of them was ELAS (Ellinikós Laïkós Apeleftherotikós Stratós – Greek People's Liberation Army), which was the military arm of the EAM (Ethnikó Apeleftherotikó Métopo – National Liberation Front). Both groups were strongly associated with the KKE (Kommounistikó Kómma Elládas – Communist Party of Greece). They were commonly named antartes from the Greek αντάρτης. The historian Mark Mazower wrote that the standing orders of the Wehrmacht in Greece was to use terror as a way to frighten the Greeks into not supporting the andartes (guerrillas).

This resistance group launched guerrilla attacks against the occupying powers, fought against collaborationist Security Battalions, and set up espionage networks.

Throughout the war against the Soviet Union, German propaganda portrayed the war as a noble struggle to protect European civilization from Bolshevism. Likewise, German officials portrayed the Reich as nobly occupying Greece to protect it from Communists and presented EAM as a demonic force. The andartes of ELAS were portrayed in both the Wehrmacht and the SS as a "savages" and "criminals" who committed all sorts of crimes and who needed to be hunted down without mercy.

The British engaged in numerous intelligence deceptions designed to fool the Germans into thinking that the Allies would be landing in Greece in the near future, and accordingly the German army forces were reinforced in Greece in order to stop the expected Allied landing in the Balkans. From the viewpoint of General Alexander Löhr, the commander of one Nazi Army Group in Greece, Army Group E, the attacks of the andartes, which forced his men to spread themselves out to hunt them down, were weakening his forces by leaving them exposed and spread out in the face of an expected Allied landing. However, the mountainous terrain of Greece ensured that there were only a limited number of roads and railroads bringing down supplies from Germany and the destruction of a single bridge by the andartes caused major supply problems for the German forces. The best known andarte operation of the war, namely the blowing up of the Gorgopotamos viaduct on the night of 25 November 1942, had caused Nazi Germans serious logistical problems as it severed the main railroad linking Thessaloniki to Athens. This interfered with overall operations of Nazi Germany, since Athens and its port Piraeus was used as a point of transporting supplies.

By early 1944, due to foreign interference by both Britain and U.S., the resistance groups began to fight amongst themselves. At the end of occupation of the Greek mainland in October 1944, Greece was in a state of political polarization, which soon led to the outbreak of civil war. The civil war gave opportunity to those who had prominently collaborated with Nazi Germany or other occupiers to reach positions of power and avoid sanctions because of anti-communism, even eventually coming to power in post-war Greece after the Communist defeat.

The Greek resistance killed 21,087 Axis soldiers (17,536 Germans, 2,739 Italians, 1,532 Bulgarians) and captured 6,463 (2,102 Germans, 2,109 Italians, 2,252 Bulgarians), compared to the death of 20,650 Greek partisans and an unknown number captured. BBC News estimated that Greece suffered at least 250,000 dead during the Axis occupation.

== Fall of Greece ==
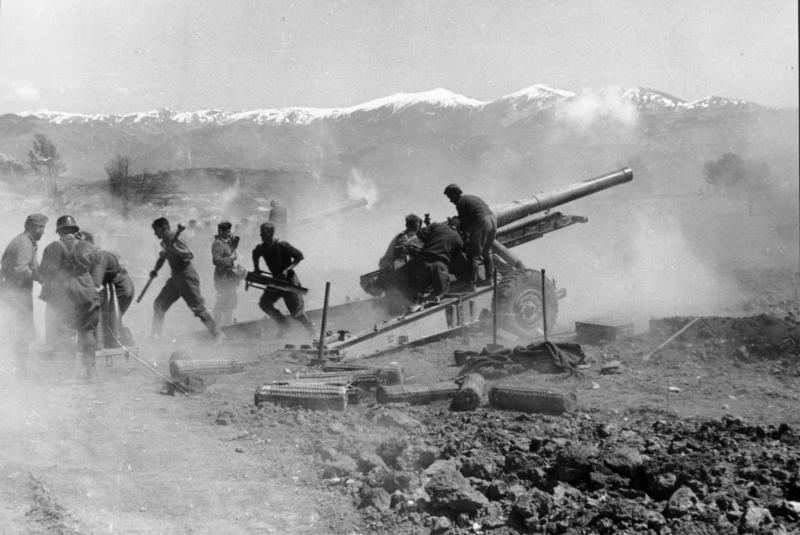
German artillery shelling the Metaxas Line

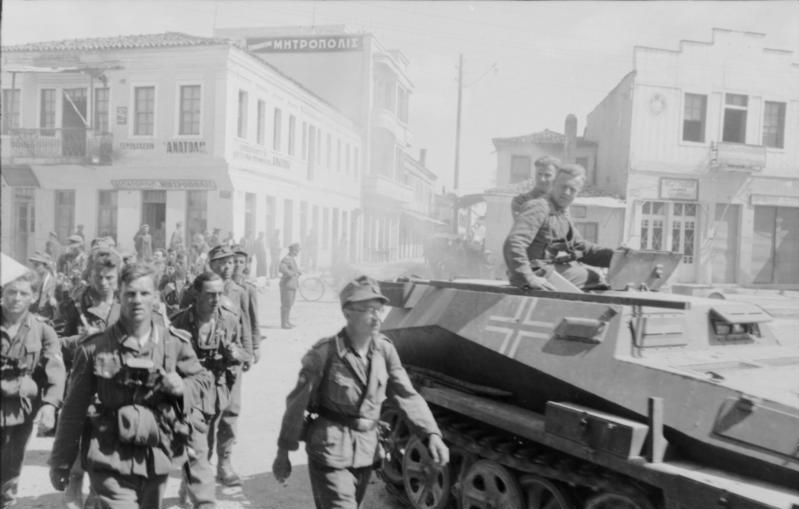
German soldiers in Athens, 1941

In the early morning hours of 28 October 1940, Italian ambassador Emanuele Grazzi woke Greek premier Ioannis Metaxas and presented him with an ultimatum. Metaxas rejected the ultimatum and Italian forces invaded Greek territory from Italian-occupied Albania less than three hours later. (The anniversary of Greece's refusal is now a public holiday in Greece.) Italian Prime Minister Benito Mussolini launched the invasion partly to prove that Italians could match the military successes of the German Army and partly because Mussolini regarded south-eastern Europe as lying within Italy's sphere of influence.

Against Mussolini's expectations, the Hellenic Army successfully exploited the mountainous terrain of Epirus. Greek forces counter-attacked and forced the Italians to retreat. By mid-December, the Greeks had occupied nearly a quarter of Albania, before Italian reinforcements and the harsh winter stemmed the Greek advance. In March 1941, a major Italian counterattack failed. 15 of the 21 Greek divisions were deployed against the Italians, leaving only six divisions to defend against the attack from German troops in the Metaxas Line near the border between Greece and Yugoslavia/Bulgaria in the first days of April. They were supported by British Commonwealth troops sent from Libya on the orders of Winston Churchill.

On 6 April 1941, Germany came to the aid of Italy and invaded Greece through Bulgaria and Yugoslavia, overwhelming Greek and British troops. On 20 April, after cessation of Greek resistance in the north, the Bulgarian Army entered Greek Thrace without firing a shot, with the goal of regaining its Aegean Sea outlet in Western Thrace and Eastern Macedonia. The Bulgarians occupied territory between the Strymon River and a line of demarcation running through Alexandroupoli and Svilengrad west of the Evros River. The Greek capital Athens fell on 27 April, and by 1 June, after the capture of Crete, all of Greece was under Axis occupation. After the invasion, King George II fled, first to Crete and then to Cairo. A Greek right-wing government ruled from Athens as a puppet of the occupying forces.

== Triple occupation ==
=== Establishment of the occupation regime ===
Although the German army was instrumental in the conquest of Greece, this was an accident born of Italy's ill-fated invasion and the subsequent presence of British troops on Greek soil. Greece had not figured in Adolf Hitler's pre-war plans as a target for German annexation: the country was poor, not adjacent to Germany, and did not host any German minorities. The Greeks themselves were seen by Nazi racial theory as neither valuable enough to be Germanized and assimilated, nor as sub-humans to be exterminated. Indeed, Hitler opposed the diversion of efforts towards western and southern Europe, and focused on the conquest and assimilation of Eastern Europe as the future German Lebensraum. Coupled with admiration for the Greek resistance to the Italian invasion, the result was that Hitler favoured postponing a final territorial settlement of Italy's claims on Greece to after the war. In the meantime, a local puppet government headed by Lt. General Georgios Tsolakoglou would be installed as the most efficient way to run the country.

Eager to pull German troops out of the country in view of the imminent invasion of the Soviet Union, and to shore up his relations with his most important Axis partner, Hitler agreed to leave most of the country to be occupied by the Italians. This was undertaken by the Eleventh Army under Carlo Geloso, with three army corps: XXVI Army Corps in Epirus and western Greece, III Army Corps in Thessaly, and VIII Army Corps in the Peloponnese. The north-eastern parts of the country, eastern Macedonia and most of Western Thrace, were handed over to Bulgaria, and were de facto annexed into the Bulgarian state. However, a band of territory along the Evros River, on Greece's border with Turkey, remained under control of the collaborationist Greek government to give the Turkish government a pretext for disregarding her obligations to assist Greece in case of a Bulgarian attack according to the 1934 Balkan Pact. Entry to this zone was forbidden to the Bulgarians, and the Germans maintained only a police and administrative staff there. The Germans also retained control of a patchwork of strategically important areas across the country. The region of Central Macedonia around Greece's second largest city, Thessaloniki, was kept under German control both as a strategic outlet into the Aegean as well as a trump card between the competing claims of both Bulgarians and Italians on it. Along with the eastern Aegean islands of Lemnos, Lesbos, Agios Efstratios, and Chios, the area became 'Salonica-Aegean Military Command' (Befehlsbereich Saloniki-Ägäis) under Curt von Krenzki. Further south, the 'South Greece Military Command' (Befehlsbereich Südgriechenland) under Hellmuth Felmy comprised isolated locations of Athens and the Attica region, such as the Kalamaki Airfield, parts of the port of Piraeus, and the offshore islands of Salamis, Aegina, and Fleves; the island of Milos as a mid-way stronghold to Crete; and most of Crete, except for the eastern Lasithi Prefecture, which was handed over to the Italians. Crete, quickly named "Fortress Crete", came to be regarded as a de facto separate command; upon the insistence of the Kriegsmarine, it was regarded as a target for eventual annexation after the war. The islands of Euboea and Skyros, originally allotted to the German zone, were handed over to Italian control in October 1941; southern Attica was likewise transferred to the Italians in September 1942.

From the outset, the so-called preponderanza, ('preponderance') granted to Italy by Hitler proved an illusion. The Italian plenipotentiary in Greece, Count Pellegrino Ghigi, shared control over the Greek puppet government with his German counterpart, Ambassador Günther Altenburg, while the fragmented occupation regimes meant that different military commanders were responsible for different parts of the country. As the historian Mark Mazower comments, "The stage was set for bureaucratic infighting of Byzantine complexity: Italians pitted against Germans, diplomats against generals, the Greeks trying to play one master off against the other". Relations between the Germans and Italians were not good and there were brawls between German and Italian soldiers; the Germans regarded the Italians as incompetent and frivolous, while the Italians considered the behaviour of their ostensible allies as barbarous. By contrast, the Italians had no such inhibitions, which created problems among Wehrmacht and SS officers. German officers often complained that the Italians were more interested in making love than in making war, and that the Italians lacked the "hardness" to wage a campaign against the Greek guerrillas because many Italian soldiers had Greek girlfriends. After the Italian capitulation in September 1943, the Italian zone was taken over by the Germans, often by attacking the Italian garrisons. There was a failed attempt by the British to take advantage of the Italian surrender to re-enter the Aegean Sea with the Dodecanese Campaign.

=== German occupation zone ===
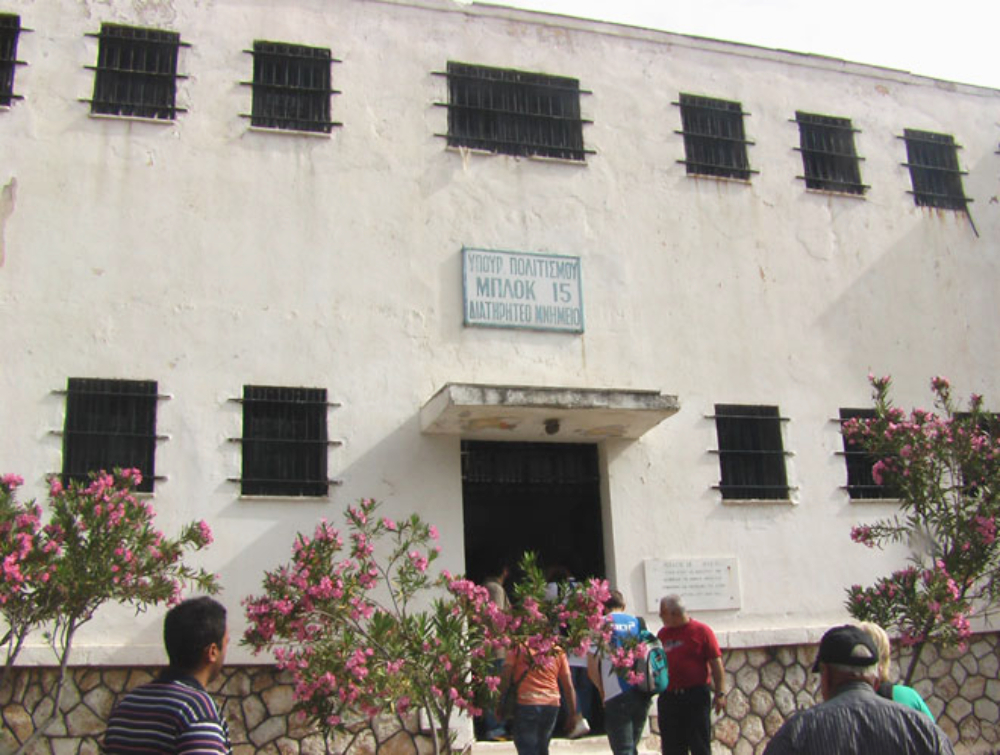
View of the Haidari concentration camp. Operating from September 1943 until September 1944, it was the largest concentration camp and notorious for torture and executions.

From 1942 onwards, the German occupation zone was ruled by the duumvirate of the plenipotentiary for South-Eastern Europe, Hermann Neubacher, and Field Marshal Alexander Löhr. In September-October 1943, Jürgen Stroop, the newly appointed Higher SS Police Leader, tried to challenge the Neubacher-Löhr duumvirate and was swiftly fired after less than a month in the job. Walter Schimana replaced Stroop as the Higher SS Police Leader in Greece and established a better working relationship with the Neubacher-Löhr duumvirate.

==== Economic exploitation and the Great Famine ====
Universal Newsreel about distribution of food to the Greek people in 1944

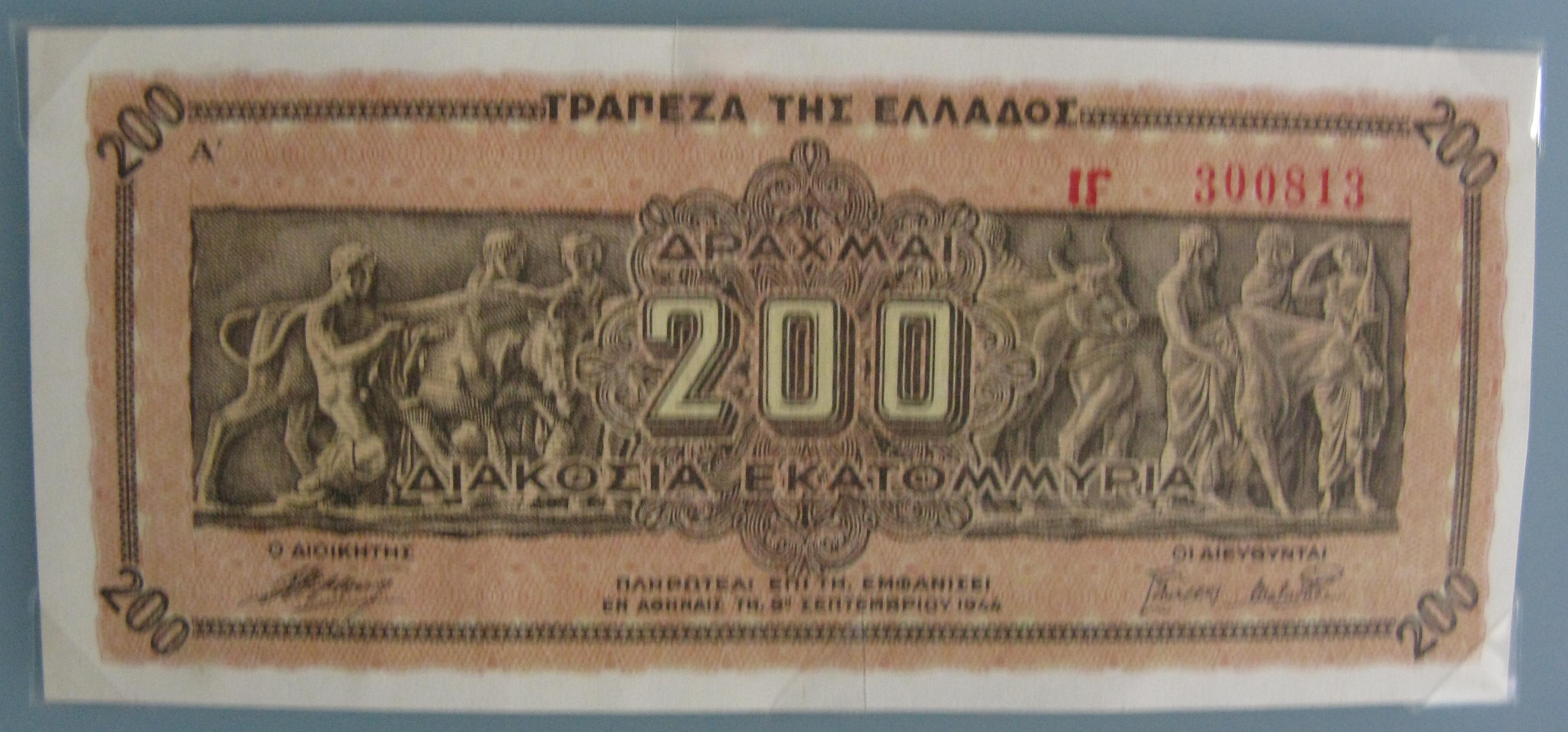
German economic exploitation led to rampant inflation: 200,000,000-drachma banknote, issued in September 1944

Residents of Greece suffered greatly during the occupation. With the country's economy having been reduced from six months of war, and economic exploitation by the occupying forces, raw materials and food were requisitioned, and the collaborationist government paid the costs of the occupation, which resulted in greater inflation. Because the outflows of raw materials and products from Greece towards Germany were not offset by German payments, substantial imbalances accrued in the settlement accounts at the National Bank of Greece. In October 1942 the trading company DEGRIGES was founded; two months later, the Greek collaborationist government agreed to treat the balance as a loan without interest that was to be repaid once the war was over. By the end of the war, this compulsory loan amounted to 476 million Reichsmarks (equivalent to 2 billion 2021 euros).

Hitler's policy toward the economy of occupied Greece was termed Vergeltungsmassnahme, or, roughly, "retaliation measures", the "retaliation" being for Greece having chosen the wrong side. Germany was additionally motivated by a desire to "pluck out the best fruit" to plunder before the Italians could get it. Groups of economic advisers, businessmen, engineers and factory managers came from Germany with the task of seizing anything they deemed of economic value, with involvement from both Germany's Economic Ministry and its Foreign Office involved in the operation. These groups saw themselves as in competition with the Italians to plunder the country, and also with each other. The primary purpose of the German requisitions, however, was finding as much food as possible to sustain the German army. The occupying powers' requisitions, disruption in agricultural production, hoarding by farmers and breakdown of the country's distribution networks from both infrastructure damage and change in government structure led to a severe shortage of food in the major urban centres in the winter of 1941–42. Some of this shortage is attributable to the Allied blockade of Europe since Greece depended on wheat imports to cover about a third of its annual needs. These factors created the conditions for the Great Famine (Μεγάλος Λιμός) where in the greater Athens–Piraeus area alone, some 40,000 people died of starvation, and by the end of the occupation "it was estimated that the total population of Greece [...] was 300,000 less than it should have been because of famine or malnutrition".

Greece received some foreign aid to make up some of the shortfall, coming at first from neutral countries like Sweden and Turkey (see SS Kurtuluş), but most of the food ended up in the hands of government officials and black market traders, who used their connection to the authorities to "buy" the aid from them and then sell it on at inflated prices. The perception of suffering and pressure from the Kingdom of Greece's government in exile eventually led to the British partially lifting the blockade, and from the summer of 1942 Canadian wheat began to be distributed by the International Red Cross. Of the country's 7.3 million inhabitants in 1941, it is estimated that 2.5 million received this aid, of whom half lived in Athens, meaning that almost all people in the capital city received this aid. Although the food aid reduced the risk of starvation in the cities, little of it reached the countryside, which experienced its own period of famine in 1943–44. The rise of the armed Resistance resulted in major anti-partisan campaigns across the countryside by the Axis, which led to wholesale burning of villages, destruction of fields, and mass executions in retaliation for guerrilla attacks. As P. Voglis writes, the German sweeps "[turned] producing areas into burned fields and pillaged villages, and the wealthy provincial towns into refugee settlements".

=== Italian occupation zone ===
==== Annexationist and separatist projects ====
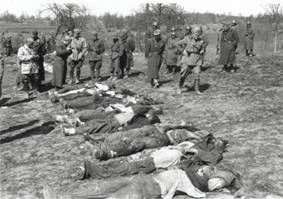
Dead civilians after the Domenikon massacre

After the German invasion, the Italian government put forward vague demands for annexations in north-western Greece, as well as the Ionian Islands, but these were turned down by the Germans, as they would have been a hindrance to concluding an armistice and establishing a collaborationist government: any such concession would have terminated the puppet government's legitimacy. Likewise, Italian suggestions for an outright military occupation without a Greek administration were rejected. Hitler and the German Foreign Minister, Joachim von Ribbentrop, even cautioned the Italians of the dangers of annexing territories inhabited by large Greek populations, which might become hotbeds of resistance. Nevertheless, in the Ionian Islands the Greek civil authorities were replaced by Italians, presumptively in preparation for annexation after the war. Claiming the inheritance of the Republic of Venice, which had ruled the islands for centuries, the senior Fascist Party official Pietro Parini took steps to uncouple the islands from the rest of Greece: his decrees had the force of law, a new currency, the "Ionian Drachma", was introduced in early 1942, and a policy of Italianization initiated in public education and the press. Similar steps were undertaken in the eastern Aegean island of Samos. However, due to German insistence, no official annexation took place during the occupation.

Italian policy promised that the region of Chameria (Thesprotia) in north-western Greece would be awarded to Albania after the end of the war. Similarly to the Ionian Islands, a local administration (Këshilla) was installed, and armed groups were formed by the local Cham Albanian community. For at least the beginning of the occupation, Muslim communities chose different political alignments according to the circumstances, alternating between collaboration, neutrality and, less frequently, resistance. Albanian and Greek communities allied with the strongest available patron and shifted their allegiances when a better one appeared. Many events were part of a cycle of revenge between local communities over land ownership, state policies, sectarian hostilities and personal vendettas. This cycle of revenge became nationalized during the war with different communities choosing different sides. Although the majority of Cham Albanian elites collaborated with the Axis, some Chams joined a mixed EAM battalion at the end of the war, but never ended up making a significant contribution to the resistance against Germany. (For local developments in 1944–1945: see Expulsion of Cham Albanians). After the war, a Special Court on Collaborators in Ioannina condemned 2,109 Cham collaborators to death in absentia. However, by the time of conviction, they had already relocated abroad.

Some of the Vlach (Aromanian) population in the Pindus mountains and Western Macedonia also collaborated with the Axis powers. Italian occupation forces were welcomed in some Aromanian villages as liberators, and Aromanians offered their services as guides or interpreters in exchange for favors. Under Alcibiades Diamandi, the pro-Italian Principality of the Pindus was declared, and 2000 locals joined his Roman Legion, while another band of Aromanian followers under Nicolaos Matussis carried out raids in service of Italy. While most local Aromanians remained loyal to the Greek nation, some collaborated with the Axis powers because of latent pro-Romanian feelings or anger toward the Greek government and its military. Diamandi's Legion collapsed in 1942 when Italian positions were taken over by Germany, and most of its leaders fled to Romania or Greek cities. Most active members were convicted as war criminals in absentia, but many convictions were forgotten over the course of the Greek Civil War, in which many convicted Legion members actively fought for the government.

==== Oppression and reprisals ====
Compared to the other two occupation zones, the Italian regime was relatively safe for its Greek residents, with a relatively low number of executions and atrocities compared to the German and Bulgarian zones.

Unlike the Germans, the Italian military mostly protected Jews in their zone, and rejected the introduction of measures such as those established in the German occupation zone in Thessaloniki. The Germans were purportedly perturbed as the Italians not only protected Jews on their territory, but in parts of occupied France, Greece, the Balkans, and elsewhere. On 13 December 1942, Joseph Goebbels, Hitler's propaganda minister, wrote in his diary, "The Italians are extremely lax in the treatment of the Jews. They protect the Italian Jews both in Tunis and in occupied France and will not permit their being drafted for work or compelled to wear the Star of David. This shows once again that Fascism does not really dare to get down to fundamentals but is very superficial regarding problems of vital importance."

Mass reprisals did sometimes occur, such as the Domenikon massacre in which 150 Greek civilians were killed. As they controlled most of the countryside, Italy was the first to face the rising resistance movement in 1942–1943. By mid-1943, the resistance had managed to expel a few Italian garrisons from some mountainous areas, including several towns, creating liberated zones ("Free Greece"). After the Italian armistice in September 1943, the Italian zone was taken over by the Germans. As a result, German anti-partisan and antisemitic policies were extended to it.

=== Bulgarian occupation zone ===
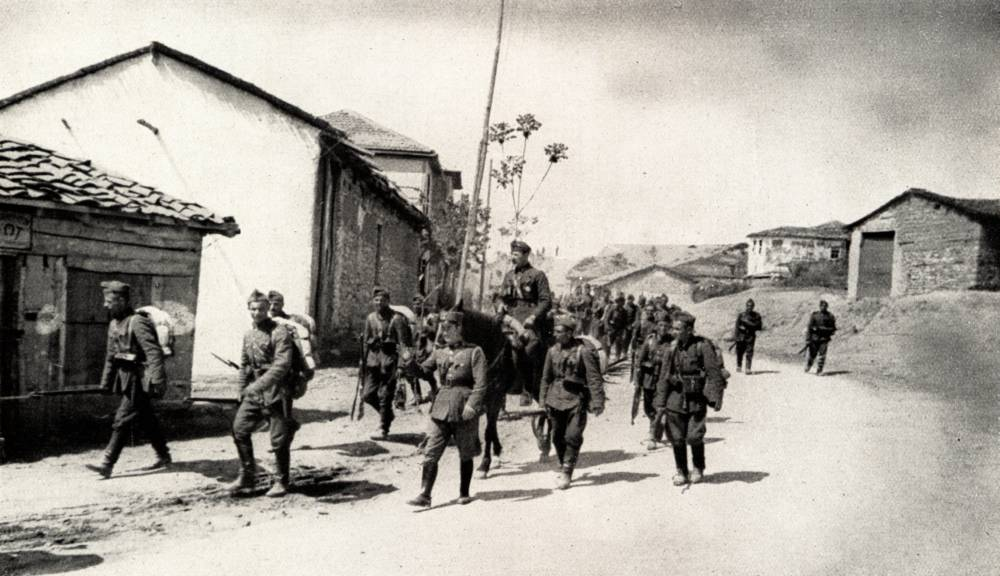
Bulgarian troops entering a village in northern Greece in April 1941

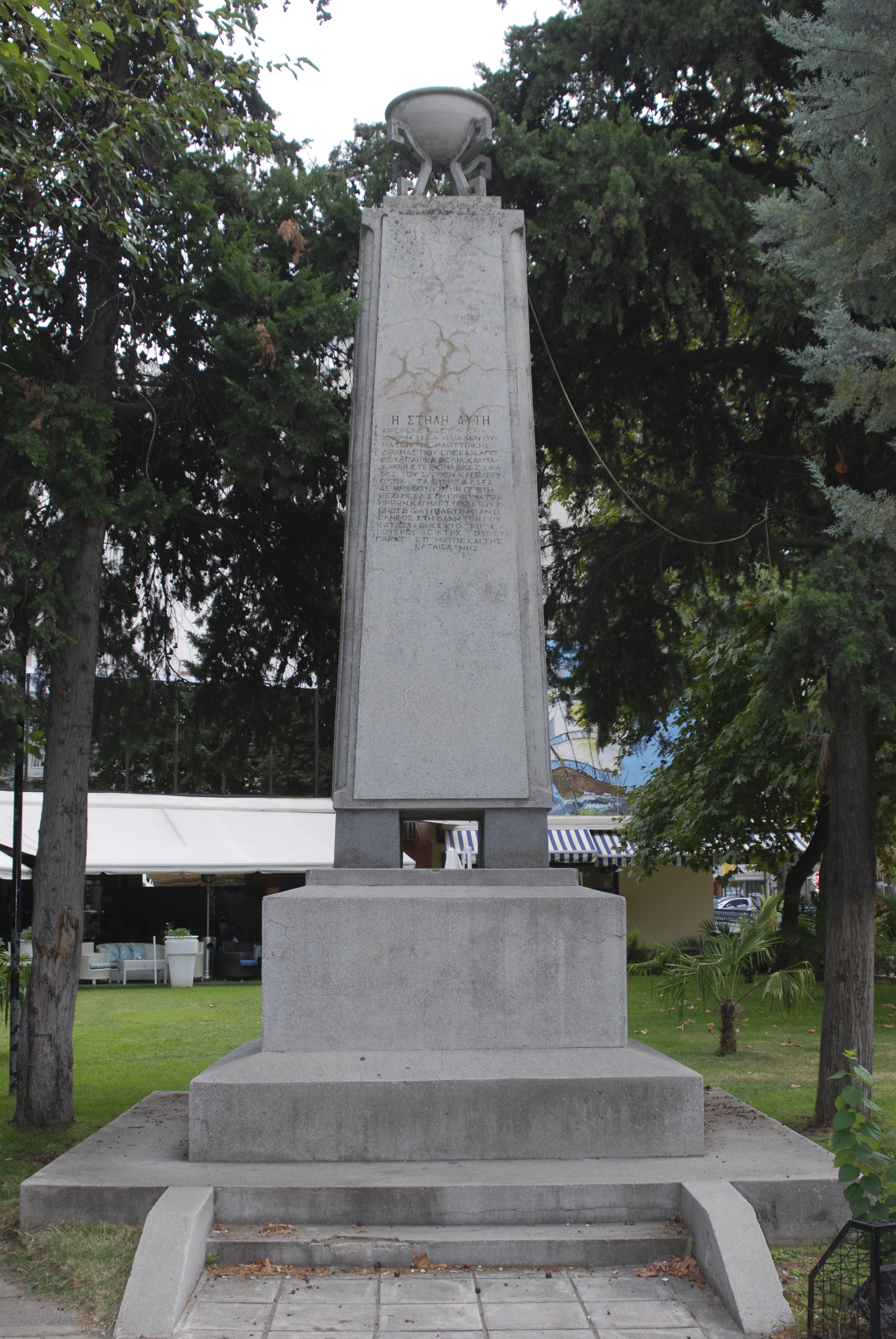
Monument to the victims of Bulgarian reprisals against the Drama Uprising

The Bulgarian Army entered Greece on 20 April 1941 on the heels of the Wehrmacht without having fired a shot. The Bulgarian occupation zone included the northeastern corner of the Greek mainland and the islands of Thasos and Samothrace, which corresponds to the present-day region of East Macedonia and Thrace, except for the Evros prefecture at the Greek-Turkish border, which was retained by the Germans over Bulgarian protests because of its strategic value. Unlike Germany and Italy, Bulgaria officially annexed the occupied territories on 14 May 1941, which had long been a target of Bulgarian foreign policy. East Macedonia and Thrace had been part of the Ottoman Empire until 1913, when it became part of Bulgaria following the First Balkan War until being annexed by Greece in two stages. Later in 1913, Greece annexed parts of Western Thrace after the Second Balkan War, and then in 1920 at the San Remo conference, Greece formally received the remainder of present-day Western Thrace province after its victory in WWI.

Throughout the Bulgarian occupation zone, Bulgaria had a policy of extermination, expulsion and ethnic cleansing, aiming to forcibly Bulgarize, expel or kill ethnic Greeks. This Bulgarisation campaign deported all Greek mayors, landowners, industrialists, school teachers, judges, lawyers, priests and Hellenic Gendarmerie officers. The usage of the Greek language was banned, and the names of towns and places were changed to traditional Bulgarian forms. Gravestones bearing Greek inscriptions were defaced as a part of the effort.

The Bulgarian government tried to alter the ethnic composition of the region by aggressively expropriating land and houses from Greek people in favor of settlers from Bulgaria, and enacted forced labor and economic restrictions on Greek businesses, in an effort to influence them to migrate to the German- and Italian-occupied parts of Greece. A licensing system banned the practice of trades and professions without permission, along with confiscation of estates of Greek landowners, which were given to Bulgarian peasants settlers from within the pre-war boundaries of Bulgaria.

As a reaction to these policies, there was a spontaneous and poorly organized attempt to expel the Bulgarians with an uprising around Drama in late September 1941 primarily guided by the Communist Party of Greece. This uprising was suppressed by the Bulgarian Army, followed by massive reprisals against Greek civilians. By late 1942, more than 100,000 Greeks were expelled from the Bulgarian occupation zone. Bulgarian colonists were encouraged to settle in East Macedonia and Thrace with credits and incentives from the central Bulgarian government, including confiscated land and houses.

The Bulgarian government's attempts to win the loyalty of the local Slavic language-speaking populations and recruit collaborators among them had some success, with the Bulgarian armed forces being greeted as liberators in some areas. However, the ethnic composition of the region meant that the most of its inhabitants actively resisted the occupying forces. East Macedonia and Thrace had an ethnically mixed population until the early 20th century, including Greeks, Turks, Slavic-speaking Christians (some of whom self-identified as Greeks, others as Bulgarians), Jews, and Pomaks (a Muslim Slavic group). However, during the interwar years, the ethnic composition of the region's population had dramatically shifted, as Greek refugees from Turkey and Bulgaria settled in Macedonia and Thrace following the population exchange between Greece and Turkey. This left only a minority of local Slavic language speakers as the target of the Bulgarian government's recruitment and collaboration efforts.

Because of these occupation policies, there was armed resistance in the Bulgarian zone was that enjoyed widespread support from the civilians in the region; Greek guerrillas engaged the Bulgarian military in many battles, even entering pre-war Bulgarian territory, raided villages and captured booty. In 1943, previously united Greek factions began armed conflict between communist and right-wing groups with the aim of securing control of the region following the anticipated Bulgarian withdrawal.

There were a few instances of collaboration by the Muslim minority in Western Thrace, who mainly resided in the Komotini and Xanthi prefectures.

==== Bulgarian activities in German-occupied Macedonia ====
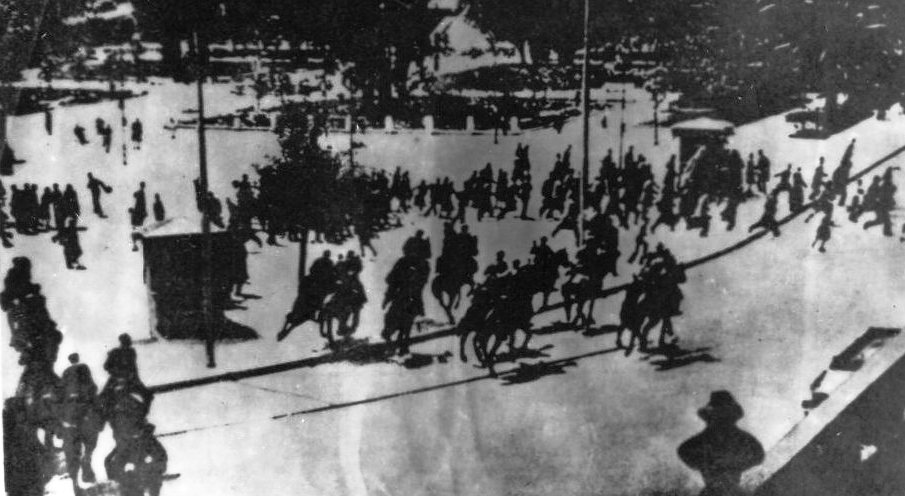
22 July 1943 Athens protest against the Bulgarian expansion

The Bulgarian government also attempted to extend its influence to central and west Macedonia. The German High Command approved the foundation of a Bulgarian military club in Thessaloniki, and Bulgarian officers organized supplying of food and provisions for the Slavic-speaking population in these regions, aiming to recruit collaborators and gather intelligence on what was happening in the German- and Italian-occupied zones. In 1942, the Bulgarian club asked for assistance from the High Command in organizing armed units among those populations, but the Germans were initially very suspicious. Taking advantages of Italian incompetence and the German need for releasing troops on other fronts, since 1943 Sofia had been seeking to extend its control over the rest of Macedonia. After the Italian collapse in 1943, the Germans allowed the Bulgarians to intervene in Greek Central Macedonia, over the area between the Strymon and Axios rivers. The situation also forced the Germans to take control of Western Macedonia with the occasional interventions of Bulgarian troops. At that time the Greek guerrilla forces, especially the left-wing Greek People's Liberation Army (ELAS) were gaining more and more strength in the area. As a result, armed collaborationist militias composed of pro-Bulgarian Slavic-speakers, known as Ohrana, were formed in 1943 in the districts of Pella, Florina and Kastoria. The ELAS units joined EAM in 1944 before the end of the occupation.

==== Bulgarian withdrawal ====
The Soviet Union declared war on the Kingdom of Bulgaria in early September 1944. Bulgaria withdrew from the central parts of Greek Macedonia after the pro-Soviet coup in the country on 9 September 1944. At that time it declared war on Germany, but the Bulgarian army remained in Eastern Macedonia and Thrace, where there were several limited attacks from withdrawing German troops in the middle of September. Bulgaria hoped to keep these territories after the war. The Soviet Union initially also believed it was possible to include at least Western Thrace in the post-war borders of Bulgaria and thereby to secure a strategic outlet to the Aegean Sea. But the United Kingdom, whose troops advanced towards Greece at the same time, stated that the withdrawal of Bulgarian troops from all occupied territories was a precondition for a ceasefire agreement with Bulgaria. As result on 10 October, the Bulgarian army and administration began evacuating and after two weeks withdrew from the area. Meanwhile, around 90,000 Bulgarians left the area, nearly half of them settlers and the rest locals. The administrative power was handed over by the already ruling Bulgarian communist partisans to local subdivisions of ELAS.

In 1945 the former Bulgarian authorities, including those in Greece, were put on trial before People's Courts in post-war Bulgaria for their actions during the war. Thousands of people were sentenced to prison, while some 2,000 received death sentences.

==== Regional level policies ====
Many Slavophones of Macedonia, in particular of Kastoria and Florina provinces, collaborated with Axis forces and came out openly for Bulgaria. These Slavophones considered themselves Bulgarian. In the first two years of occupation, a group of this community believed that the Axis would win the war, spelling the demise of Greek rule in the region and its annexation by Bulgaria. The first non-communist resistance organization that emerged in the area had as main opponents members of the Aromanian- and Slav-speaking minorities, as well as the communists, rather than the Germans themselves. Because of the strong presence of German troops and the general distrust of Slavophones by the Greeks, the communist organisations EAM and ELAS had difficulties in Florina and Kastoria. The majority of the Slav-speakers in Macedonia after mid-1943 joined EAM and were allowed to retain their organization. In October 1944 they deserted and departed to Yugoslavia. In November 1945, after the end of the war, some of then tried to capture Florina but were repulsed by the ELAS.

== Nazi atrocities ==
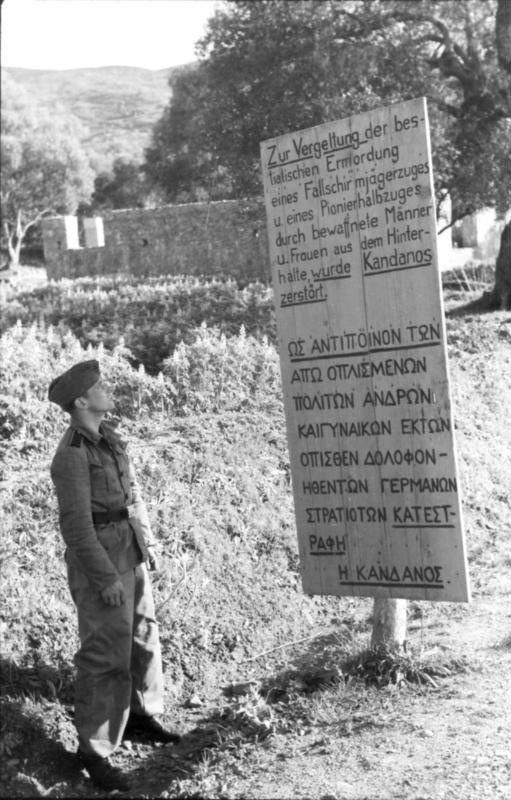
Bilingual sign erected at the village of Kandanos in Crete, razed in reprisal for the locals' armed resistance against invading Nazi Germans. The German part of the sign reads: "Kandanos was destroyed in retaliation for the bestial ambush murder of a paratrooper platoon and a half-platoon of military engineers by armed men and women."

Increasing attacks by partisans in the latter years of the occupation resulted in a number of executions and wholesale slaughter of civilians in reprisal. In total, the Germans executed some 21,000 Greeks, the Bulgarians executed some 40,000 and the Italians executed some 9,000. By June 1944, between them the Axis powers had "raided 1,339 towns, boroughs and villages, of which 879, or two-thirds, were completely wiped out, leaving more than a million people homeless" (P. Voglis) in the course of their anti-partisan sweeps, mostly in the areas of Central Greece, Western Macedonia and the Bulgarian occupation zone.

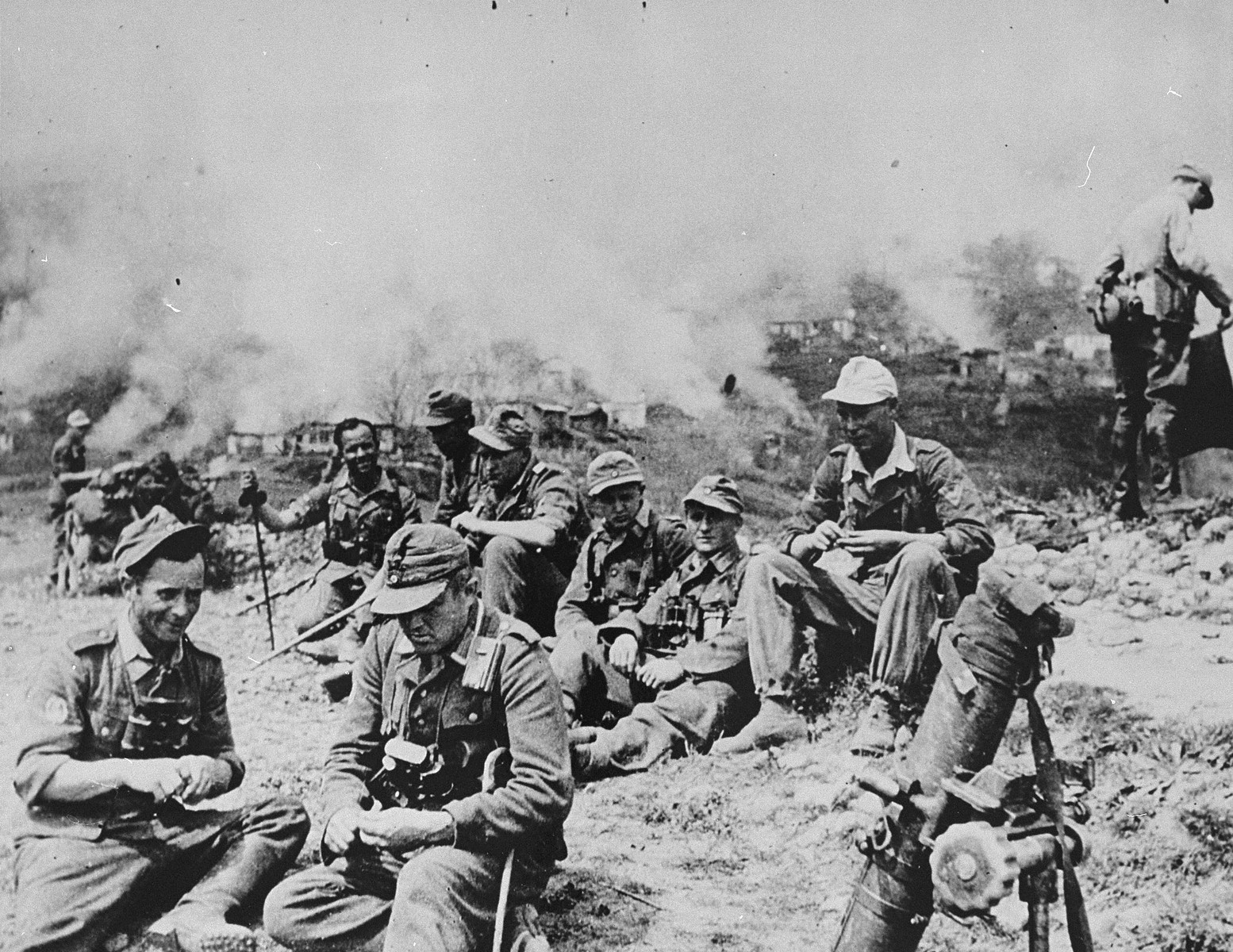
German mountain troops after destroying a village in Epirus

The most infamous examples in the German zone are those of the village of Kommeno on 16 August 1943, where 317 inhabitants were executed by the 1. Gebirgs-Division and the village torched; the "Holocaust of Viannos" on 14–16 September 1943, in which over 500 civilians from several villages in the region of Viannos and Ierapetra in Crete were executed by the 22. Luftlande Infanterie-Division; the "Massacre of Kalavryta" on 13 December 1943, in which Wehrmacht troops of the 117th Jäger Division carried out the extermination of the entire male population and the subsequent total destruction of the town; the "Distomo massacre" on 10 June 1944, where units of the Waffen-SS Polizei Division looted and burned the village of Distomo in Boeotia resulting in the deaths of 218 civilians; the 3 October 1943 "Lingiades massacre" where the German army murdered in reprisal nearly 100 people in the village of Lingiades, 13 kilometres outside Ioannina; and the "Holocaust of Kedros" on 22 August 1944 in Crete, where 164 civilians were executed and nine villages were dynamited after being looted. At the same time, in the course of the concerted anti-guerrilla campaign, hundreds of villages were systematically torched and almost 1,000,000 Greeks left homeless.

Two other notable acts of brutality were the massacres of Italian troops at the islands of Cephalonia and Kos in September 1943, during the German takeover of the Italian occupation areas. In Cephalonia, the 12,000-strong Italian 33rd Infantry Division "Acqui" was attacked on 13 September by elements of the 1. Gebirgs-Division with support from Stukas, and forced to surrender on 21 September after suffering some 1,300 casualties. The next day, the Germans began executing their prisoners and did not stop until more than 4,500 Italians had been shot. The 4,000 or so survivors were put aboard ships for the mainland, but some of them sank after hitting mines in the Ionian Sea, where another 3,000 were lost. The Cephalonia massacre serves as the background for the novel Captain Corelli's Mandolin.

== Collaboration ==
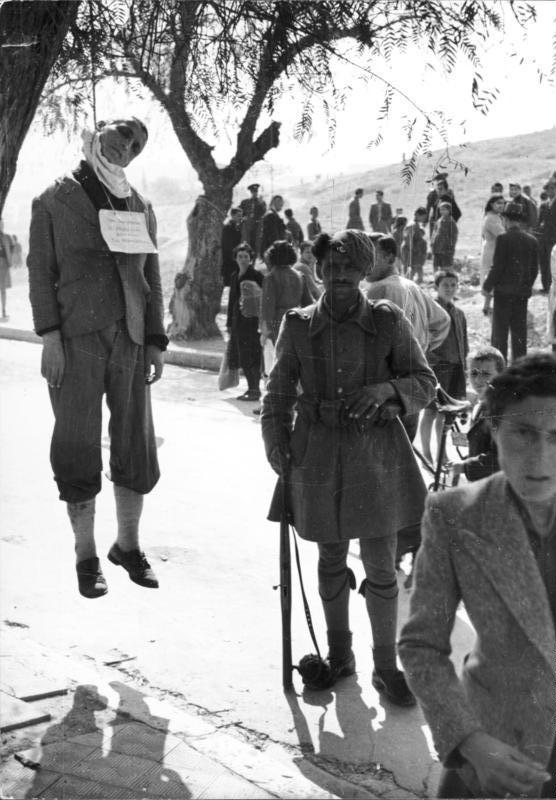
A member of the Security Battalions standing near an executed man

=== Government ===
The Third Reich had no long-term plans for Greece and Hitler had already decided that a domestic puppet regime would be the least expensive drain on German efforts and resources as the invasion of the Soviet Union was imminent. According to a report by Foreign Office delegate of the 12th Army, Felix Benzler, the formation of a puppet government wasn't an easy task "because it is very difficult to persuade qualified civilians to participate in any form". The most influential Greek personalities hardly wished to make their re-entry into public life at such a moment, while archbishop Chrysanthos of Athens refused to swear such an Axis puppet. Suspicious of the Greeks' capacity for causing problems, the Axis decided to withhold international recognition from the new regime, which remained without a Foreign Minister for its entire lifetime.

General Georgios Tsolakoglou – who had signed the armistice treaty with the Wehrmacht – was appointed as prime minister of the Nazi puppet regime in Athens. Neither Tsolakoglou nor his cabinet of equally inexperienced generals had any previous political experience. The civilian ministers were also an unimpressive group without political background. The government itself was wracked by internal disputes and held in low esteem by the Greek public, especially after the Italians replaced the Germans throughout much of the country in June 1941. The puppet government was kept under strict Axis control. Two Axis plenipotentiaries, Gunther Altenburg and Pellegrino Ghigi, had the power to recommend the appointment and dismissal of Greek officials and were the key civilian figures in shaping Axis policy towards Greece. In addition, there was no clear distinction between the civil and military administration, while even the military administration was divided among various sectors (Italian 11th army, German 12th army, "fortress Crete" etc.). In December 1942, Tsolakologlou was succeeded by Konstantinos Logothetopoulos, a professor of medicine whose main qualification for Prime Minister seemed to be his marriage to the niece of German Field Marshal Wilhelm List. Ioannis Rallis became head of the regime as of April 1943 and was responsible for the creation of the Greek collaborationist Security Battalions.

=== Civil administration and armed groups ===
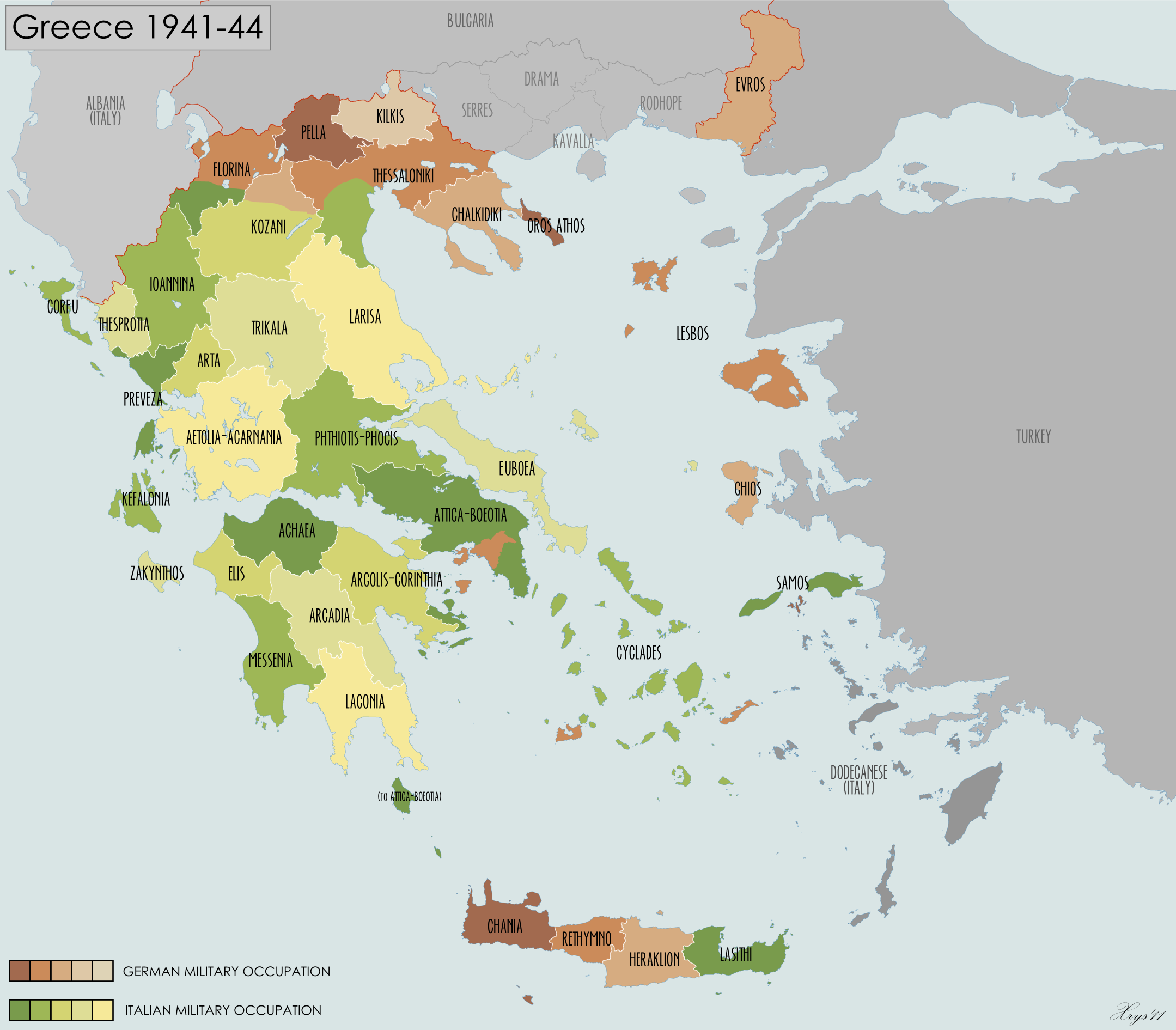
Prefectures of Greece, 1941–44

As in other European countries, there were Greeks willing to collaborate with the occupying force. However, few of the members of the Security battalions shared a pro-German ideology. The majority convinced themselves that the British approved anti-communist activity; others enlisted because of opportunistic advancement, while most of them came from a pro-royalist background.

Occupation authorities were reluctant to arm potential groups willing to fight the left-wing EAM resistance due to the absence of a fascist movement in Greece and the general dislike of the Germans by the Greek population. Fascist organizations supported by the Germans were the National Union of Greece (Ethniki Enosis Ellados, EEE), the EKK (Ethnikon Kyriarchon Kratos), the Greek National Socialist Party (Elliniko Ethnikososialistiko Komma, EEK) led by George S. Mercouris, and other minor pro-Nazi, fascist or antisemitic organizations such as the Hellenic Socialist Patriotic Organization (ESPO) or the "Iron Peace" (Sidira Eirini). Cooperation of civil servants with the resistance, in particular the EAM, occurred even before a widescale resistance movement unfolded.

For the purposes of civil administration before the invasion, Greece was divided into 37 prefectures. Following the occupation, the prefectures of Drama, Kavalla, Rhodope and Serres were annexed by Bulgaria and no longer under the control of the Greek government. The remaining 33 prefectures had a concurrent military administration by Italian or German troops. In 1943, Attica and Boeotia was split into separate prefectures.

== Resistance ==
=== Outbreak of the resistance ===
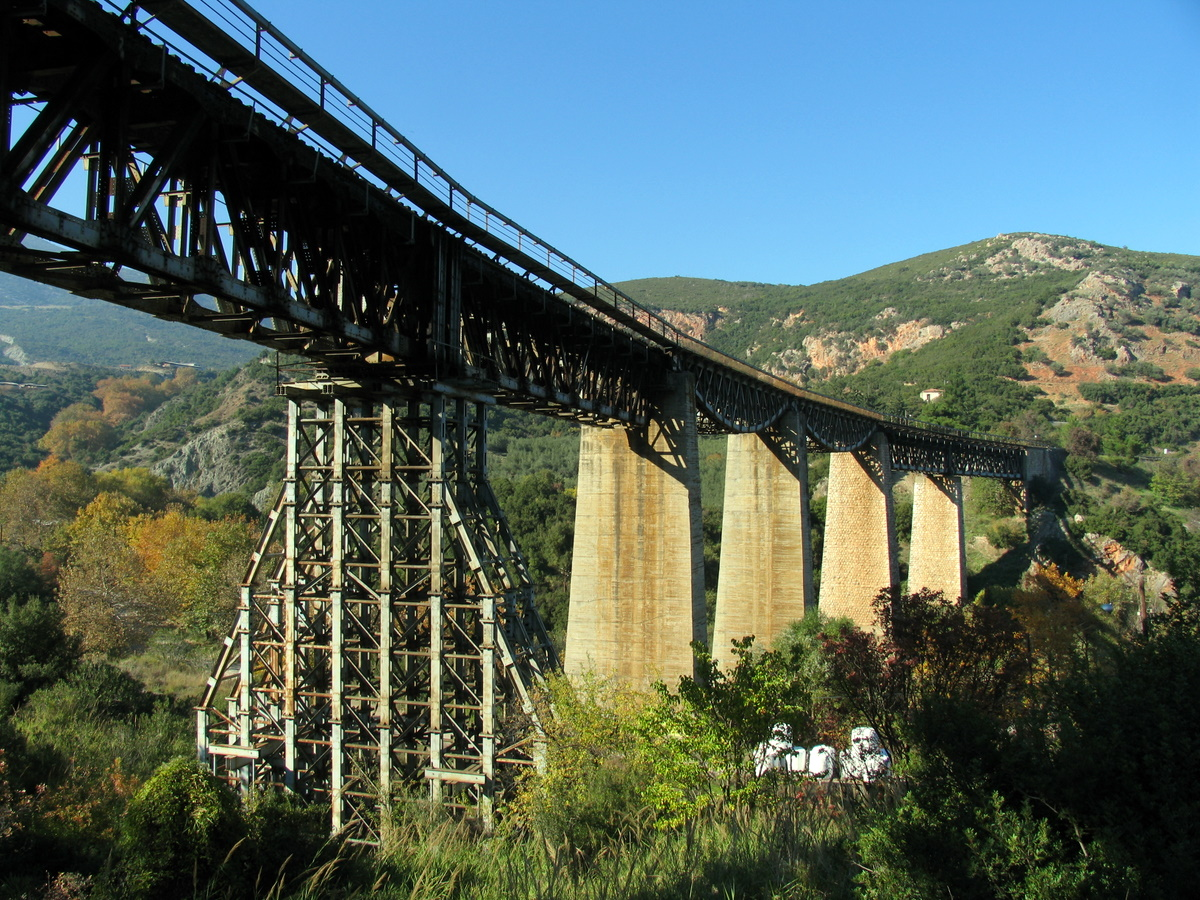
The rail bridge of Gorgopotamos that was blown up (Operation Harling), in November 1942

Few Greeks actively cooperated with the Nazis: most chose either the path of acceptance or resistance. Greek resistance started immediately as many Greeks fled to the hills, where a partisan movement was born. One of the most touching episodes of the early resistance is said to have taken place just after the Wehrmacht reached the Acropolis on 27 April. The Germans ordered the flag guard, Evzone Konstandinos Koukidis, to retire the Greek flag. The Greek soldier obeyed, but when he was done, he wrapped himself in the flag and threw himself off the plateau where he died. Some days later, when the Reichskriegsflagge was waving on the Acropolis' uppermost spot, two Athenian youngsters, Manolis Glezos and Apostolos Santas, climbed by night on the Acropolis and tore down the flag.

The first signs of armed resistance manifested themselves in northern Greece, where resentment at the Bulgarian annexations ran high, in early autumn 1941. The Germans responded swiftly, torching several villages and executing 488 civilians. The brutality of these reprisals led to a collapse of the early guerrilla movement. It was revived in 1942 at a much greater scale. The first event that signaled the beginning of organized, armed opposition to the occupation forces occurred in September 1942 when the Greek Fascist Party (EEE) Club in Athens was blown up by the Panhellenic Union of Fighting Youths (PEAN), a right-wing Greek resistance organization. Attacks on Axis personnel became more frequent from that month.

On 25 November, the resistance together with the British mission destroyed the Gorgopotamos viaduct in Central Greece, in Operation Harling, disrupting the flow of Axis supplies to the North Africs. By March–April, the andartes were attacking Italian guard posts and barracks, while on 16 April, an Italian report noted that "control throughout the north-east, centre and south-west of Greece remains very precarious, not to say nonexistent".

=== Major resistance groups ===
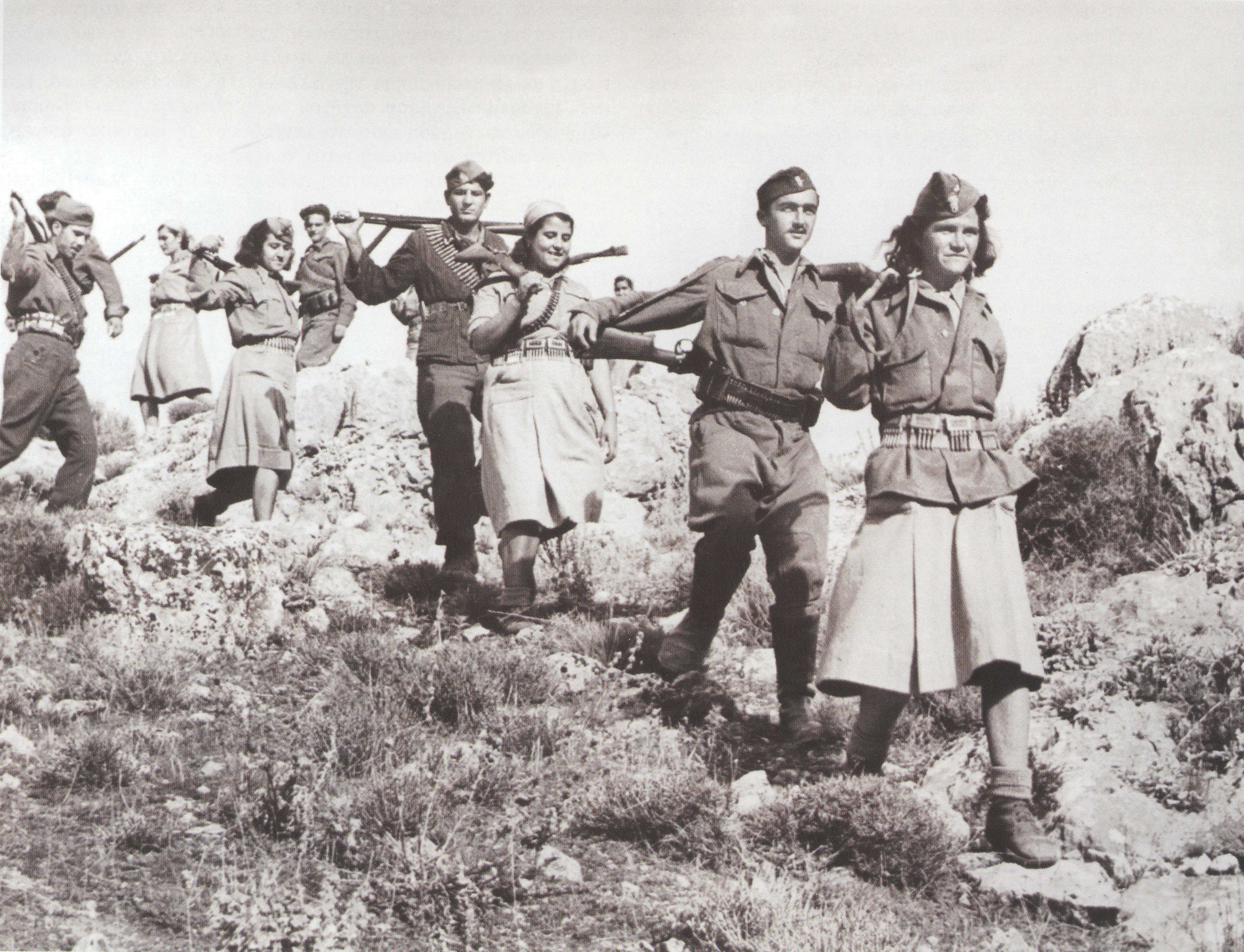
ELAS fighters in mountainous Greece

On 27 September 1941, the National Liberation Front (EAM) was established. It was nominally a "popular front" organization composed of a coalition of the Communist Party of Greece (KKE) and five other left-wing parties. EAM was virtually controlled by the KKE, although initially, the secretive and generally unpopular Communist party was successful in concealing this fact.

The military wing of EAM was the Greek People's Liberation Army (ELAS). Its first guerrilla band had been formed in Central Greece, under the leadership of Aris Velouchiotis, a declared Communist. EAM increased in size and its central committee sought a more experienced military figure to take command. Napoleon Zervas, the leader of a rival guerrilla group, was approached but could not be enticed to join ELAS. The post was filled by Stefanos Sarafis, a former Greek army officer and non-communist. Immediately upon assuming command of ELAS, Sarafis set about reforming its haphazardly organized and commanded bands.

By September 1943, the reorganization of ELAS bands along conventional lines had been completed, and ELAS strength was about 15,000 fighters with additionally 20,000 reserves. Eventually, the EAM incorporated 90% of the Greek resistance movement, boasted a total membership of over 1,500,000, including 50,000 armed guerrillas, and controlled much of rural mainland Greece and attracted large numbers of non-Communists. The first contact between Soviet officers and members of the Communist Party and the EAM-ELAS forces occurred at 28 July 1943.

The National Republican Greek League (EDES) was led by Napoleon Zervas, a former army officer and republican. EDES was formed on 9 September 1941 and was at the beginning thoroughly republican and anti-monarchist, but also attracted a few monarchists and other right-wing supporters. The British were instrumental in the development of EDES, hoping it would become a counterweight to ELAS. Throughout the occupation period, Zervas did not attempt to change his doctrine and EDES remained clearly a guerrilla force. Its main theatre of operation was Epirus. Because it was a particularly poor district, most of the logistical support was provided by the British. When EDES was finally disbanded at the fall of 1944, it had about 12,000 fighters, in addition to 5,000 reserves.

Another armed resistance group was the National and Social Liberation (EKKA), led by Colonel Dimitrios Psarros. In general, most of the major guerrilla groups were at least moderately republican in orientation, whereas the Greek government-in-exile had been connected with monarchism, the Metaxas dictatorship, defeatism, and abandonment of the homeland to the invader.

=== Developments and signs of civil war ===
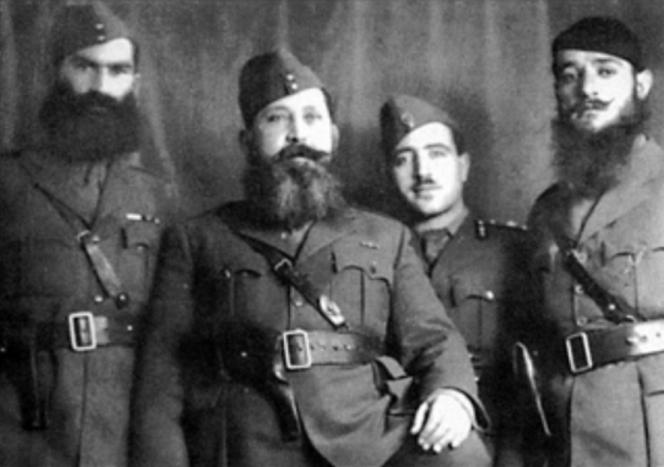
Napoleon Zervas with fellow officers

From its very beginnings, ELAS had sought to absorb or eliminate the rest of the Greek resistance groups and achieved some success in that effort. It firmly established and maintained a clear advantage over its rivals in terms of overall numbers, organization and the amount of territory controlled. ELAS's execution of rival EKKAS's leader, Dimitrios Psarros, later in spring of 1944 was a typical example of its ruthless determination to monopolise the armed resistance. Generally, ELAS clashed with the other resistance groups nearly as often as it fired upon the occupation forces.

Velouchiotis, though a charismatic leader, was regarded with suspicion by a large part of EAM/ELAS and the Communist party. His early pre-eminence in the resistance had been achieved through exemplary executions and the torture of traitors, informers, and others. ELAS's critics also accused Velouchiotis, claiming the organization was not above open collusion with the Axis. Meanwhile, on 9 March 1943, Zervas repudiated EDES's earlier republicanism of loyalty to the exiled King George. He thus managed to achieve closer ties with the British mission. With the surrender of Italy in September 1943, Italian forces in Greece either surrendered to the Joint Resistance headquarters (composed of ELAS, EDES, EKKA and the British) or to the Germans.

EAM accused its rival organizations, and particularly EDES, of collaboration with the occupation forces. However, this accusation was as yet unfounded, at least in regards to EDES's guerilla branch. Right-wing resistance groups, including EDES, lacked a nationwide organizational apparatus and did not follow a consistent strategy, while their relative weakness compared to EAM resulted in complete dependence on the British and to surreptitious collaboration with the Axis. Over time, the EDES Central Committee and political apparatus in Athens, directed by Stylianos Gonatas, became increasingly ineffective, estranged from the EDES guerrillas in the mountains (headed by Zervas) and winning the particular enmity of the organization because of Gonatas's support for the collaborationist Security Battalions. EDES called for a future democratic constitution and the punishment of wartime collaborators.

On 12 October 1943, elements of ELAS struck EDES units in the mountains of Thessaly, beginning what came to be called the "First Round" of the Greek civil war. As a result, EDES was confined to Epirus, Zervas's birthplace, and only managed to survive due to British support. British officials stated that the Germans would soon leave the country and that "at all costs Greece must not become communist".

During this period, the British intelligence suspected the EAM/ELAS resistance for collaboration with the Axis. As such EAM/ELAS refused to provide support to the British units and on some occasions even betrayed them to the Germans. There is documentary evidence that Zervas had certain understandings with the Axis commanders and with British support, he turned against ELAS during a ceasefire with the Germans. Zervas, undoubtedly aimed to get rid of the Axis, but lacked the qualities and the organizational background to form a strong resistance movement and saw EDES as a tool to fight the occupation troops and advance his own fortunes. For Zervas the first priority was EAM/ELAS. Reports sent on 10 August 1943 by the German Chief of Staff in Giannina suggested that he believed Zervas was 'loyal' to their operations. According to German post-war testimonies, resistance was temporarily limited in Epirus and the local population was terrorized partly due to the reprisals and executions in Paramythia in September 1943. During October 1943-October 1944 Zervas consistently rejected active collaboration though he favoured a temporary coexistence. According to German records, a conspiracy of German-Ralli's collaborationist government-British can't be sustained. This policy of coexistence enabled the Germans to concentrate their operations against ELAS. Zervas' pro-royalist tendencies and close collaboration both with the Germans and the British Office destroyed EDES' initial republican and democratic ideology. In 1944, EDES membership no longer represented the anti-monarchists but had come to reflect a broad spectrum of right-wing forces which opposed both the Germans and ELAS. A short-lived German attempt to coopt EDES and use them against ELAS partisans failed and by July 1944 EDES attacks against the Germans resumed. A German report of 17 July 1944, stated that "the destruction of the EDES pocket" is of vital importance.

=== Final months of Axis occupation ===
On 29 February 1944, an agreement was signed in Plaka Bridge in Pindus among the armed groups of the Greek resistance: EAM, EDES and the EKKA. According to this, they agreed to refrain from infringing on each other's territory and that all future efforts would be directed against the Germans rather than each other. This marked the end of the "First Round" of the Greek civil war. A conference in Lebanon on 17–20 May 1944, where representatives from all resistance organizations and the Greek government-in-exile participated, the unification of all resistance groups under a "Government of National Unity", headed by Georgios Papandreou was agreed. EAM-ELAS was granted one-fourth of the cabinet posts in the new government.

ELAS, and to a lesser extent EDES and the other surviving resistance groups, assumed control of the countryside, but all groups refrained from trying to seize control of the Athens-Piraeus area, in accordance with their previous agreements. In the resulting "Caserta Agreement", signed on 26 September 1944, EDES, ELAS, and the Greek government-in-exile, agreed to place their forces under the command of British Lt. General Ronald Scobie, designated to represent the Allied High Command in Greece, for the purpose of driving the Axis out of Greece. ELAS and EDES also agreed to allow the landing of British forces in Greece, to refrain from any attempt to seize power on their own, and to support the return of the Greek Government of National Unity under Georgios Papandreou.

== The Holocaust in Greece ==
Prior to World War II, there existed two main groups of Jews in Greece: the scattered Romaniote communities which had existed in Greece since antiquity; and the approximately 56,000-strong Sephardi Jewish community of Thessaloniki, originally Jews fleeing the Spanish Inquisition who were guaranteed safe shelter by Ottoman Sultan Bayazid II, who ordered all regional governors to welcome Jewish refugees onto their shores, with later Ottoman governments continuing the policies of granting citizenship and shelter to Jews fleeing persecution by Christian rulers.

The Jews of Greece were originally mostly Romaniote Jews who spoke a Greek dialect but with the mass arrival of Sephardim from Spain, many of these became assimilated into the newly dominant Sephardic culture and Ladino language among the Jewish community. Jews had been the majority in Thessaloniki for centuries, and remained so at the end of Ottoman rule on the eve of the Balkan Wars, although this majority was lost as the Jewish community declined from 90,000 down to 56,000 after the collapse of the Ottoman Empire, including anti-Jewish (and anti-Ladino) discrimination, land confiscations, the Great Fire of Thessaloniki and the reconstruction afterwards which displaced the Jewish community. The Jewish communities of Athens, the islands and Epirus were integrated into Greek public life, while the picture was more complicated in the traditionally Ladino-speaking Thessaloniki community. Although the Greek Jewish community was used to Jewish–Christian tensions that often had origins in the economic rivalries, they were completely unprepared for the forms of antisemitism which had matured in Germany.

Despite some assistance from the surrounding Greek population, what was left of the Jewish community in Thessaloniki would be almost entirely annihilated by the Holocaust; only 1,950 individuals survived. Only one Jewish family from Thessaloniki, once called the "mother of Israel", survived intact. In total, at least 81% (around 60,000) of Greece's total pre-war Jewish population perished, with the percentage ranging from 91% in Thessaloniki to 50% in Athens, and less in other provincial areas such as Volos (36%). The low rate in Volos was because of coordination by Rabbi Pesach with the region's bishop, who was tipped off by the German consul in Volos, and the actions of the local Greek community that provided them with resources during their time in hiding. In the Bulgarian zone, death rates surpassed 90%. In Zakynthos, all 275 Jews survived, hidden in the island's interior.

=== German occupation zone ===
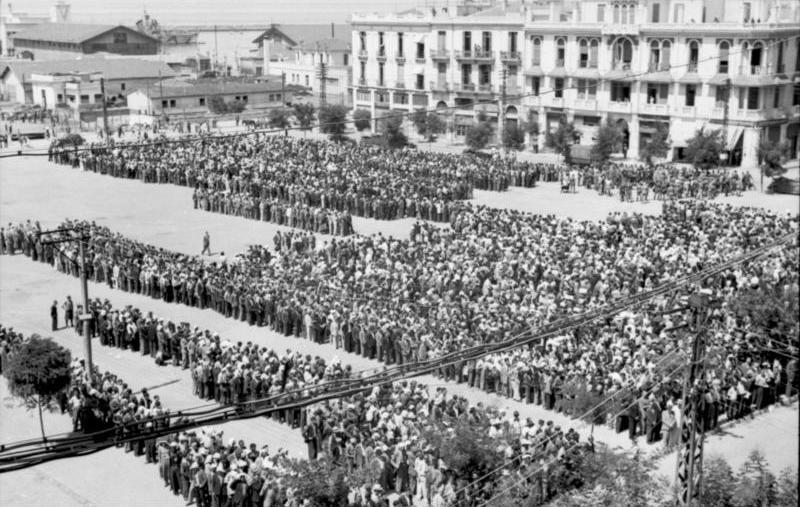
Registration of male Jews at the center of Thessaloniki (Eleftherias square), July 1942

When the occupation zones were drawn up, Thessaloniki came under German control, while Thrace came under Bulgarian control. The Greek army evacuated Thessaloniki in early 1941, and the population was urged to stock up on supplies in preparation for the hard times ahead; before the arrival of Germans, local antisemites began posting warnings on Jewish businesses saying "Jews Not Welcome Here". The German occupation of the city began on 8 April 1941. On 15 April the Jewish leadership within the city was arrested, and in June, the Rosenburg Commando began confiscating Jewish cultural property including manuscripts and art, and sending it back to Germany. Significant hardship occurred in the winter of 1941–1942, as refugees streamed in from the hinterlands of Greek Macedonia and Thrace, straining food supplies beyond their limit and causing starvation and typhus outbreaks, combined with summary executions of the Jewish population during the situation by the Germans; during some parts of the winter, 60 Jews died each day. The Germans made an effort to spread antisemitic sentiments among the local population, and revived local antisemitic publications that had been banned under the Metaxas regime.

For the first year of the German occupation, neither the Nuremberg Laws nor any specific antisemitic measures were applied, although there were some unorganized incidents by local antisemites. However, since 1937 but especially during this year, the Germans undertook a systematic investigation of the Jewish community and its assets, which included having Hans Reegler, a half-Greek half-German agent who pretended to be a British Jew named William Lions, assemble a comprehensive network of informants that compiled all the necessary information on individuals and assets of value.

In July 1942, forced labor was imposed on the Jewish population by Max Merten, the German chief civilian administrator of Thessaloniki. Merten ordered all Jews between the ages of 18 and 45 to report to Eleftherios Square at 8 in the morning. In a "ritual humiliation" in extreme heat, fully clothed, the 9,000 men were forced to take part in a "gymnastics drill" lasting six and a half hours, under the threat of being beaten, whipped, shot or set upon by dogs if they did not do as they were told. They were forced to gaze straight at the sun the whole time, and if their eyes moved, they would be whipped or otherwise punished. The "drill" also included running long distances, moving about on all fours, rolling in dust and performing somersaults. In the following days, several of the men died from brain hemorrhages or meningitis.

In October 1942, Merten implemented measures to extract any and all objects of value (jewelry, etc.) from the Jewish community. Merten, 28 years old at the time, was "above all an extortionist". He allowed exemptions from his forced labor programme for large amounts of money, paid in cash stuffed in sacks brought to his office by wheelbarrow. Salonica's Chief Rabbi, Zevi Koretz was a "naïve partner" of Merten; he acquiesced to all of Merten's demands, thinking that by doing so he was saving his people from extermination; however despite his good faith, he made it easier for the Germans to implement their plans.

In December 1942, Jewish cemeteries were looted. The Germans demolished the old Jewish cemetery in Thessaloniki, which dated back to the 15th century Spanish expulsions of Sephardim so the ancient tombstones could be used as building material for sidewalks and walls. They were also used to build a public baths and a swimming pool in the city. The site of the old cemetery is today occupied by the campus of the Aristotle University of Thessaloniki.

In 1943, Jews in the German zones were forced to wear the Star of David, and their residences were similarly marked, so they could be easily identified and further isolated from the rest of Greek society. Jewish families were kicked out of their homes and arrested while the Nazi-controlled press turned public opinion by spreading antisemitism against them. As spring approached, Jews were shoved into ghettos, the largest of which was called Baron Hirsch, after a Jewish railroad builder in the Habsburg Empire. In this camp, by early March, 2500 Jews were squeezed into 593 small rooms. Signs written in Greek, German and Ladino warned Jews not to exit, and the non-Jewish population to not enter, on pain of death. Throughout the night, German officers forced the Jewish inmates to perform traditional dances for their "entertainment". At the end of their stay, the railroad to Salonica that had been built by the historical Baron Hirsch, originally intended to help Jews escape from Russian pogroms, was used to send Salonica's Jews north to Auschwitz.

Despite warnings of impending deportations, most Jews were reluctant to leave their homes, although several hundred were able to flee the city. The Germans and Bulgarians began mass deportations in March 1943, sending the Jews of Thessaloniki and Thrace in packed boxcars to the distant Auschwitz and Treblinka death camps. By the summer of 1943, the Jews of the German and Bulgarian zones were gone and only those in the Italian zone remained. Jewish property in Thessaloniki was distributed to Greek 'caretakers' who were chosen by special committee, the "Service for the Disposal of Jewish Property" (YDIP). Instead of giving apartments and businesses to the many refugees, they were most often given to friends and relatives of committee members or collaborators.

=== Italian occupation zone ===
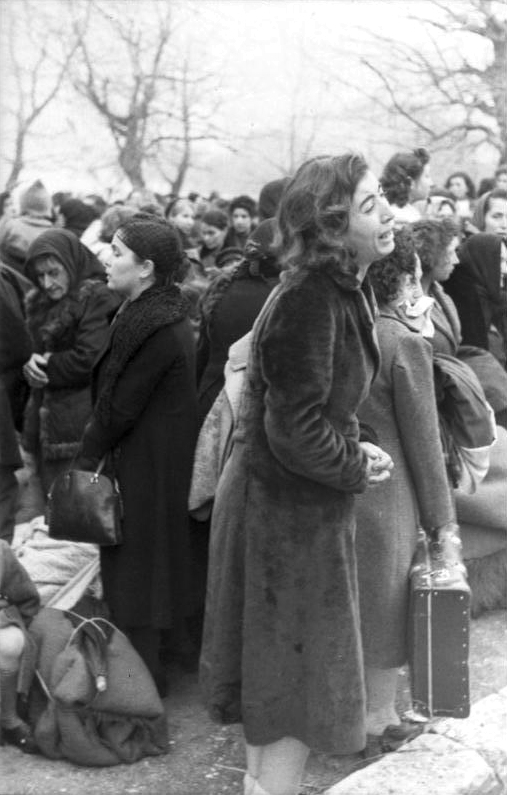
A young woman weeps during the deportation of Romaniote Jews of Ioannina on 25 March 1944. Almost all of the people deported were murdered on or shortly after the train carrying them reached Auschwitz-Birkenau on 11 April 1944.

In September 1943, after the Italian collapse, the Germans turned their attention to the Jews of Athens and the rest of formerly Italian-occupied Greece. There their propaganda was not as effective, as the ancient Romaniote Jewish communities were well-integrated into the Orthodox Greek society and could not easily be singled out from the Christians, who in turn were more ready to resist the German authorities' demands. The Archbishop of Athens Damaskinos ordered his priests to ask their congregations to help the Jews and sent a strong-worded letter of protest to the collaborationist authorities and the Germans. Many Orthodox Christians risked their lives hiding Jews in their apartments and homes, despite the threat of imprisonment. Even the Greek police ignored instructions to turn over Jews to the Germans. When Jewish community leaders appealed to Prime Minister Ioannis Rallis, he stated that Jews in Thessaloniki had been guilty of subversive activities so this was the reason for the deportations from Ioannina.

At the same time, Elias Barzilai, the Grand Rabbi of Athens, was summoned to the Department of Jewish Affairs and told to submit a list of names and addresses of members of the Jewish community. Instead, he destroyed the community records, thus saving the lives of thousands of Athenian Jews. He advised the Jews of Athens to flee or go into hiding. A few days later, the Rabbi himself was spirited out of the city by EAM-ELAS fighters and joined the resistance. EAM-ELAS helped hundreds of Jews escape and survive (especially officer Stefanos Sarafis), many of whom stayed with the resistance as fighters and/or interpreters.

=== Bulgarian occupation zone ===
In March 1943 the vast majority of the Jewish population, 4,058 of the 4,273 was rounded up and sent to local warehouses by the Bulgarian occupation authorities. They were initially sent by train to concentration camps in Bulgaria. Kept under inhumane conditions, they were informed by the Bulgarians that they would be sent to Mandatory Palestine. However, the deportees could not be convinced. Except for five who died in the Bulgarian camps they were sent to Treblinka extermination camp, where they died in the following days. By the end of March 97% of the local Jewish community had been exterminated.

== Liberation and aftermath ==
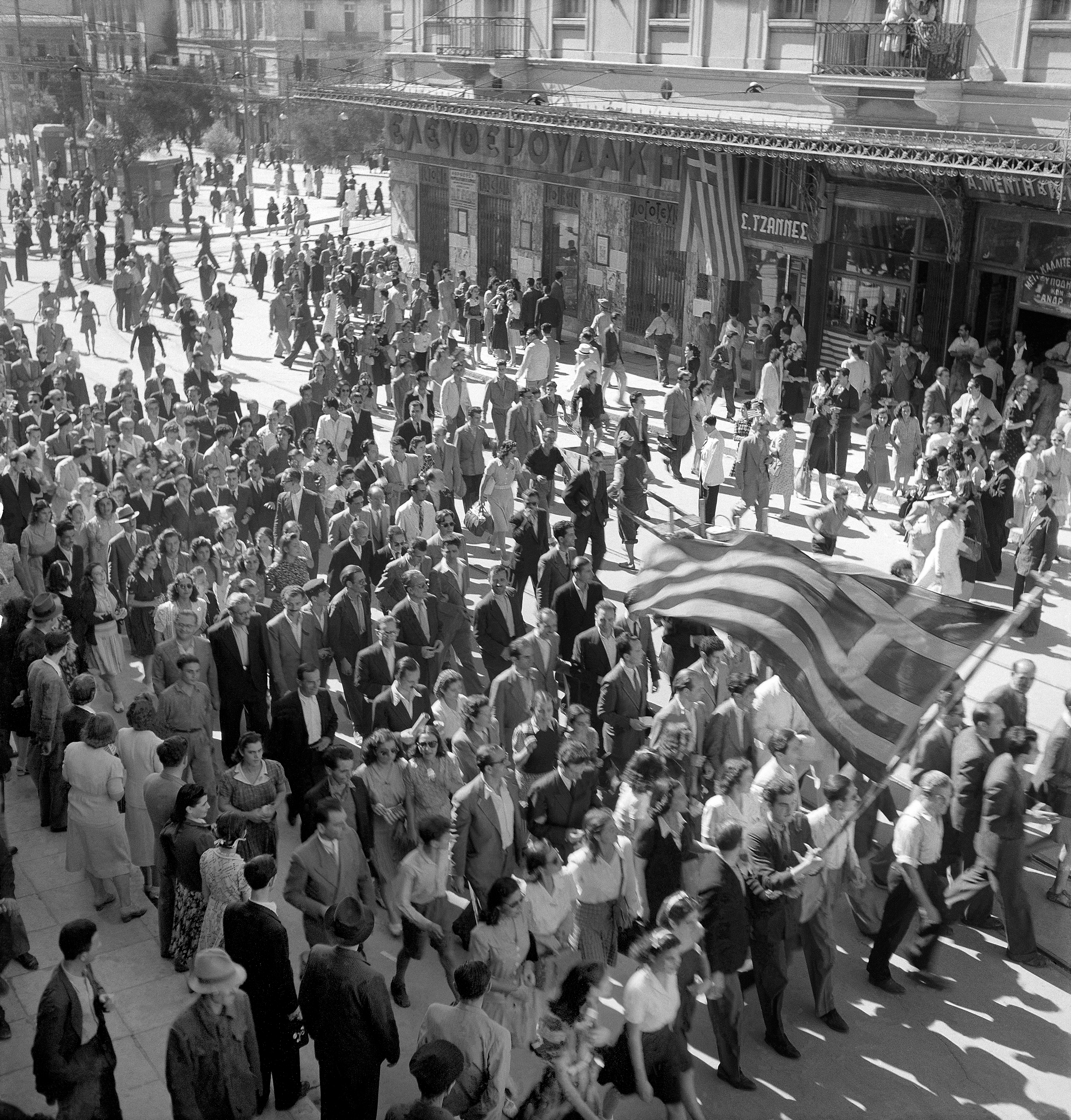
Residents of Athens celebrating the liberation from the Axis powers, October 1944

On 20 August 1944, the Red Army invaded Romania. The Romanian Army collapsed, the German 6th Army was encircled and destroyed while the German 8th Army retreated into the Carpathians. Accelerating the collapse was the coup in Bucharest on 23 August 1944 as King Michael dismissed Marshal Ion Antonescu as Prime Minister and declared war on Germany. Within a matter of days, most of Romania was occupied by the Soviet Union including most importantly, the Ploiești oil fields, which were Germany's most important source of oil. Germany had occupied Greece in 1941 out of the fear that British bombers based in Greece would bomb the Romanian oil fields and deprive the Reich of the oil that powered its war machine. On 23 August 1944, at a meeting at his headquarters, Adolf Hitler told Field Marshal Maximilian von Weichs, the commander of the German forces in the Balkans, that with the Romanian oil fields lost and the Greek resistance inflicting serious casualties, there was now no more point in occupying Greece and he should begin preparations for a withdrawal from Greece at once.

German troops evacuated Athens on 12 October 1944, and by the end of the month, they had withdrawn from mainland Greece. The first British troops under General Scobie arrived in Athens on 14 October 1944. Four days later, the Greek government-in-exile returned to the Greek capital. Conflict between the monarchist Right and the republican and communist Left soon erupted, despite the initiatives of Prime Minister Georgios Papandreou. On 1 December, the government decreed that all guerrilla groups were to be disarmed. On 2 December, the six EAM ministers in the Government of National Unity resigned in protest, and on 4 December Papandreou himself resigned too. A new government was formed by Themistoklis Sofoulis. The immediate cause of the fighting was an unsanctioned EAM demonstration in Athens' Syntagma Square on Sunday, 3 December 1944, which turned violent when gunfire erupted. Meanwhile, General Scobie promptly ordered all ELAS units to leave Athens within seventy-two hours, and on the following day he declared martial law. The clashes ended on the night of 5 January, and ELAS began a general withdrawal from the Greek capital. BBC News estimates Greece suffered at least 250,000 dead during the Axis occupation. Historian William Woodruff lists 155,300 dead Greek civilians and 16,400 military deaths, while David T. Zabecki lists 73,700 battle deaths and 350,000 civilian deaths.

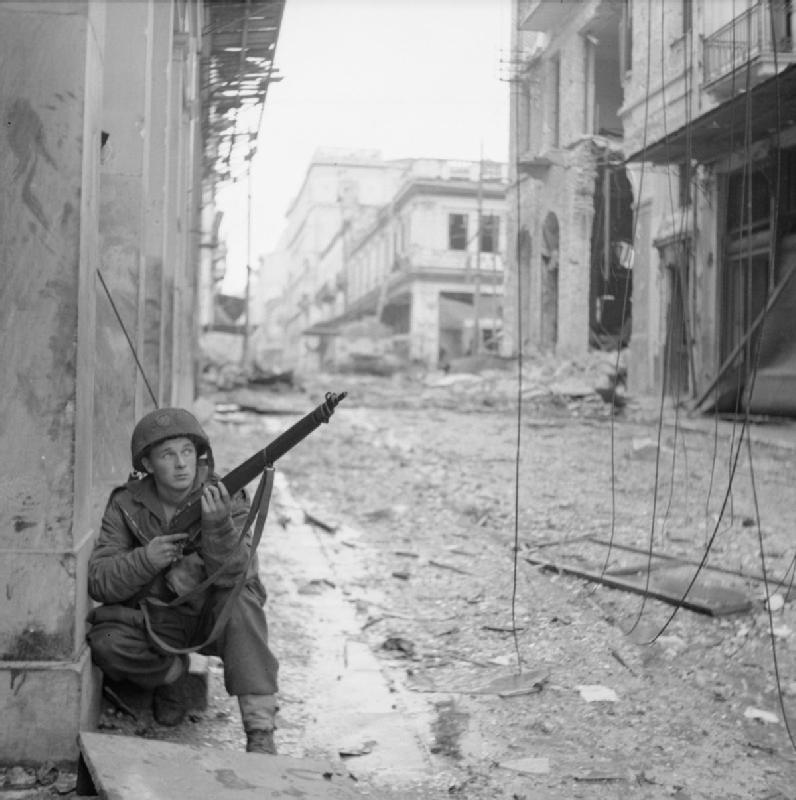
A soldier from the 5th (Scottish) Parachute Battalion takes cover in Athens during the Dekemvriana events, 18 December 1944

Negotiations between the newly established Greek government and EAM concluded at 12 February 1945, with the Treaty of Varkiza. This provided a temporary respite from open warfare but Greece was in ruins. The country remained politically divided and unstable. Several anti-left elements, friendly to the former Security Battalions, had been appointed to key posts in the Ministry of War, while thoughts of allowing former andartes to enter the new National Guard were abandoned. This policy made an impartial solution to Greece's security problems virtually impossible, and undermined the moral basis for the British doctrine of non-interference in internal Greek affairs. British Foreign Office was also fearful of Soviet influence in Greece. Such developments infuriated a part of the EAM members. One of them was Aris Velouchiotis who was also denounced by the Communist Party and decided to continue his guerrilla activity. After a few months, he was hunted down by government units and executed. Official policy towards Axis collaborators was milder and more hesitant than perhaps anywhere else in Europe. Alexandros Lambou, a Pangalos follower and head of the special security police during the war period, was sentenced to death, but most of his co-defendants received short prison terms. During 1945, more than 80,000 people were prosecuted. The judges, many of whom had served during the occupation period, sentenced leftists harshly, and wartime collaborators lightly. US and UK intelligence opposed the appointment of Zervas as a minister citing their suspicions of his collaboration with Nazi Germany.

Greece's recovery from the devastation of World War II and the Axis occupation lagged far behind that of the rest of Europe. About 8% of the Greek population of c. 7 million had died during the conflicts and the occupation. Sanitation conditions were deplorable, and the health of those who had survived was imperilled by a resurgence of malaria and tuberculosis, the lack of medicines and medical materials, inadequate diet, and the breakdown of preventive measures. One-fourth of the villages had been burned, and over 100,000 buildings destroyed or heavily damaged. Nearly 700,000 of the total Greek population were refugees and lacked the basic necessities of life. Famine was narrowly averted in 1945 only by massive aid provided by the Allies and the United Nations Relief and Rehabilitation Administration (UNRRA). In the second half of 1945 UNRRA delivered to Greece some $171 million (equivalent to $3058 million in 2025) in goods. In the first year after the liberation, over 1.7 million tons of food were provided by UNRRA and the Allies. Nevertheless, a minimum daily ration of 2,000 calories proved impossible.

== Influence in post-war culture ==
The Axis occupation of Greece, specifically the Greek islands, has a significant presence in English-language books and films. Real special forces raids, e.g., Ill Met by Moonlight or fictional special forces raids The Guns of Navarone, Escape to Athena and They Who Dare (1954), and the fictional occupation narrative Captain Corelli's Mandolin are examples. Notable Greek movies referring to the period, the war and the occupation are The Germans Strike Again, What did you do in the war, Thanasi? and Ipolochagos Natassa. The Italian film Mediterraneo, which won the 1991 Academy Award for Best Foreign Language Film, tells the story of an idyllic Greek island where the residents absorb the eight Italian occupiers into their daily lives.

== Notable personalities ==
Greek collaborators

- Lt General Georgios Tsolakoglou, Prime Minister 1941–42
- Konstantinos Logothetopoulos, Prime Minister 1942–43
- Ioannis Rallis, Prime Minister 1943–44
- Sotirios Gotzamanis, Finance Minister 1941–43
- Major General Georgios Bakos, Army Minister 1941–43
- Colonel Ioannis Plytzanopoulos, head of the Security Battalions
- Colonel Georgios Poulos, SS collaborator
- George Seremetis, mayor of Thessaloniki
- Ioannis Voulpiotis, representative of Siemens in Greece

Greek Resistance leaders

- Aris Velouchiotis, chief ELAS captain
- Napoleon Zervas, military leader of EDES
- Dimitrios Psarros, military leader of EKKA
- General Stefanos Sarafis, military commander of ELAS
- Georgios Siantos, political leader of EAM
- Markos Vafiades, senior ELAS captain in Macedonia
- Evripidis Bakirtzis, head of the PEEA
- Komninos Pyromaglou, political leader of EDES
- Georgios Kartalis, political leader of EKKA
- Vasilios Sachinis, leader of Northern Epirus Liberation Front (MAVI)
- Georgios Petrakis (Petrakogiorgis), partisan leader in Crete

Other Greek personalities

- Angelos Evert, Athens City Police Chief
- Damaskinos, Archbishop of Athens
- Manolis Glezos and Apostolos Santas
- Elias Degiannis
- George Psychoundakis, Cretan partisan

German officials

- Ambassador Günther Altenburg, German Plenipotentiary
- Hermann Neubacher, Reich Special Envoy, 1942–44
- Jürgen Stroop, HSSPF August–October 1943
- Walter Schimana, HSSPF October 1943-October 1944
- Captain Anton Burger, SD February–September 1944
- Colonel Walter Blume, SD Commandant, October 1943-September 1944
- General Alexander Löhr, Commander, Army Group E, C-in-C South-East
- General Hubert Lanz, Commander, XXII Mountain Army Corps
- General Hellmuth Felmy, Military Commander, Southern Greece
- General Walter Stettner, Commander, 1st Mountain Division
- General Karl von Le Suire, Commander, 117th Jäger Division
- General Hartwig von Ludwiger, Commander, 104th Jäger Division
- General Friedrich-Wilhelm Müller, Commander, "Fortress Crete"
- General Heinrich Kreipe, Commander, 22nd Air Landing Infantry Division
- Dr. Max Merten, Chief of Military Administration, Salonika
- Dieter Wisliceny, responsible for the deportation of Salonika's Jews
- Friedrich Schubert, Wehrmacht paramilitary Sonderführer in Crete and Macedonia

Italian officials

- Ambassador Pellegrino Ghigi, Italian Plenipotentiary 1941–43
- General Carlo Geloso, Commander, Italian 11th Army
  and Supreme Commander of mainland Greece (Supergrecia)
- Admiral Inigo Campioni, Governor of the Dodecanese
  and Supreme Commander of the Aegean (Superegeo)

Leaders of secessionist movements:

- Andon Kalchev, leader of the pro-Bulgarian Ohrana
- Alcibiades Diamandi, leader of the Aromanian "Roman Legion" (an organization of Aromanians who supported the Italian army) and promoter of the idea for an Aromanian-run, independent canton
- Nicolaos Matussis, close associate of Diamandi

British agents

- Brigadier Eddie Myers, SOE
- Colonel Christopher Woodhouse, SOE
- Patrick Leigh Fermor, SOE
- N. G. L. Hammond, SOE
- W. Stanley Moss, SOE

== See also ==
- German reparations for World War II
- Hyperinflation in Greece

== Bibliography ==
- Brownfeld, Peter E. (2003). "The Italian Holocaust: The Story of an Assimilated Jewish Community". American Council for Judaism.
- Dorril, Stephen (2002). MI6: Inside the Covert World of Her Majesty's Secret Intelligence Service. Simon and Schuster. ISBN 978-0743217781.
- Fischer, Bernd Jürgen (1999). Albania at War, 1939–1945. C. Hurst & Co. Publishers. ISBN 978-1850655312.
- Fleischer, Hagen (2020). Krieg und Nachkrieg: Das schwierige deutsch-griechische Jahrhundert [War and Post-War: The Difficult German–Greek Century] (in German). Cologne: Vandenhoeck & Ruprecht. ISBN 978-341251790-8.
- Fonzi, Paolo (2019). Fame di guerra. L'occupazione italiana della Grecia (1941–1943) [War Hunger. The Italian Occupation of Greece 1941–1943] (in Italian). Carocci. ISBN 978-8843099481.
- Hatziiosif, Christos; Papastratis, Prokopis, eds. (2007). Ιστορία της Ελλάδας του 20ού αιώνα, Γ' Τόμος: Β' Παγκόσμιος Πόλεμος. Κατοχή – Αντίσταση 1940–1945, Μέρος 1ο [History of Greece in the 20th Century, Volume III: World War II. Occupation and Resistance 1940–1945, Part 1]. Athens: Bibliorama. ISBN 978-9608087057.
- Hatziiosif, Christos; Papastratis, Prokopis, eds. (2007). Ιστορία της Ελλάδας του 20ού αιώνα, Γ' Τόμος: Β' Παγκόσμιος Πόλεμος. Κατοχή – Αντίσταση 1940–1945, Μέρος 2ο [History of Greece in the 20th Century, Volume III: World War II. Occupation and Resistance 1940–1945, Part 2]. Athens: Bibliorama. ISBN 978-9608087064.
- Karras, Georgios (1985). "The Revolution that Failed: The story of the Greek Communist Party in the period 1941–49". Dept. Of Political Studies. University of Manitoba, Canada: unpublished M.A. Thesis.
- Knopp, Guido (2009). Die Wehrmacht – Eine Bilanz (in German). Goldmann. ISBN 978-3442155613.
- Iatrides, John; Wrigley, Linda (1995). Greece at the crossroads: the Civil War and its legacy. Penn State Press. ISBN 0271014113.
- Iatrides, John O. (2015). Revolt in Athens: The Greek Communist "Second Round," 1944–1945. Princeton University Press. ISBN 978-1400869572.
- Mazower, Mark (1993). Inside Hitler's Greece: The Experience of Occupation, 1941–44. New Haven and London: Yale University Press. ISBN 0-300-06552-3.
- Mazower, Mark (2000). After the War was Over: Reconstructing the Family, Nation, and State in Greece, 1943–1960. Princeton University Press. ISBN 978-0691058429.
- Mazower, Mark (2004). Salonica, City of Ghosts. Harper Collins. ISBN 0007120222.
- Meyer, Hermann Frank (2008). Blutiges Edelweiß: Die 1. Gebirgs-division im zweiten Weltkrieg [Bloodstained Edelweiss. The 1st Mountain-Division in WWII] (in German). Ch. Links Verlag. ISBN 978-3861534471.
- Miller, Marshall Lee (1975). Bulgaria during the Second World War. Stanford University Press. ISBN 978-0804708708.
- Munoz, Antonio J. (2018). The German Secret Field Police in Greece, 1941–44. MacFarland & Company, Inc. ISBN 978-1476667843.
- German Antiguerrilla Operations in The Balkans (1941–1944). Washington DC: Center of Military History. 1953.
- Helger, Bengt (1949). Ravitaillement de la Grèce, pendant l'occupation 1941–44 et pendant les premiers cinq mois après la liberation. Rapport final de la Commission de Gestion pour les Secours en Grèce sous les auspices du Comité International de la Croix-Rouge (in French). Société Hellenique d'Editions.
- Santarelli, Lidia (2004). "Muted violence: Italian war crimes in occupied Greece". Journal of Modern Italian Studies. 9 (3): 280–299. doi:10.1080/1354571042000254728. S2CID 143570472.
- Shrader, Charles R. (1999). The withered vine: logistics and the communist insurgency in Greece, 1945–1949. Greenwood Publishing Group. p. 38. ISBN 978-0275965440.
- Weinberg, Gerhard (2005). A World at Arms A Global History of World War Two. Cambridge University Press. ISBN 978-0521618267.
- Voglis, Polymeris (2006). "Surviving Hunger: Life in the Cities and the Countryside during the Occupation". In Gildea, Robert; Wievorka, Olivier; Warring, Anette (eds.). Surviving Hitler and Mussolini: Daily Life in Occupied Europe. Oxford: Berg. pp. 16–41. ISBN 978-1845201814.
- Wievorka, Olivier; Tebinka, Jacek (2006). "Resisters: From Everyday Life to Counter-state". In Gildea, Robert; Wievorka, Olivier; Warring, Anette (eds.). Surviving Hitler and Mussolini: Daily Life in Occupied Europe. Oxford: Berg. pp. 153–176. ISBN 978-1845201814.
- Woodruff, William (1998). A Concise History of the Modern World: 1500 to the Present. Palgrave Macmillan. ISBN 9781349266630. OCLC 49285700.
- Zabecki, David T. (2015). World War II in Europe: An Encyclopedia: Military History of the United States. Routledge. ISBN 9781135812423. OCLC 908389541.
