= Günther Altenburg =

German diplomat (1894–1984)

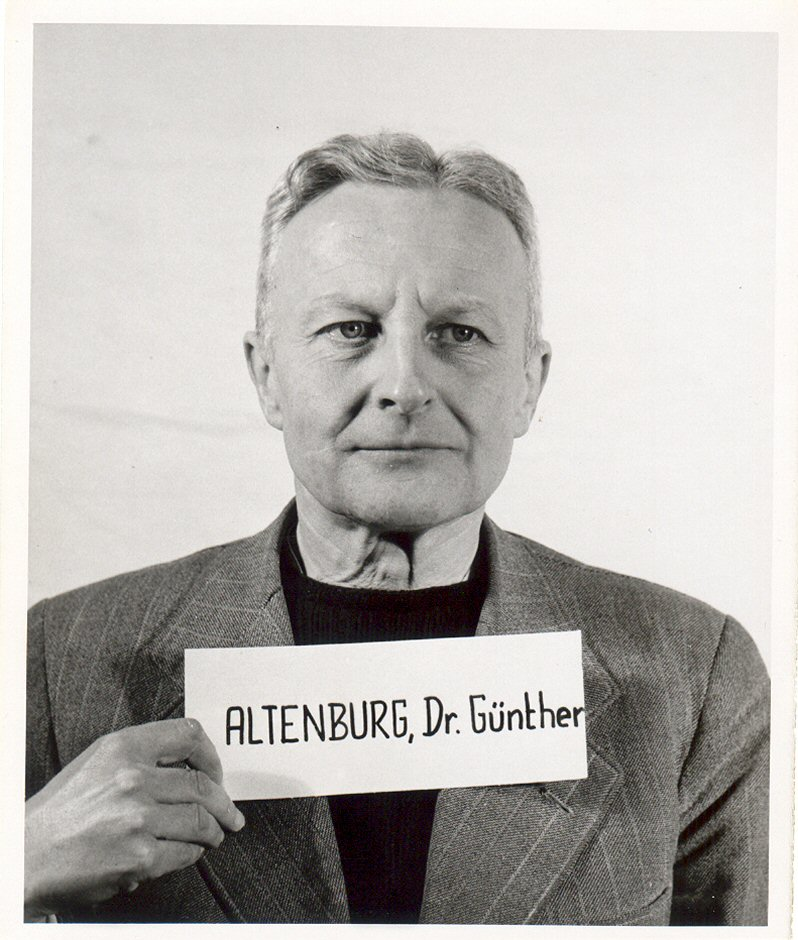
- Altenburg after being arrested for war crimes in 1945

Reich plenipotentiary for Greece (De facto co-head of state)
- In office April 28, 1941 – November 3, 1943 Serving with Pellegrino Ghigi (Italian plenipotentiary)
- Appointed by: Adolf Hitler
- Prime Minister: Georgios Tsolakoglou (1941–1942); Konstantinos Logothetopoulos (1942–1943); Ioannis Rallis (1943)
- Preceded by: Office Established
- Succeeded by: Hermann Neubacher

Reich plenipotentiary for Serbia
- In office April, 1941 – April 28, 1941
- Preceded by: Position established
- Succeeded by: Position abolished Helmuth Förster (as military commander)

Personal details
- Born: 5 June 1894 Königsberg, East Prussia, German Empire
- Died: 23 October 1984 (aged 90) Bonn, North Rhine-Westphalia, West Germany
- Party: NSDAP

Günther Altenburg (5 June 1894 – 23 October 1984) was a Nazi German diplomat and civil official.

His first diplomatic assignments took him to postings at Rome, Vienna and Bucharest, and he remained involved with southeastern Europe throughout his career. In 1934, he was serving in Vienna during the failed July Putsch, and was likely involved in its preparation. Thereafter he was recalled to Berlin, where he worked in the section dealing with Austria and Czechoslovakia.

Dr Altenburg joined the Nazi Party in 1935, and was given a position in the secretariat of Foreign Minister Joachim von Ribbentrop. After the invasion of Yugoslavia in April 1941, he was initially slated to become plenipotentiary for Serbia, but on 28 April 1941 he was named Reich plenipotentiary for Greece. As the highest-ranking German civil official in occupied Greece, Altenburg functioned as the overseer of the Greek puppet government along with his Italian counterpart Pellegrino Ghigi, and was directly involved in the deportation of the Jewish population of Thessaloniki in spring 1943. He was removed from his post on 3 November 1943, after the Italian capitulation and the complete occupation of Greece by the Germans, which led to a complete restructuring of the German administration under the new Military Governor of Greece, Alexander Löhr.

After the war, he testified at the Nuremberg trials, and served as the secretary general of the Deutsche Gruppe der Internationalen Handelskammer ("German Group of the International Chamber of Commerce") industrial lobby.
