= Compulsory loan of Greece to Nazi Germany =

Compulsory loan imposed by Nazi Germany on Greece during World War II

The Compulsory loan of Greece to Nazi Germany (German: Deutsche Zwangsanleihe in Griechenland), also known as the forced loan of 1942 (Greek: καταναγκαστικό δάνειο του 1942) or Occupation loan (κατοχικό δάνειο) refers to a payment for occupation costs demanded by Nazi Germany from the collaborationist Greek government during the German occupation in the Second World War.

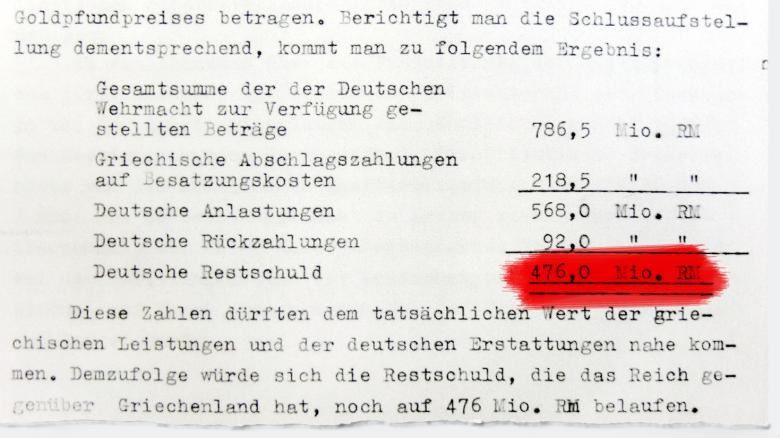
Excerpt from file R 27320 from 1945, page 114 in the Political Archive of the Foreign Office: "German Remaining Debt" totaling 476 million RM.

From April 1943, Germany began repaying part of its debt in monthly installments. Converted into Reichsmark and taking into account exchange rate fluctuations, a German document compiled in 1945 listed a "German Remaining Debt" of 476 million RM.

The question of a Greek repayment claim now valued between 5 and 11 billion Euro has been a contentious issue between Greece and Germany in the 21st century, recently intertwined with the debate over the Greek debt crisis. The dispute is pursued more through public media than legal or diplomatic channels.

The occupation regime by the Axis powers (Bulgaria, Italy, and Germany) was marked by economic exploitation. Greece not only had to bear the occupation costs; the occupying powers also extensively extracted raw materials and products from Greece, leading to what is known as the Great Famine.

As the transportation of valuables from Greece continuously increased in value and volume, with little reciprocal supplies from the German side, Greece's accounts, which formally managed the payments for these goods, showed a credit balance. In December 1942, the Greek collaborationist government was forced to agree to treat this credit balance as an interest-free claim, to be repaid after the war.

According to a final report by the Foreign Office of the German Reich to the Reichsbank dated April 12, 1945, this outstanding debt amounted to 476 million Reichsmark.

== Historical and Legal Assessments ==
=== Greece ===
Greek politicians and victims' associations have consistently highlighted the reparations issue, also claiming compensation for the compulsory loan of 1942. From the Greek perspective, it is legally unresolved whether repayment falls under reparations or should be regarded as a civilian credit.

Recent examples include a commission set up by the conservative Antonis Samaras government to assess the likelihood of successful claims. His successor, the leftist Alexis Tsipras, reiterated "moral responsibility to our people, to history, and to all the peoples of Europe" to claim the funds. It seems unlikely that Greece could gain European partners in this matter, as a potential fallout with Germany appears unattractive. Consequently, Greek authorities have not pursued any initiatives in this direction.

=== Germany ===
Götz Aly in a column for the Berliner Zeitung on February 23, 2015, called the "compulsory loan" a "legend" that has been nurtured by the historian Hagen Fleischer for years. This was followed on March 18, 2015, by the author Sven Felix Kellerhoff in the newspaper Die Welt. He references a 1945 file that is currently archived and publicly accessible at the Political Archive of the Foreign Office (PA AA) under the file number "R 27320". According to this file, the occupation costs were to be settled, the estimated balance at the end of the occupation of Greece amounted to 476 million RM, which, according to the file, still had to be reduced by German services.

The Hague Conventions do not explicitly address the permissibility of forced loans from the population of an occupied territory for the benefit of the occupier. However, the exercise of military power in occupied enemy territory includes aspects of the permissibility of interventions in public property. A definitive international legal assessment of the German procedure could only be made in the context of a judicial or arbitration proceeding, which has not been pending nor was previously held.

The Federal Government of Germany considers the demand for repayment of the loan to be a Greek demand for reparations and has not recognized such claims since 1990. It argues particularly that arrangements have been made regarding restitution, from which Greece has also benefited. After decades of "peaceful, trustworthy, and fruitful cooperation" between Germany and its NATO and EU partner Greece, the "reparations issue has lost its justification," according to the government. Therefore, the Federal Republic sees no reason to fulfill the demand.

The view of the Federal Government is not uncontroversial; it is referred to by the Left Party in the Bundestab with reference to an expert opinion of the Scientific Services of the Bundestag (WD 2, 041/13) as "not compelling."

German politicians like Volker Kauder, Gerda Hasselfeldt, or Wolfgang Schäuble rejected the claims of the Greek government for reparations as legally unjustified in March 2015. The Foreign Office, e.g., State Minister Michael Roth (SPD), also rejects reparations demands by the Greek government. The issue of reparations is legally and politically concluded, declared german federal president Frank-Walter Steinmeier.

== Revisitation of the Claim in 2015 ==
The current value of the repayment claim is assessed very differently by experts: The calculations range between three billion and 64 billion euros. According to a confidential report by a commission of experts of the Greek Court of Audit, which was presented to the government in January 2015, the Greek experts come up with a figure of eleven billion euros. Other experts estimate Germany's total debts to Greece to be now up to 160 billion or even up to 575 billion euros.

A Greek study on monetary claims from Greece to Germany was completed in early March 2013 and declared strictly confidential. On March 8, 2015, the newspaper To Vima published this study. The total claims are estimated between 269 and 332 billion euros. Prime Minister Tsipras said two days after the publication that a parliamentary committee should deal with the issue.

In April 2015, Greek Deputy Finance Minister Dimitris Mardas stated a current value of the compulsory loan at 10.3 billion euros.
