= Pellegrino Ghigi =

Italian diplomat

- Born: 29 November 1899
- Died: 1995 (aged 95–96)
- Occupation: Diplomat

Pellegrino Ghigi (29 November 1899 – 1995) was an Italian diplomat.

== Career ==
Ghigi was ambassador of Italy to Egypt (1935 – June 1936), Romania (1938–1941) and Spain (25 July 1958 – 5 May 1961). He was also Italian plenipotentiary in occupied Greece (1941–1943).

== Honors ==
Order of Merit of the Italian Republic 1st Class / Knight Grand Cross – 2 June 1955

== See also ==
- Ministry of Foreign Affairs (Italy)
- Foreign relations of Italy

== Bibliography ==
- Friedrich Christof: Befriedung im Donauraum. Der Zweite Wiener Schiedsspruch und die deutsch-ungarischen diplomatischen Beziehungen 1939–1942. Frankfurt am Main : Lang, 1998

Preceded by Emilio Pagliano	Ambassador of Italy to Egypt; 1935–1936	Succeeded by Serafino Mazzolini
Preceded by Antonio Paternò Castello di San Giuliano	Ambassador of Italy to Romania; 1938–1941	Succeeded by Giacomo de Martino
Preceded by Giulio del Balzo di Presenzano	Ambassador of Italy to Spain; 1958–1961	Succeeded by Cristoforo Fracassi Ratti Mentone di Torre Rossano
