= Hermann Neubacher =

Austrian Nazi politician

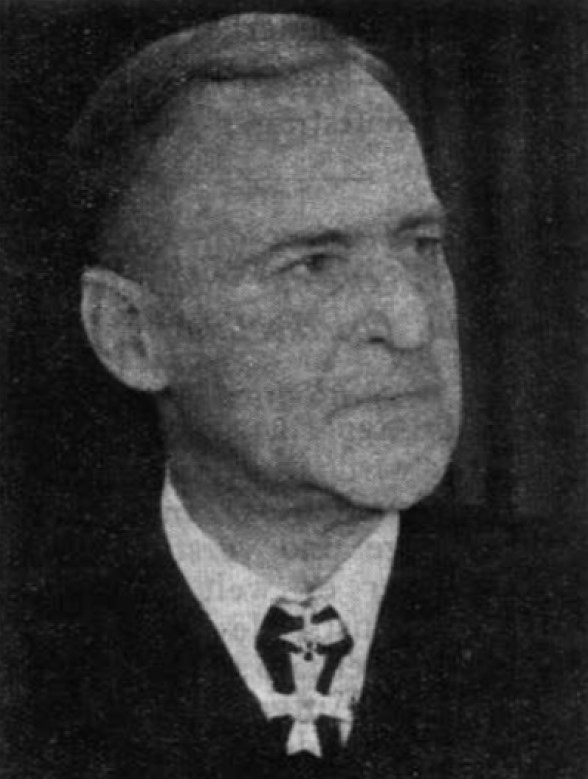
- Neubacher in 1943

Reich plenipotentiary for Greece
- In office November 3, 1943 – October 12, 1944
- Appointed by: Adolf Hitler
- Prime Minister: Ioannis Rallis
- Preceded by: Günther Altenburg
- Succeeded by: Position abolished

Personal details
- Born: June 24, 1893 Wels, Upper Austria, Austria-Hungary
- Died: July 1, 1960 (aged 67) Vienna, Austria
- Party: NSDAP

Hermann Neubacher (24 June 1893 – 1 July 1960) was an Austrian Nazi politician who held a number of diplomatic posts in the Third Reich. During the Second World War, he was appointed as the leading German foreign ministry official for Greece and the Balkans (including Serbia, Albania, and Montenegro).

== Austrian activism ==
Born in Wels, he was educated in Kremsmünster and Vienna before his service on the Italian Front in World War I. Initially connected to the Social Democratic Party of Austria through his friendship with a number of leading members when he was in charge of a housing project in Vienna, Neubacher became attracted to Pan-Germanism and in 1925 founded his own Österreichisch-Deutscher Volksbund as a society for the school of thought. He was also a member of the Deutsche Gemeinschaft secret society and in this group he built up friendships with the fellow members Engelbert Dollfuß and Arthur Seyss-Inquart.

Neubacher became a member of the Nazi Party in Austria, which he felt was the best way to bring about Anschluss although he was more in tune with Anton Reinthaller's moderate faction than with the extremists under Theodor Habicht. After a spell as assistant to Josef Leopold, he became Landesleiter of the Austrian Nazi Party in 1935 and attempted to restructure the banned group. His tenure came to an end the same year when he was imprisoned in June for distributing illegal material. Upon his release under the Juliabkommen, Neubacher dropped out of politics to take up a role with IG Farben.

Under the Nazis, Neubacher was chosen to serve as Mayor of Vienna but soon incurred disfavor for his habit of working with former Social Democrats and his lax attitude towards the Jews. Before long, he was downgraded to the role of general representative of Josef Bürckel.

== Greece ==
When war broke out, Neubacher took on the role of a special plenipotentiary envoy in the Balkans and Greece and initially served as an economic adviser in Romania before taking on the role of ambassador to the same country and afterwards Greece as well. In Greece, he was joined by the Italian Alberto D'Agostino, with the two men given full authority over economic and financial matters after discussions between the Greek government and the occupiers aimed at reducing occupation costs.

From October 1942, Neubacher was given the task of containing inflation, which had skyrocketed after the exile of the prewar government and of the Bank of Greece in April 1941. Neubacher immediately suspended payments to Wehrmacht and Greek government contractors, forced contractors to sell gold for drachmas, and banned export of foodstuffs. The techniques worked well for a while, as prices fell during the winter of 1942–1943, but continued seignorage ultimately caused inflation to resume and accelerate from spring 1943 onwards.

Neubacher was the general manager of DEGRIGES, a German monopoly company for trade in Greece.

During the final days of the occupation of Greece, the more moderate Neubacher became embroiled in a struggle with Sicherheitspolizei chief Walter Blume, who had suggested that the Nazis should undertake a policy of executing all members of the political elite that were suspected of having links to the United Kingdom to leave the country leaderless (the so-called "Chaos Thesis"). Neubacher rejected that as counterproductive and argued that as long as politicians opposed the work of the Communist-controlled National Liberation Front and the Greek People's Liberation Army, their British ties would not help them in establishing control. In the end, Neubacher's line was approved, and Blume was withdrawn, a move that ultimately left in place a strong anti-Communist right wing governing class in post-liberation Greece.

== Yugoslavia ==
In 1943, Neubacher devised the Neubacher Plan as a means to improve German occupation in the Balkans. In a wide-ranging raft of reforms, he suggested five main ideas to Joachim von Ribbentrop. These were:

1. The re-unification of Montenegro and Serbia in a federal type of state
2. Installing General Milan Nedić as President of the resulting Greater Serbia
3. Autonomy in Montenegro
4. The re-opening of the University of Belgrade and an end to German supervision of cultural life
5. Reduction in German military presence and the establishment of a gendarmerie controlled by the new government

Ultimately only point 4 of his proposals was approved, although he did succeed in ending German military reprisals and in combating to an extent the Ustaše genocide against Serbs.

== Later life ==
After the war Neubacher faced trial in the Socialist Federal Republic of Yugoslavia and in 1946 a military court in Belgrade sentenced him to 20 years of hard labor, although he was not ultimately required to serve the full sentence. He served his prison term in Belgrade, in the building of the former Gestapo headquarters. He was released from prison in November 1952 due to poor health. Back in Austria, he worked as a building constructor in Salzburg, and from 1954–1956, he worked in Ethiopia as a consultant to Emperor Haile Selassie. He died in Vienna, aged 67.

Political offices
Preceded by Richard Schmitz	Mayor of Vienna; 1938–1940	Succeeded by Philipp Wilhelm Jung
