= Wartime collaboration =

Cooperation with the enemy against one's country of citizenship in wartime

Wartime collaboration is the voluntary cooperation of local populations, officials or combatants with the enemy against their own state, often for personal gain, ideology or survival. It is widely considered as a form of betrayal and a crime (treason) as it is viewed as a breach of loyalty that compromises the safety of the citizens and sovereignty of the state. As historian Gerhard Hirschfeld says, it "is as old as war and the occupation of foreign territory".

The term collaborator dates to the 19th century and was used in France during the Napoleonic Wars. The meaning shifted during World War II to designate traitorous collaboration with the enemy. The related term collaborationism is used by historians who restrict the term to a subset of ideological collaborators in Vichy France who actively promoted German victory.

== Etymology ==
The term collaborate dates from 1871, and is a back-formation from collaborator (1802), from the French collaborateur. It was used during the Napoleonic Wars against smugglers trading with England and assisting in the escape of monarchists. It is derived from the Latin collaboratus, past participle of collaborare "work with", from com- "with" + labore "to work".

The meaning of "traitorous cooperation with the enemy" dates from 1940, originally in reference to the Vichy Government of France, which cooperated with the Germans after the fall of France and during their occupation, 1940–44. It was first used in the modern sense on 24 October 1940 in a meeting between Marshal Philippe Pétain and Adolf Hitler in Montoire-sur-le-Loir a few months after the Fall of France. Pétain believed that Germany had won the war, and informed the French people that he accepted "collaboration" with Germany.

== Definitions ==
Collaboration in wartime can take many forms, including political, economic, social, sexual, cultural, or military collaboration. The activities undertaken can be treasonous, to varying extent, and in a World War II context generally means working with the enemy actively.

Stanley Hoffmann subdivided collaboration into involuntary (reluctant recognition of necessity) and voluntary (an attempt to exploit necessity). According to him, collaboration can be either servile or ideological. Servile is service to an enemy based on necessity for personal survival or comfort, whereas ideological is advocacy for cooperation with an enemy power. In contrast, Bertram Gordon used the terms "collaborator" and "collaborationist" for ideological and non-ideological collaboration, respectively, in France. James Mace Ward has asserted that, while collaboration is often equated with treason, there was "legitimate collaboration" between civilian internees (mostly Americans) in the Philippines and their Japanese captors for mutual benefit and to enhance the possibilities of the internees to survive. Collaboration with the Axis Powers in Europe and Asia existed in varying degrees in all the occupied countries.

Collaboration with the enemy in wartime goes back to prehistory, and has always been present. Since World War II, historians have used it to refer to the wartime occupation of France by Germany in World War II. Unlike other defeated countries which capitulated to Germany, whose leaders fled into exile, France signed an armistice, cooperated with the German Reich economically and politically, and used the new situation to effectuate a transfer of power to a cooperative French State under Marshall Phillipe Pétain.

In the context of World War II Europe, and especially in Vichy France, historians draw a distinction between collaboration and collaborator on the one hand, and the related terms collaborationism and collaborationist on the other. Stanley Hoffmann in 1974 and other historians have used the term collaborationnistes to refer to fascists and Nazi sympathisers who, for anti-communist or other ideological reasons, wished a reinforced collaboration with Hitler's Germany. Collaborationism refers to those, primarily from the fascist right in Vichy France, who embraced the goal of a German victory as their own, whereas collaboration refers to those among the French who for whatever other reason collaborated with the Germans.

== Motivation ==
The reasons for people collaborating with the enemy in wartime is driven by a complex, often overlapping set of motivations. Historically, such actions have been motivated by a desire to mitigate the hardships of occupation, personal gain or alignment with the invader's political and social goals.

The most common (and often involuntary) motive for collaboration is the instinct for survival. In occupied territories, individuals may cooperate to ensure food, safety and employment for themselves and their families. Occupation forces can often compel cooperation through coercion and threats of severe punishment and in extreme cases, individuals (including victims) may cooperate with the enemy to avoid death.

Another motive for collaboration involves individuals having active, often passionate support for the occupier’s worldview and ideology. In some instances, collaborators work with occupiers in the hope of achieving nationalist goals such as independence, territorial gains or strengthening their nation-state.

Opportunism and self-interest, particularly by political, economic and administrative elites can also be another motive for collaboration, often for personal, financial or professional gain. Elites either sought to take control of their countries under the protection of the invader or profiting from the war through the exploitation of resources, confiscation of property and lucrative business contracts with the occupying power or securing a higher social position or special privileges under the new regime.

Collaboration can also be driven by pragmatism, which involves individuals or groups who, while not necessarily sharing the occupier's ideology, believe that cooperation is the best way to manage a difficult situation. It is based on a "lesser evil" argument that portrays collaboration as a way to soften the negative impacts from the occupation or to prevent further destruction under the belief that resistance is futile and will only cause more bloodshed.

Ethnic, religious and social divisions can also drive wartime collaboration. Invaders often exploited existing local tensions to gain support, especially among minority groups in occupied countries who sometimes viewed the invaders as "liberators" from the majority population who often mistreated them or using the occupier to eliminate other local, political or personal rivals.

== Public perceptions of collaborators ==
Public perceptions of wartime collaborators are generally deeply hostile, often viewing them as traitors who violated the traditional political order. However, these perceptions are complex, nuanced and evolve over time, ranging from total condemnation to understanding the, at times, forced nature of the cooperation.

Collaborators are often viewed as traitors, opportunists or cowards who, by working with the enemy, bear responsibility for the occupation and sufferings caused by the enemy. In many cases, these collaborators often faced immediate, harsh punishment, including public humiliation, imprisonment and even summary execution by their own people, even before official legal proceedings are established. However, some collaborators may be viewed as morally ambiguous, with their actions portrayed as necessary evils with their attempts to save others or the country, particularly in hindsight or when analyzing the difficult choices made under extreme conditions. The memory of collaboration can often remain a source of division within societies after a conflict concluded.

Collaboration with occupying forces is a common phenomenon in contexts of military occupation and war. Heonik Kwon observes that those studying modern warfare, particularly under prolonged occupation, often encounter instances of collaboration between the subjugated population and the occupying power. Such cooperation is frequently coerced, as the subjugated may have no choice but to comply in order to avoid further harm or punishment. Kwon notes that collaboration is a recurring element in the history of war.

Timothy Brook highlights the use of the term "collaboration" in the context of World War II, particularly after Philippe Pétain's announcement on 30 October 1940, in which he declared that France would cooperate with Nazi Germany. This statement, following Pétain's meeting with Adolf Hitler, contributed to the negative connotation of the term, as it became associated with political cooperation with occupying forces.

In the Philippines, during the Japanese occupation in World War II, collaboration was similarly seen as a necessary measure by the internee government at the Santo Tomas Internment Camp. Edilberto C. de Jesus and Carlos Quirino explain that collaboration with the Japanese was viewed as the lesser evil, preferable to facing a more direct and oppressive rule.

== History ==
=== Colonialism ===
In some colonial or occupation conflicts, soldiers of native origin were seen as collaborators. This could be the case of mamluks and janissaries in the Ottoman Empire. In some cases, the meaning was not disrespectful at the beginning, but changed with later use when borrowed: the Ottoman term for the sipahi soldiers became sepoy in British India, which in turn was adapted as cipayo in Spanish or zipaio in Basque with a more overtly pejorative meaning of "mercenary".

Harki is the generic term for native Muslim Algerians who served as auxiliaries in the French Army during the Algerian War from 1954 to 1962. The word sometimes applies to all Algerian Muslims (thus including civilians) who supported French Algeria during the war. The motives for enlisting were mixed. They are regarded as traitors in independent Algeria.

=== Napoleonic Wars ===
Afrancesados ("Frenchified" or "French-alike") were upper-and-middle class Spanish supporters of the French occupation of Spain. The afrancesados saw themselves as heirs of enlightened absolutism and saw the arrival of Napoleon as an opportunity to modernize the country.

== Examples ==
=== World War II ===
In World War II, collaborators with Nazi Germany were found in Stalin's Soviet Union and in Western European countries, and Japanese collaborators operated in China.

During World War II, collaboration existed to varying degrees in German-occupied zones, ranging from government officials to celebrities and ordinary citizens. High-profile German collaborators included Dutch actor Johannes Heesters or English-language radio-personality William Joyce (the most widely known Lord Haw-Haw).

==== France ====
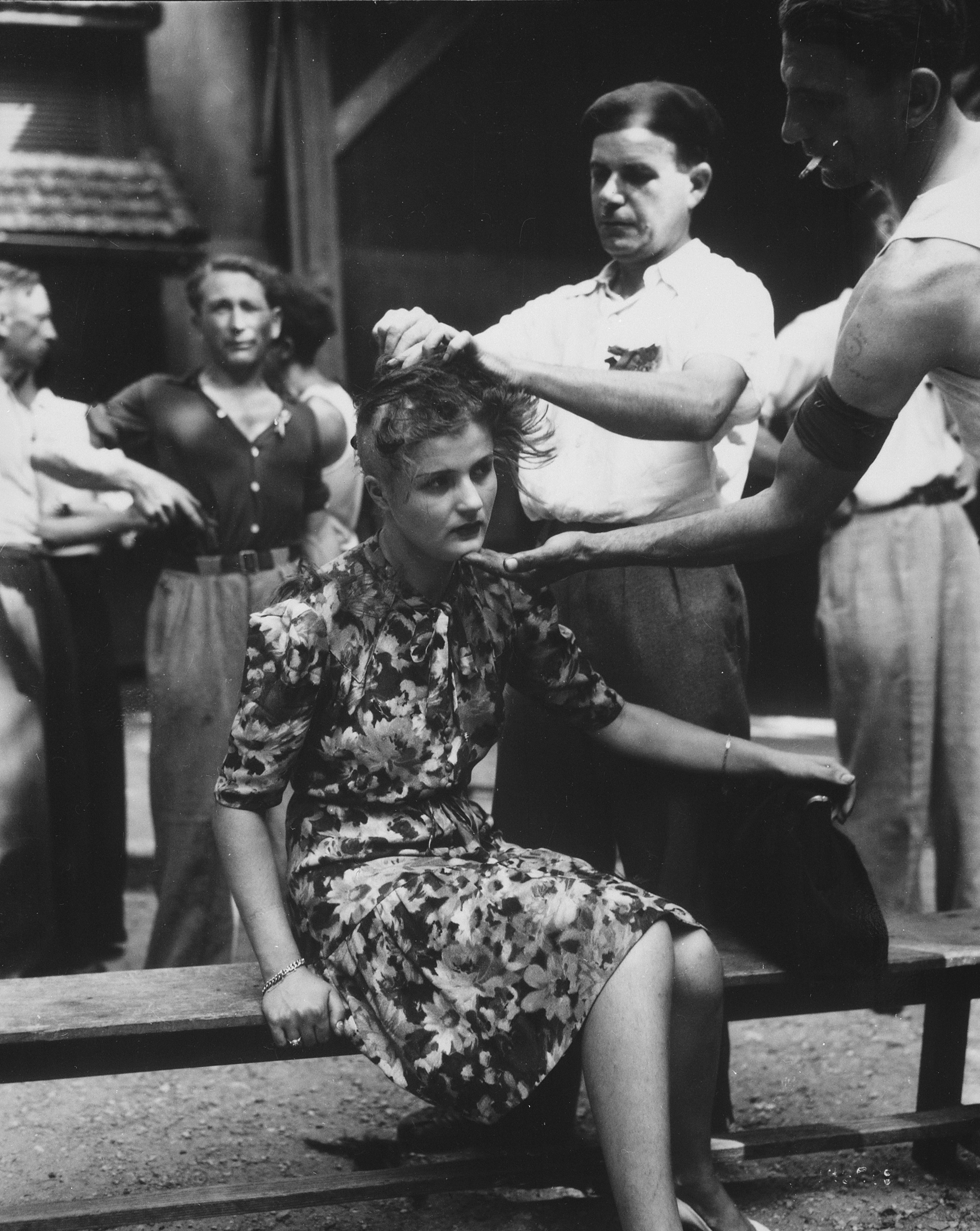
In France after liberation by the Allies, many women had their heads shaved as punishment for having had relationships with Germans.

In France, a distinction emerged between the collaborateur (collaborator) and the collaborationniste (collaborationist). The term collaborationist is mainly used to describe individuals enrolled in pseudo-Nazi parties, often based in Paris, who believed in fascism or were anti-communists. Collaborators on the other hand, engaged in collaboration for pragmatic reasons, such as carrying out the orders of the occupiers to maintain public order (policeman) or normal government functions (civil servants); commerce (including sex workers and other women who had relationships with Germans and were called, "horizontal collaborators"); or to fulfill personal ambitions and greed. Collaborators didn't necessarily believe in fascism or support Nazi Germany.

With the defeat of the Axis, collaborators were often punished by public humiliation, imprisonment, or execution. In France, 10,500 collaborators are estimated to have been executed, some after legal proceedings, others extrajudicially.

British historian Simon Kitson has shown that French authorities did not wait until the Liberation to begin pursuing collaborationists. The Vichy government, itself heavily engaged in collaboration, arrested around 2,000 individuals on charges of passing information to the Germans. They did so to centralise collaboration, ensure that the state maintained a monopoly in Franco-German relations and defend sovereignty so that they could negotiate from a position of strength. It was among the many compromises made by the Vichy government. Adolf Hitler gave Germans in France plentiful opportunities to exploit French weakness and maximize tensions there after June 1940.

On June 25, 1940, Jean Moulin, a French civil servant who served as the first President of the National Council of the Resistance during World War II, was advised by German authorities to sign a declaration condemning an alleged massacre of Chartres civilians by French Senegalese troops. Moulin refused to collaborate, knowing that the bombing massacre was carried out by Germans. He was then incarcerated by the Germans, and cut his throat with glass to prevent himself from giving up information.

==== Low Countries ====
In Belgium, collaborators were organized into the VNV party and the DeVlag movement in Flanders, and into the Rexist movement in Wallonia. There was an active collaboration movement in the Netherlands.

==== Norway ====
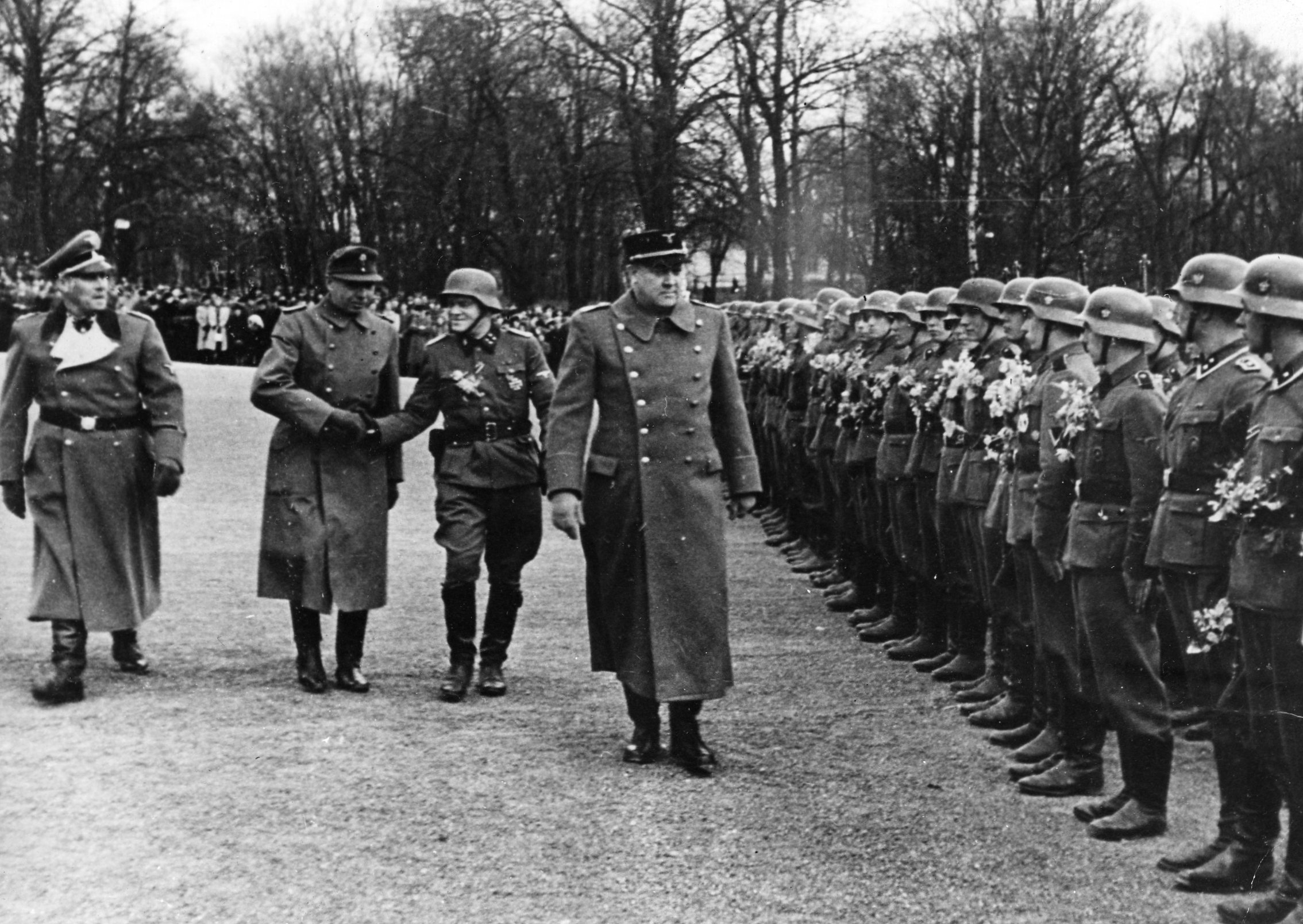
Vidkun Quisling (far right) and Jonas Lie inspect the Norwegian Legion

Vidkun Quisling (1887–1945), a major in the Norwegian Army and former minister of defence. He became minister-president of Norway in 1942, and attempted to Nazify the country, but was fiercely resisted by most of the population. His name is now synonymous with a high-profile government collaborator, now known as a Quisling.

==== Greece ====
After the German invasion of Greece, a Nazi-held government was put in place. All three quisling prime ministers, (Georgios Tsolakoglou, Konstantinos Logothetopoulos and Ioannis Rallis), cooperated with the Axis authorities. Small but active Greek National-Socialist parties, like the Greek National Socialist Party, or openly anti-semitic organisations, like the National Union of Greece, helped German authorities fight the Resistance, and identify and deport Greek Jews. In the last two years of the occupation prime minister Ioanni Rallis, created the Security Battalions, military corps that collaborated openly with the Germans, and had a strong anti-communist ideology. The Security Battalions, along with various far-right and royalist organizations and some of the country's police forces, were directly or indirectly responsible for the brutal killing of thousands of Greeks during the occupation. Contrary to what happened to other European countries, the members of these corps were never tried or punished, due to the Dekemvriana events immediately after the liberation, followed by the White Terror and the Greek Civil War two years later.

==== Yugoslavia ====
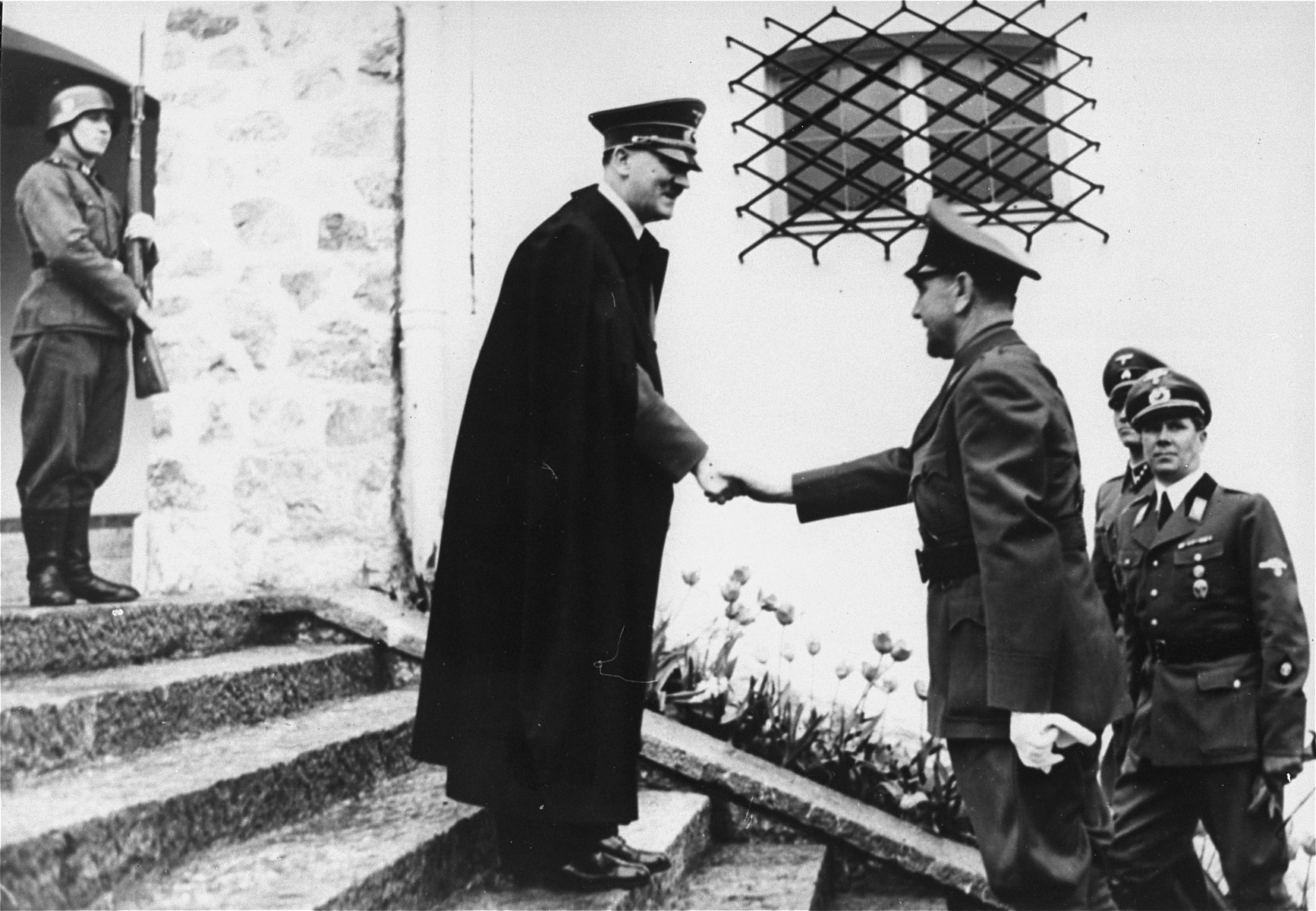
Leader of the Independent State of Croatia, Ante Pavelić, shakes hands with Adolf Hitler in 1941

The main collaborating regime in Yugoslavia was the Independent State of Croatia, a puppet state semi-independent of Nazi Germany. Leon Rupnik (1880–1946) was a Slovene general who collaborated as he took control of the semi-independent region of the Italian-occupied southern Slovenia known as the Province of Ljubljana, and which came under German control in 1943. The main collaborationists in East Yugoslavia were the German-puppet Serbian Government of National Salvation established on the German-occupied territory of Serbia, and the Yugoslav royalist Chetniks, who collaborated tactically with the Axis after 1941.

==== Poland ====
Collaboration in Poland was less institutionalized than in some other countries and has been described as marginal, a point of pride with the Polish people. However, the Soviet Union did find some individuals who would work with them, and this is demonstrated notably by the Lublin government set up by the Soviets in 1944 that operated in opposition to the Polish government-in-exile.

==== Germany ====
German citizen and non-Nazi Franz Oppenhoff accepted appointment as mayor of the German city of Aachen in 1944, under authority of the Allied military command. He was assassinated on orders from Heinrich Himmler in 1945.

==== Vietnam ====
Vietnamese emigres and expatriates living in France gained inspiration from the Nazi occupation in the country. These people believed in many European nationalist ideas at the time — these being a belief in an organic ethnocultural national community and an authoritarian corporatist state and economy. At the time Vietnamese feared that colonialism had "systematically destroyed all elements of social order ... which would have led the intellectual elite to oppose the bolshevization of the country."

When German forces invaded France in May 1940 amid World War II, the French military and government saw a collapse. In addition, six to ten million people were forced to become refugees. The political response was then provoked by the Vietnamese in the country.

France also had a group of Vietnamese students and professionals in Paris called the Amicale annamite. They expressed a heavy dislike for French colonial rule without moving forward with any explicit ideological agenda. Their motives were expanded in 1943, with the addition of wanting to improve the situation of Vietnamese soldiers interned as POWs. This included improvements in conditions at camps, better food, health care, education, and vocational training.

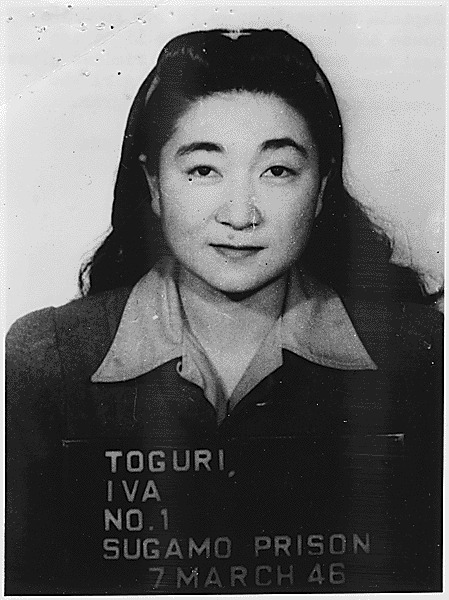
Japanese-American Iva Toguri, known as Tokyo Rose, was tried for treason after World War II for her broadcasts to American troops.

=== 1945–present ===
More recent examples of collaboration have included institutions and individuals in Afghanistan who collaborated with Soviet forces during the Soviet–Afghan War until 1989 and individuals in Iraq and Afghanistan recruited by the Coalition of the Willing. In 2014 during the occupation of Crimea and ongoing War in Donbas, some Ukrainian citizens collaborated with Russian forces.

==== Israeli–Palestinian conflict ====
In Palestinian society, collaboration with Israel is viewed as a serious offence and social stain and is sometimes punished (judicially or extrajudicially) by death. In addition, during the period of 2007–2009, around 30 Palestinians have been sentenced to death in court on collaboration-related charges, although the sentences have not been carried out.

In June 2009, a 15-year-old Palestinian boy named Raed Sualha was tortured and hanged by his family because they suspected him of collaborating with Israel. Authorities of the Palestinian territories launched an investigation into the case and arrested the perpetrators. Police said it was unlikely that such a young boy would have been recruited as an informer.

During the Gaza war, Israel has armed and supported Palestinian anti-Hamas elements and clans such as Yasser Abu Shabab's Popular Forces, leading Hamas to describe them as "traitors". As of June 2025, the Popular Forces control aid routes and territory in eastern Rafah. They acknowledged that they collaborate with Israel. On 4 December 2025, Yasser Abu Shabab was reportedly killed by two Palestinian gunmen near Rafah. The Israeli Army Radio reported that Abu Shabab and a senior commander of the group Ghassan Duhine were wounded in the ambush.

==== War against the Islamic State ====
Governments, non-state actors, and private individuals cooperated and gave assistance to the Islamic State of Iraq and the Levant (ISIL or ISIS) during the Syrian Civil War, Iraqi Civil War, and Libyan Civil War.

==== Russian invasion of Ukraine ====
The Ukrainian government has had broad support from its population, but support for Russia within Ukraine gained prevalence in the Donbas region during the years of Russian occupation. The Ukrainian government has since compiled a "registry of collaborators." It says that pro-Russian collaborators have acted as spotters to assist Russian shelling. Anti-collaboration laws were enacted by Ukrainian President Volodymyr Zelenskyy after the invasion started, with offenders facing 15 years in prison for either collaborating with Russian forces, making public denials about Russian aggression or supporting Russia.

== See also ==
- Business collaboration with Nazi Germany
- Collaboration: Japanese Agents and Local Elites in Wartime China
- Danish collaborator trials
- Defector
- Dissident
- Espionage
- Hanjian
- Hilfspolizei
- Jash (term)
- Jewish collaboration with Nazi Germany
- Medism
- Opposition (politics)
- Pursuit of Nazi collaborators
- Quisling
- Useful Jew
- Grenoble's Saint-Bartholomew

== Bibliography ==
- Kitson, Simon (2008). The Hunt for Nazi Spies, Fighting espionage in Vichy France. Translated by Tihany, Catherine. Chicago: University of Chicago Press. ISBN 9780226438955.
- Webster, Paul (1999). Petain's Crime: The Complete Story of French Collaboration in the Holocaust. Chicago: Ivan R. Dee. ISBN 978-1566632492.
