= 1943 Greek protests against labour mobilization =

- Part of the Greek Resistance against the Axis occupation
- Date: 22 February – 5 March 1943
- Location: Athens, Greece
- Caused by: German plans for forcible labour mobilization of Greek workers in Germany
- Goals: Cancellation of labour mobilization
- Methods: Civil disobedience, civil resistance, demonstrations, burning of records, labour stoppages
- Result: Cancellation of labour mobilization, downfall of Konstantinos Logothetopoulos and appointment of Ioannis Rallis

Parties
Greek collaborationist government, German and Italian occupation authorities	Greek students, civil servants, war veterans, spontaneous or organized by the National Liberation Front

Lead figures
Konstantinos Logothetopoulos	Nikos Ploumbidis

In February–March 1943, a series of large-scale protests took place in Athens against the intended forcible mobilization of occupied Greece's labour force for work in Nazi Germany. The protests, organized spontaneously or by the National Liberation Front (EAM), led to repeated clashes with the occupation troops and the collaborationist Greek police that left several dead. As a result of the protests, especially those of on 24 February and 5 March, the forced labour mobilization was never implemented in Greece. The protests, stoppages and other acts of civil disobedience alarmed the Germans about EAM's increasing influence; the collaborationist prime minister, Konstantinos Logothetopoulos, who was perceived as too weak by the Germans, was replaced by Ioannis Rallis in April, paving the way for a concerted anti-communist drive on behalf of the collaborationist government.

== Background ==
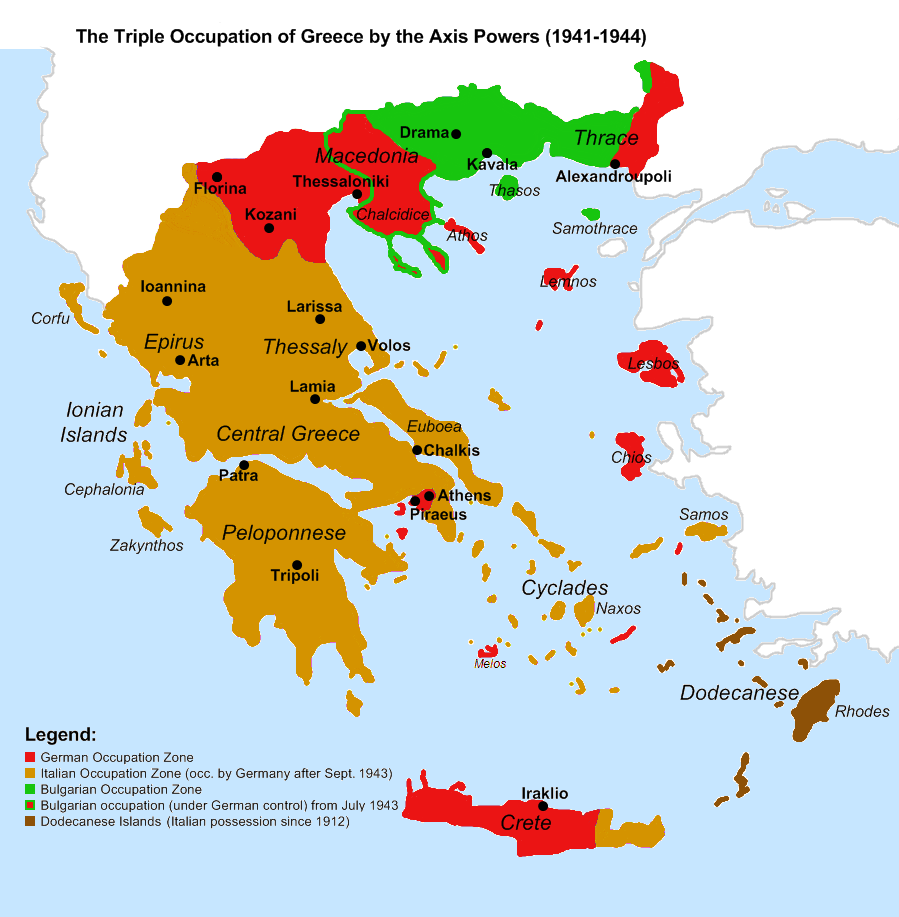
Map of the Axis occupation zones in Greece in early 1943

Faced with increasing manpower shortages in its war industry, and the regime's reluctance to draft German women for ideological reasons, Nazi Germany early on resorted to the use of foreign labour. This search for manpower intensified in 1942, in the aftermath of the Germans' first major defeat in the Battle of Moscow, a fact highlighted by the appointment of Fritz Sauckel as General Plenipotentiary for Labour Deployment in May 1942. In the event, over 8.4 million labourers were forcibly recruited in occupied and allied countries, while over 4.5 million prisoners of war were likewise employed. Although Greece had been occupied by Germany and its Axis allies since April–May 1941, by late 1941, only 550 Greek workers were registered in German factories, compared to over 14,600 from Germany's ally Bulgaria, and 109,000 from conquered Yugoslavia.

Efforts to boost voluntary enlistment began in Greece in early 1942, in the German-occupied zone around Thessaloniki. Based on the high unemployment, the Germans hoped to enlist some 25,000 workers there, and a similar number in the Greek capital, Athens. Initial turnout was very low, forcing German authorities to resort to a combination of civil mobilization, threats that those who did not come forward voluntarily would be sent as auxiliaries to the Eastern Front, as well as an extensive press campaign highlighted the equal pay and insurance with the German workers, the much better food supply in Germany compared to Greece (which had just experienced a catastrophic famine), and the right of free transportation of families to Germany. Those who accepted were sent off with pomp in ceremonies highlighting their contribution to defending Europe from "Asiatic barbarism". Overall, these efforts were judged a failure: by the end of 1942, only 11,977 Greeks had moved to Germany, 20% of them women, intended to work as chambermaids or domestic assistants rather than in factories. The failure was due to a combination of factors: on the one hand, the Greek bureaucracy was not eager to help the scheme, so that Sauckel had to send one of his own men to supervise the drive; while those who were summoned to be recruited usually refused to be sent to Germany. At the same time, the drive was hampered by the generally poor physical condition of prospective candidates due to the malnutrition and diseases ravaging the country as a result of the occupation, the fear of spreading infectious diseases to Germany, and the lack of adequate labour for German industrial interests in Greece itself. Even those Greeks who reached Germany quickly acquired a reputation as unmotivated, quarrelsome, and more trouble than they were worth.

== Protests ==
Since early January 1943, rumours were circulating about the imposition of forced labour conscription in Greece. To calm such fears, the recently appointed prime minister of the collaborationist government, Konstantinos Logothetopoulos, issued an "unequivocal denial" on 12 January that such plans were being made. However, on 30 January 1943, the German commander-in-chief in the Balkans, Alexander Löhr, issued a decree ordering the obligatory registration of all Greek males aged 16 to 45 for labour "away from their permanent place of domicile...in communal groups in camps, if necessary". While the decree was not published until 23 February, rumours of it continued to gain intensity. The decree did not explicitly stipulate work outside Greece, this was widely assumed—at this stage likely incorrectly—by the Greek population to be the case, leading to the outbreak of unrest, especially in the capital, Athens.

On 7 February, the funeral of a student killed in a demonstration in December became the occasion for a gathering of 500 students. Further protests followed, with an alarming participation of civil servants: on 9 February, civil servants gathered to protest outside the building where the collaborationist government was meeting, and strikes were declared in the Bank of Greece, the Municipality of Athens, the Ministry of Finance, private banks, the post, and public transport. The demonstration movement gained momentum, reaching a peak in late February. After municipal employees went on strike on 22 February, and with an even larger demonstration planned for the 24th, on 23 February Logothetopoulos tried to intimidate public employees by threatening that anyone who would participate in demonstrations would be tried not by a Greek court, but a German military tribunal. This had little effect: on 24 February, a massive crowd of students, civil servants and workers protested in central Athens, while staff at several hospitals went on strike to protest the food supply situation. The protesters converged on the Old Royal Palace, where Logothetopoulos had his office. The size of the demonstration caught authorities clearly off guard, as protesters managed to enter the building and even reach Logothetopoulos' office, leading to the police opening fire on them, killing a disabled veteran of the Greco-Italian War. The bulk of the demonstrators moved on the Ministry of Labour, which was guarded by Italian Carabinieri. The Italians opened fire on the crowd, but could not prevent demonstrators from entering the building and setting its first two floors on fire, along with the records that would have been useful to the civil mobilization. The clashes left three dead and 40 wounded protesters; the death of a university student of his wounds prompted demands that lessons be suspended.

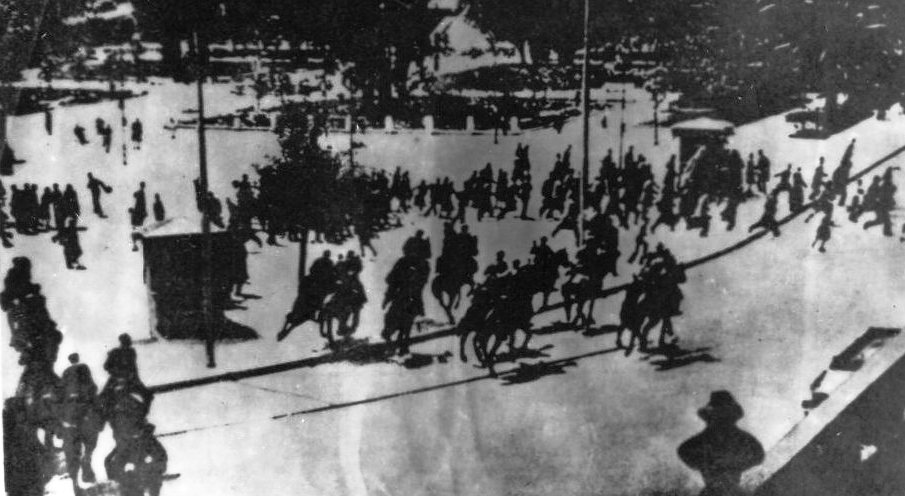
Mounted Italian Carabinieri charge against demonstrators in central Athens

The events of 24 February prompted the collaborationist Interior Minister, Anastasios Tavoularis, to demand the forcible dissolution of any protest by arms, and threatened any member of the police or gendarmerie who hesitated to do so with severe penalties. On 25 February, the staff of the Telephone Company, which was under direct German supervision, went on strike. German troops arrived at the main telecommunications building and arrested over 200 employees and shut them in the basement, but they managed to escape while the Germans awaited the arrival of paddy wagons. Even school students went on strike, over several days, resulting in the death of one of them at the hands of the Carabinieri. On 27 February, Kostis Palamas, revered as Greece's national poet, died. His funeral, held on the next day, drew an enormous crowd, and turned into a public demonstration of defiance of the occupying powers, whose representatives were greeted by the crowd with the Greek national anthem and shouts of 'Long Live Freedom'. On the same day, following a call by the leftist National Liberation Front (EAM) for a general strike, about 3,500 demonstrators gathered in the central Omonoia Square, with placards attacking the Axis. Anti-Axis sentiment came more and more to the open: Italian reports claimed that a church mass was concluded with shouts of 'Long Live Greece' and 'Long Live the Red Army', while at the neighbourhood of Kypseli disabled war veterans interrupted the service to harangue the congregation against civil mobilization.

On 3 March, a German armoured column paraded through Athens in an attempt of intimidation, but without success: a general strike of all civil servants was declared for the next day. Finally, on 5 March, EAM called for another general strike. Despite the snow and bitter cold, some 100,000 demonstrators gathered in central Athens at 11:00, with banners denouncing civil mobilization and the collaborationist government. The demonstration again headed for the Ministry of Labour, where they were confronted by police, which opened fire, killing five and wounding about fifty demonstrators, but the crowd, armed with pieces of wood and stones, again managed to penetrate the building's two lower floors, which were set on fire, completing the destruction wrought on 24 February. Other demonstrators stormed the Athens City Hall to burn the electoral rolls. According to German records, 65% of all civil servants as well as most students had obeyed EAM's call for a general strike; the government had to pre-emptively close all ministries for five days. Similar demonstrations in Piraeus on the same day cost the lives of three demonstrators, while protest marches also took place in Thessaloniki, Volos, Kalamata, Sparti, and Corinth.

== Aftermath ==
In order to calm matters, on the next day, 6 March, Logothetopoulos issued a proclamation attributing the riots to communist subversion, but conceded that no civil mobilization was planned, and that no workers would be deported to Germany for labour. This was confirmed by the widely esteemed Archbishop of Athens, Damaskinos. This was a significant victory over the occupation authorities, making Greece the only occupied country to avoid forcible labour mobilization for work in Germany. Over 1943, only 2,653 Greek workers moved to Germany.

In addition, the Germans agreed to substantial pay rise of 35% in the sectors of the economy working for the German Wehrmacht, but this failed to improve the economic situation or increase labour employment in the German interests. The atmosphere continued to be tense, and acts of defiance, protests and labour strikes continued over the next months, including a massive demonstration on 25 March, Greek Independence Day, and another EAM-sponsored general strike on 25 June. To the Axis, the alarming rise of the "communist threat" confirmed the inability of Logothetopoulos to deal with the situation: on 6 April, he was replaced by the veteran royalist, bourgeois politician Ioannis Rallis, which with German sanction began a concerted program of political and military measures to deal with EAM and the threat it posed to the established Greek social order.

== Sources ==
- Fleischer, Hagen (2020). Krieg und Nachkrieg: Das schwierige deutsch-griechische Jahrhundert [War and Post-War: The Difficult German–Greek Century] (in German). Cologne: Vandenhoeck & Ruprecht. ISBN 978-341251790-8.
- Grigoriadis, Solon (2011) [1973]. Ιστορία της Σύγχρονης Ελλάδας 1941-1974. Τόμος 1 – Κατοχή: Η μεγάλη νύχτα [History of Modern Greece 1941-1974. Volume 1 – The Occupation: The Great Night] (in Greek). Athens: POLARIS. ISBN 978-960-9487-63-4.
- Haralambidis, Menelaos (2023). Οι Δωσίλογοι: Ένοπλη, πολιτική και οικονομική συνεργασία στα χρόνια της Κατοχής [The Collaborators: Armed, Political and Economic Collaboration During the Occupation] (in Greek). Athens: Alexandreia. ISBN 978-618-223-034-3.
- Hatziiosif, Christos (2007). "Η ελληνική οικονομία, πεδίο μάχης και αντίστασης" [The Greek economy, battlefield and target of resistance]. In Hatziiosif, Christos; Papastratis, Prokopis (eds.). Ιστορία της Ελλάδας του 20ού αιώνα, Γ' Τόμος: Β' Παγκόσμιος Πόλεμος. Κατοχή – Αντίσταση 1940–1945, Μέρος 2ο. [History of Greece in the 20th Century, Volume III: World War II. Occupation and Resistance 1940–1945, Part 2] (in Greek). Athens: Bibliorama. pp. 181–217. ISBN 978-960-8087-06-4.
- Kochanski, Halik (2023). Resistance: The Underground War in Europe, 1939-1945. London: Penguin Books Ltd. ISBN 978-0-14-197901-4.
- Mazower, Mark (1993). Inside Hitler's Greece: The Experience of Occupation, 1941–44. New Haven and London: Yale University Press. ISBN 0-300-06552-3.
