= Georgios Bakos =

Greek soldier and officer

- Γεώργιος Μπάκος

Minister of National Defense of Greece
- In office 30 April 1941 – 7 April 1943
- Prime Minister: Georgios Tsolakoglou; Konstantinos Logothetopoulos
- Preceded by: Theodoros Panagakos
- Succeeded by: Ioannis Rallis

Personal details
- Born: Georgios Bakos c. 1892 Athens, Kingdom of Greece
- Died: 6 January 1945 (aged 52)

Military service
- Allegiance: Kingdom of Greece; Second Hellenic Republic; Hellenic State
- Branch/service: Hellenic Army
- Years of service: 1912–1943
- Rank: Major general
- Battles/wars: Balkan Wars; Greco-Turkish War (1919-1922); World War II: Greco-Italian War; Battle of Greece

Georgios Bakos (Greek: Γεώργιος Μπάκος, 1892–1945) was a Hellenic Army major general and leading collaborationist with Nazi Germany during the Axis occupation of Greece.

== Life ==
Born in Athens in 1892, Bakos became a career officer of the artillery and fought in the Balkan Wars of 1912–1913 and in the Asia Minor Campaign in 1920–1922. As a major general, he commanded the 3rd Infantry Division in the Greco-Italian War of 1940–41.

After the German invasion of Greece and the Hellenic Army's capitulation, he served as Minister of National Defence in the collaborationist government set up by Lieutenant General Georgios Tsolakoglou on 30 April 1941, and retained the post under Tsolakoglou's successor, Konstantinos Logothetopoulos, until the Logothetopoulos cabinet resigned on 7 April 1943. An ardent Germanophile and anti-communist, who remained convinced of Germany's ultimate victory even after the German defeats in the Eastern Front and North Africa in 1942, Bakos helped in the formation of the national-socialist ESPO organization. In late 1941 he tried, without success, to raise a Greek volunteer unit (a "Blue-and-White Division", Κυανόλευκος Μεραρχία) to fight along the German Wehrmacht in the Eastern Front. This failed due to lack of enthusiasm even among the collaborationist government—where it was supported only by the likewise ardently Germanophile Logothetopoulos and Sotirios Gotzamanis—as well as the refusal of the organizations representing the disbanded Hellenic Army's officer corps and reservist associations to participate.

After the country's liberation, he was arrested and placed in Averof prison in Athens awaiting trial. During the Dekemvriana events, a group of EAM-ELAS guerrillas under officer Stavros Mavrothalassitis attacked the prison. Bakos was taken prisoner and after a court-martial was executed as a traitor on 6 January 1945.

== Sources ==
- Close, David H. (2013). The Origins of the Greek Civil War. Routledge. ISBN 978-1317898528.
- Priovolos, Giannis (2018). Εθνικιστική «αντίδραση» και Τάγματα Ασφαλείας [Nationalist "Reaction" and the Security Battalions] (in Greek). Athens: Patakis. ISBN 978-960-16-7561-9.
- Μεγάλη Στρατιωτικὴ καὶ Ναυτικὴ Ἐγκυκλοπαιδεία. Tόμος Τέταρτος: Καβάδης–Μωριάς [Great Military and Naval Encyclopaedia. Volume IV: Kavadh–Morea] (in Greek). Athens: Ἔκδοσις Μεγάλης Στρατιωτικῆς καὶ Ναυτικῆς Ἐγκυκλοπαιδείας. 1929. p. 665. OCLC 31255024.

Political offices
Preceded by Theodoros Panagakos as Minister of Military Affairs in the government-in-exile	Minister of National Defence of Greece (Collaborationist government); 30 April 1941 – 7 April 1943	Succeeded by Ioannis Rallis
