= List of people from Giannitsa =

This is list of notable people who are from Giannitsa, Greece (Turkish: Yenice-i Vardar, Bulgarian: Pazar / Пазар), or have spent a large part or formative part of their career in that city.

== From Giannitsa ==
=== A ===
- (Greece) Agatonik (b. 1964), bishop of Orthodox church of Alexandria
- (Turkey) Āgehī (? – 1577/8), Ottoman poet and writer
- (Greece) Effie Achtsioglou (b. 1985), Greek politician who served as Minister of Labour from 2016 to 2019
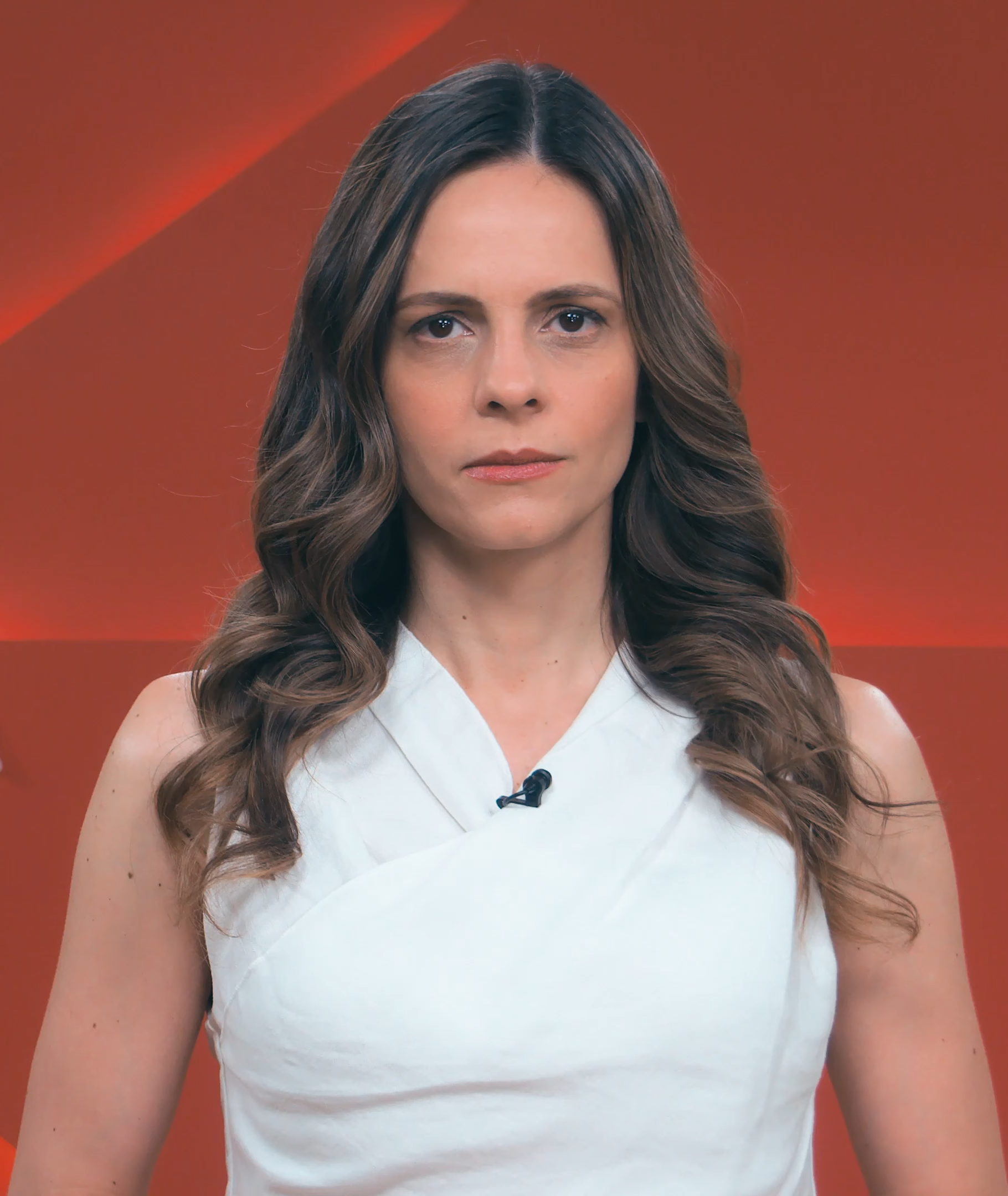
- Effie Achtsioglou
  (Greece) Melina Aslanidou, Greek singer, born in Germany

=== B ===
- (Greece) Dimitrios Barlautas (? – 1822), Greek teacher and fighter of the Greek War of Independence
- (Bulgaria) Harish Bozhkov (1865 – 1948), Bulgarian businessman and komitadji of the IMARO
- (Greece) (Bulgaria) Manol Bozhkov (1859 – 1910), doctor, public figure and folklorist
- (Bulgaria) (Serbia) Mihail (Miltiyadi) Bozhkov (? – 1912), Serbian officer

=== C ===
- (Greece) Ioanna Chamalidou (b. 1996), Greek professional footballer

=== D ===
- (Turkey) Deruni, Ottoman mathematician and poet
- (Bulgaria) Papa Dimo, Bulgarian priest and teacher
- (Bulgaria) Archimandrite Dionisii (1842 – ?), Bulgarian priest
- (Bulgaria) Dionis Dala (1862 – 1913), Bulgarian komitadji of the IMARO
- (Turkey) Ahmet Derviş (1882 – 1932), Turkish general
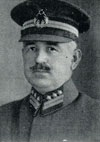
- Ahmet Derviş
  (Greece) Stefan Devrelis (b. 1972), Greek clergyman, bishop of Ecumenical Patriarchate of Constantinople
- (Greece) Christos Didaskalou (? – 1907), Greek makedonomachos
- (Greece) Gyorche Dimchev (? – 1947), Greek communist, arrested in 1947 and executed by firing squad
- (Bulgaria) Mile Dinev, Bulgarian komitadji of the IMARO, chetnik of Shteryo Yunana
- (Bulgaria) Dionisii Ivanov Dionisiev – Dion (1908 - 1992), Bulgarian painter, marinist
- (Greece) Todor Doychinov - Morava (1919 – 1947), Greek communist
- (Greece) Todor Doychinov (1921 – 1947), Greek communist and partisan of NOF
- (Bulgaria) Dimitar Dzhutev (1878 - ?), Bulgarian teacher and later priest

=== E ===
- (Turkey) Emin Bey (?), descendent of Gazi Evrenos and last Ottoman ruler of Giannitsa

=== F ===
- (Bulgaria) Grigor Fotselarov (1872 – ?), Bulgarian komitadji of the IMARO

=== G ===
- (Turkey) Garibi, Ottoman scientist, poet and dervish during rule of Suleyman I
- (Greece) Sotirios Gotzamanis (1885 – 1958), Greek politician
- (Greece) Sotirios Gotzamanis (1918 – 1944), Greek communist, he gained education in Tsotili, sided with ELAS during World War II and died near Bubakevo
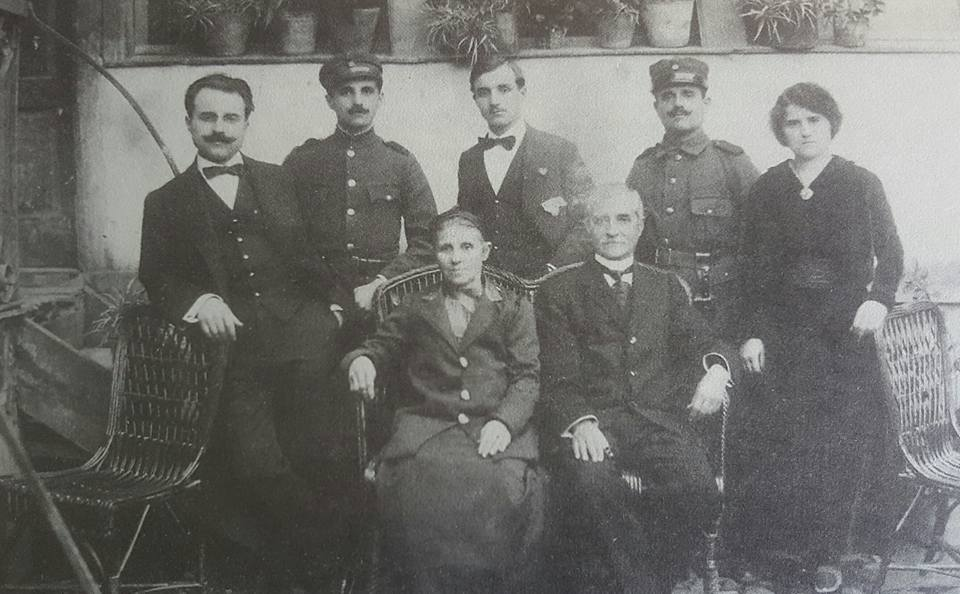
  The Gotzamanis family, one of the most prominent Greek families of Giannitsa, in a photograph, after the Battle of 1912, at their home. Seated in the middle are the kodjabashis and steward Petros Gotzamanis and his wife Aikaterini Gotzamani. On the far right is their daughter, and on the far left is their son, Sotirios Gotzamanis.
- (Socialist Federal Republic of Yugoslavia) (North Macedonia) Trapche (Trifon) Grekov (1893 – 1973), doctor, publicist and activist of Yugoslav resistance during WW2
- (Bulgaria) Toma Grkov (1888 – ?), Bulgarian komitadji of the IMARO
- (Bulgaria) Grigor Gugushev, Bulgarian komitadji of the IMARO
- (Bulgaria) Petar Gyupchanov (1869 - ?), Bulgarian businessman and komitadji of the IMARO

=== H ===
- (Turkey) Hayali (? – 1556), Ottoman poet and dervish
- (Turkey) Hayreti and Sinechak (Yusuf) brothers, Ottoman poets
- (Bulgaria) Kocho Hadzhigaev (1880 - ?), Bulgarian revolutionary and public figure
- (Bulgaria) Nikola Hadziivanov (1865 – ?), Bulgarian komitadji of the IMARO
- (Bulgaria) Hristo Hadzhikoychev (c. 1882 - ?), Bulgarian teacher and komitadji of the IMARO
- (Bulgaria) Kocho Hadzhirindov (1883 - 1977), Bulgarian public figure and federalist
- (Bulgaria) Petar Hadzhirindov (1879 - 1937), Bulgarian teacher and komitadji of the IMARO
- (Bulgaria) Nonde (Paminonda) Hadzhistoyanov (? - 1906), Bulgarian komitadji of the IMARO
- (Bulgaria) Gotse Hadzhitraev (Kusitraykov), member of Apostol Petkov's cheta, killed by the Giannitsa lake
- (Bulgaria) Mitso Hadzhitraev (1867 - ?), Bulgarian komitadji of the IMARO
- (Bulgaria) Georgi Harizanov (1872 – ?), Bulgarian komitadji of the IMARO
- Hristo Harizanov (1888 – 1965), Bulgarian politician, mayor of Nessebar, Bulgaria
- (Greece) Theodoros Horopanitis (1876 – 1929) Greek businessman and photographer, believed to have been the photographer of the makedonomachoi
- Hristo K. Hristov, member of the Ilinden organization in Nessebar, Bulgaria
- (Bulgaria) Traycho Hristov (1880 – 1907), Bulgarian revolutionary and teacher

=== K ===
- (Turkey) Khayali (? – 1556), Ottoman poet
- (Bulgaria) Hristo Kalaydzhiev (1886 – 1964), Bulgarian politician komitadji of the IMARO
- (Bulgaria) Dionis Kapitanov (1878 - after 1943), Bulgarian komitadji of the IMARO
- (Greece) Dimitrios Karadolamis (b. 1987), Greek professional basketball player
- (Greece) Theofilos Karasavvidis (b. 1971), Greek former professional footballer
- (Bulgaria) Georgi Kayafov (1894 – ?), Bulgarian public figure, activist of Bulgarian club of Thessaloniki and axis collaborator during World War II
- (Bulgaria) Mihail Kayafov (1872 - ?), Bulgarian businessman and komitadji of the IMARO
- (Greece) Petar Kazov (1909 – 1941–45), Greek communist, died in German concentration camp
- (Bulgaria) Dionis Kirkitov, Bulgarian teacher and public figure
- (Greece) Ioannis Kourkourikis (b. 1971), Greek Olympic rower
- (Turkey) Hasan Hüsnü Kitapçı (1886 – 1947), Turkish politician
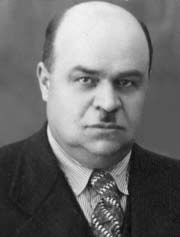
  Hasan Hüsnü Kitapçı
- (Bulgaria) Nikola Klyantev, Bulgarian komitadji of the IMARO, died in Nessebar
- (Bulgaria) Yosif Kokonchev, (1909 – 1995), Bulgarian presbyterian cleric
- (Bulgaria) Ivan Konstantinov, Bulgarian teacher
- (Bulgaria) Toma Nikolov Kronev (1887 – 1979), komitadji and courier of IMARO
- (Bulgaria) Kostadin Kuleliev, master of the fish esnaf in the town and currier of Apostol Petkov in beginning of 20th century

=== L ===
- (Bulgaria) Dimitar Leshnikov (? – 1910), Bulgarian komitadji of the IMARO

=== M ===
- (Greece) Makarios (b. 1937), bishop of Ecumenical Patriarchate of Constantinople
- (Bulgaria) Hristo Mandalchev (? – 1904), Bulgarian teacher, businessman and komitadji of the IMARO
- (Bulgaria) Ivan Mandalchev (1882 - ?), Bulgarian komitadji of the IMARO
- (Greece) Thomas Mangriotis (1882 – 1944), Greek politician, mayor of Giannitsa
- (Greece) Ioannis Michailidis (b. 2000), Greek professional footballer
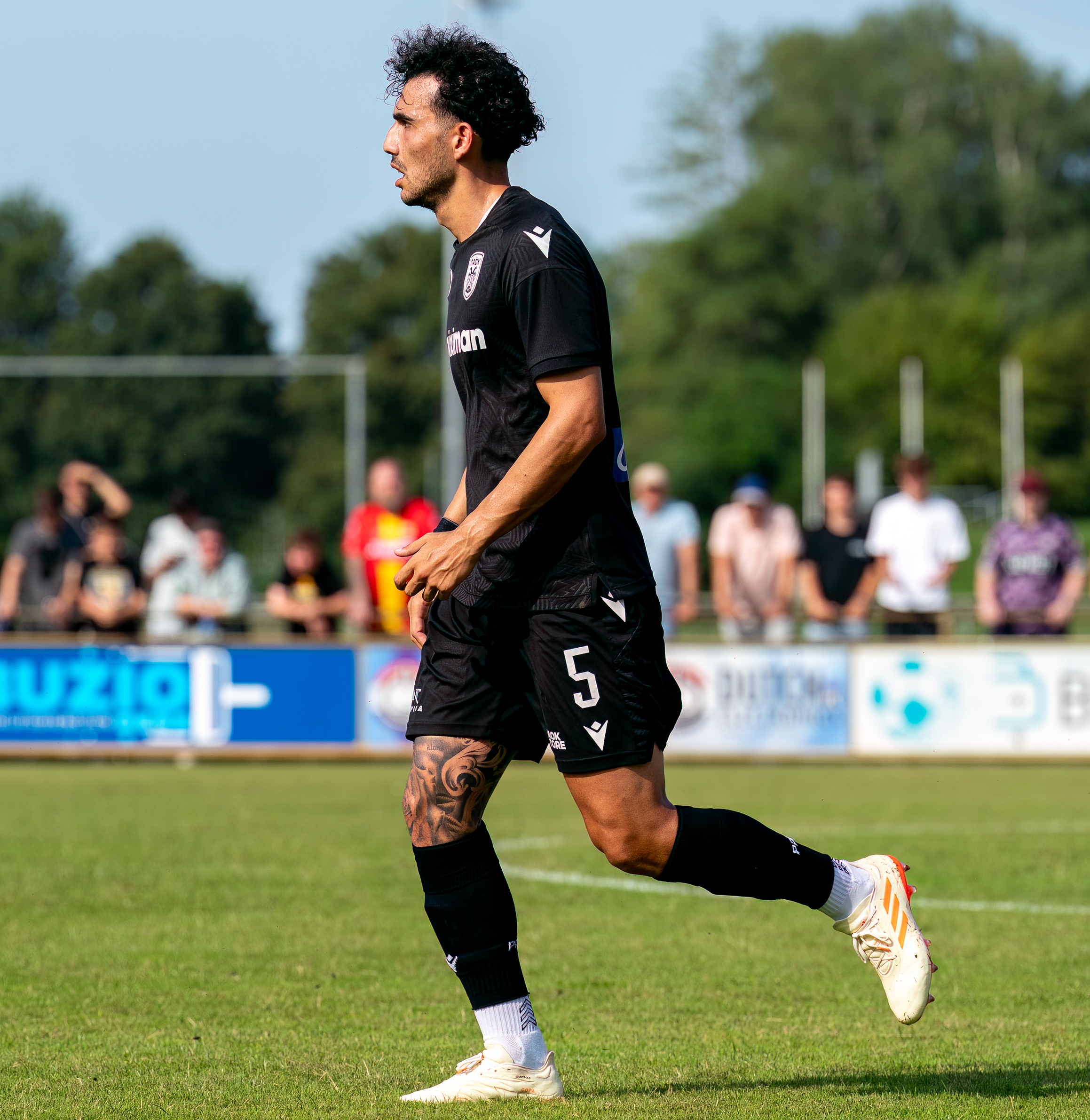
  Ioannis Michailidis
- (Bulgaria) Boris Mokrev (1861 – 1933), Bulgarian politician and mayor of Tarnovo
- (Bulgaria) Grigor Mokrev, Bulgarian catholic and later orthodox teacher and revolutionary
- (Bulgaria) Stoyan Mokrev, Bulgarian catholic priest and teacher
- (Bulgaria) Anna Mokreva (?), Bulgarian teacher and writer
- (Bulgaria) Dimitar Murtov (1882 - after 1943), Bulgarian revolutionary from IMARO
- (Greece) Elisavet Mystakidou (р. 1977), taekwondo athlete and Olympic silver medalist

=== N ===
- (Bulgaria) Dimitar Nanov (1910 – 1958), Bulgarian painter
- (Greece) Georgi Nikezov (1915 – 1947), Greek communist, member of GCP from 1943; arrested after Verkiza treaty, sentenced to death by military court and executed in 1947
- (Bulgaria) Todor (Tode) Nikezov (1881 – 1909), Bulgarian komitadji of the IMARO
- (Bulgaria) Grigor Nikolov (? – 1930), Bulgarian komitadji of the IMARO

=== P ===
- (Bulgaria) Ivan Palyoshev (1880 - ?), Bulgarian komitadji of the IMARO
- (Greece) Dimosthenis Papadimitriou (b. 1943), Greek politician
- (Greece) Dimitrios Pelkas (b. 1993), Greek professional footballer
- (Bulgaria) Angel Petrov (1883 - ?), Bulgarian diplomat and publicist
- Grigor Petrov, Bulgarian komitadji of the IMARO, died in Nessebar, Bulgaria
- (Bulgaria) Toma Popgonov (1878 – 1936), Bulgarian priest
- (Serbia) Antonie Pophristich (1871 – 1950), Serbian diplomat
- (Bulgaria) Dionisii Popstankov (1887 – ?), Bulgarian chemist
- (Bulgaria) Georgi Pophristov (1879 – 1913), Bulgarian komitadji of the IMARO
- (Bulgaria) Grigor Popstankov (1879 - 1964), Bulgarian teacher and komitadji of the IMARO
- (Bulgaria) Stanko Popstankov (1884 – ?), Bulgarian komitadji of the IMARO
- (Bulgaria) Dimitar (Mite) Popstavrev (1871 - ?), Bulgarian komitadji of the IMARO
- (Bulgaria) Dimitar Pozharliev (1872 – ?), Bulgarian teacher
- (Bulgaria) Ivan Pozharliev, (1868 – 1943), Bulgarian officer and komitadji of the IMARO
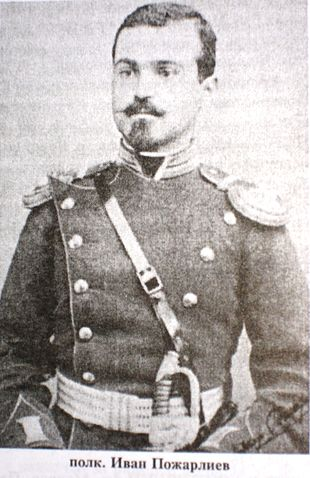
  Colonel Ivan Pozharliev
- (Bulgaria) Toma Pozharliev (1870 – 1938), Bulgarian komitadji of the IMARO

=== S ===
- (Turkey) Selmani, Ottoman poet and dervish
- (Turkey) Sidki, Ottoman poet and kadiya (judge)
- (Bulgaria) Kiril Shkutov, Bulgarian axis collaborator and mayor of occupied Samothrace between 1941 and 1942 during World War II
- (Greece) Yordana Slatnikova (1924 - 1948), Greek communist, member of EPON in Pella since 1943, soldier of ELAS and DAG, died in Grammos in 1948
- (Bulgaria) Hristo Srbinov (1882 - ?), Bulgarian komitadji of the IMARO
- (Greece) Emmanuil Stamatiadis (1841 – 1924), icon painter
- (Greece) Dionysios Stamenitis (b. 1968), Greek politician
- (Turkey) Hasan Sunahi, Ottoman poet

=== T ===
- (Greece) Georgios Tanos (1937 - 2013), Greek medic and politician
- (Bulgaria) Dimitar Tapkov (1848 – 1899), Bulgarian teacher
- (Greece) Georgi Terziev (1913 – 1947), Greek communist, born in poor family, his father died in prison in 1913, member of GCP since 1943, member of politbureu of communist party in Giannitsa, arrested in July 1947, tried and sentenced to death by firesquad
- (Bulgaria) Georgi Traykov (1857 – 1913), Bulgarian priest, exiled by Greek authorities to Trikeri island, where he died
- (Bulgaria) Toma Traykov (1911 – 1991), Bulgarian revolutionary and politician
- (Greece) Makis Tsitas (b. 1971), Greek writer and critic
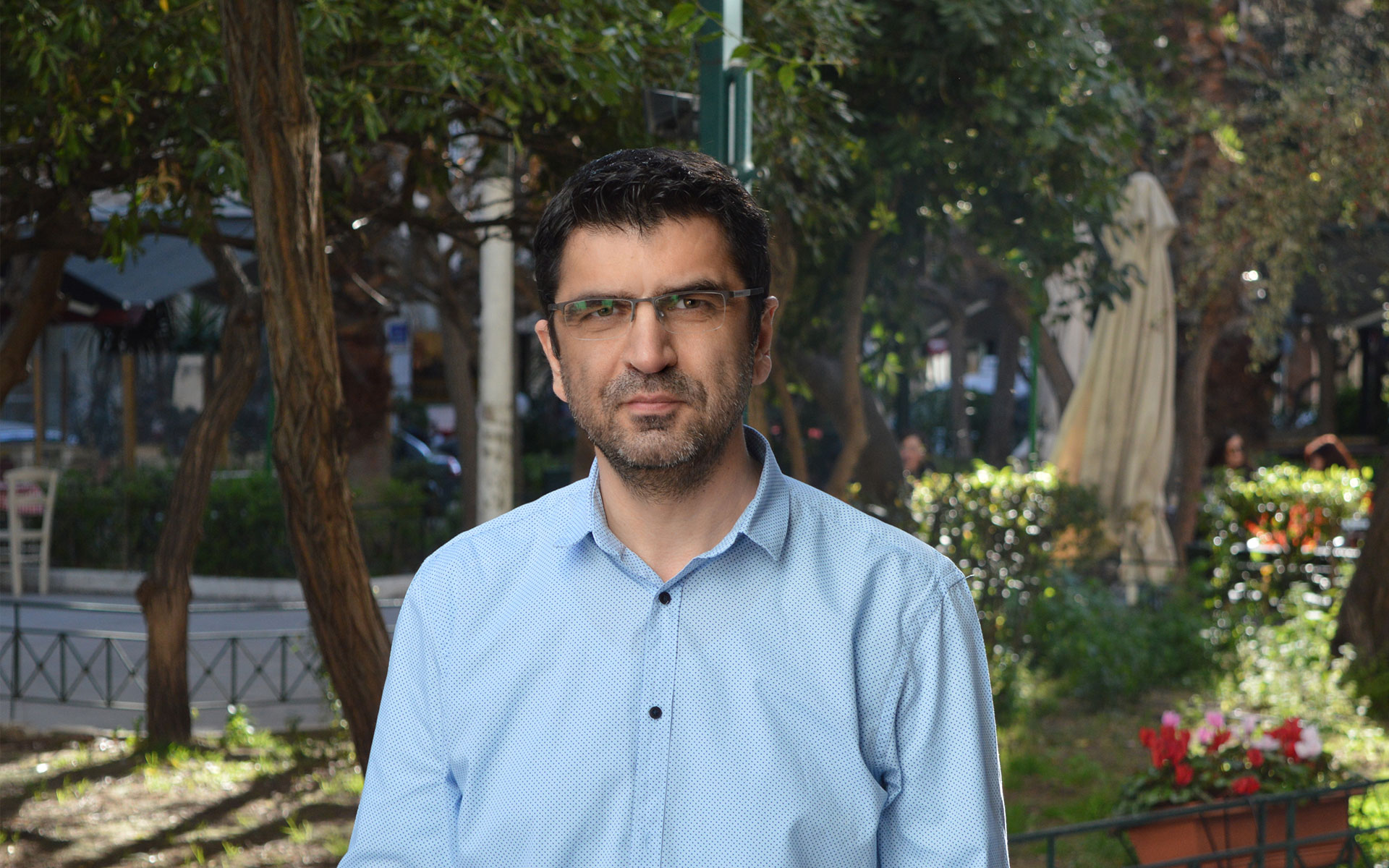
  Makis Tsitas
- (Greece) Christos Tsitroudis (b. 1980), indie pop composer known as 'monsieur minimal'
- (Bulgaria) Dime Tortopov (? - 1912/1913), Bulgarian teacher and revolutionary

=== U ===
- (Turkey) Usually (? – 1538), Ottoman Sufi poet and mystic
- (Greece) Kosta Fotov Urumov (1920 – 1947), Greek communist, member of OKNE from 1941, instructur in Kufalia, and member of Edessa committee of EPON, killed in 1947.

=== V ===
- (Greece) Aikaterini Varela (1860 – 1904), Greek makedonomachos
- (Greece) Elisavet Varela (1890 – 1972), Greek makedonomachos
- (Greece) Alexandros Varitimiadis (1994 – 2023), Greek former professional basketball player who last played for the Raiffeisen Dornbirn Lions
- (Greece) Andreas Varsakopoulos (b. 1990), Greek director, producer, and actor in Seoul, South Korea

=== Y ===
- (Turkey) Yakup Ağa (XV c.), Ottoman spahi, father of Hayreddin Barbarossa
- (Bulgaria) Dimitar Yanev (1880 - ?), Bulgarian public figure
- (Greece) Gonos Yiotas (1880 – 1911), Renowned Greek leader of the Macedonian Struggle in the Giannitsa region

=== Z ===
- (Bulgaria) Georgi Zaharinchev (1884 – 1955), Bulgarian trader and IMARO activist, died in Sofia

== Died in Giannitsa ==
- (Turkey) Evrenos bey (? – 1417), early Ottoman commander
- (Greece) (Socialist Federal Republic of Yugoslavia) Mirka Ginova (1923 – 1946), Greek communist partisan, praised as a hero in Yugoslavia
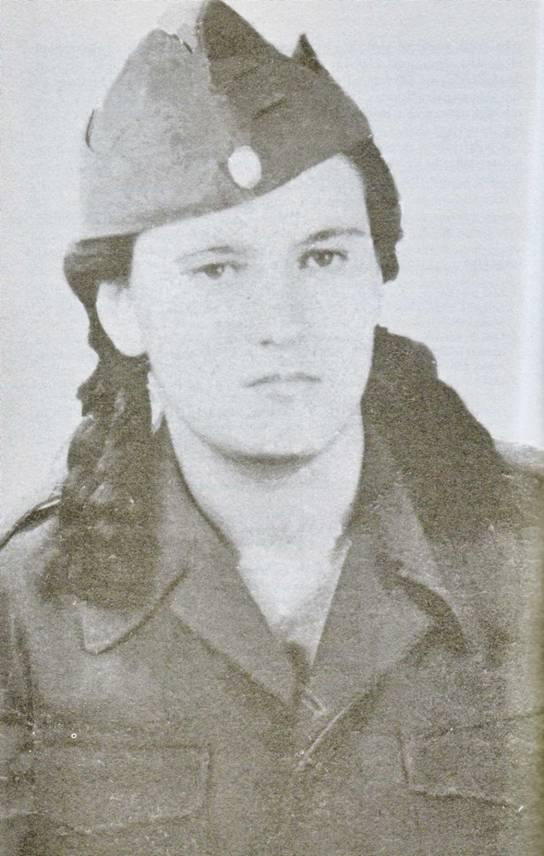
- Mirko Ginova
  (Turkey) Sheikh Ilahi) (? - 1491), Ottoman missionary and member of Nakshbendi order
- (Bulgaria) Trayko Kalaydzhiev (1860 – 1910), Bulgarian priest and komitadji
- (Greece) Vasilios Kapsampelis (1864 – 1912), Greek general and makedonomachos
- (Greece) Nikandros Papaioannou (1877 – 1966), Greek priest and makedonomachos
- (Greece) Dimitrios Polizopoulos (1880 – 1912), Greek makedonomachos
- (Greece) Hristos Prantounas (1873 – 1906), Greek makedonomachos
- (Greece) Theodoros Tsiftes, Greek makedonomachos, renegade from the IMRO

== Connected to Giannitsa ==
- (Greece) Tellos Agras (c. 1880 – 1907), Greek makedonomachos who led a unit around the Giannitsa Lake, executed nearby
- (Turkey) Aruj Barbarossa (1474 – 1518), Ottoman admiral, his father was from Yenice-i Vardar
- (Turkey) Hayreddin Barbarossa (1499 – 1546), Ottoman admiral, his father was from Yenice-i Vardar
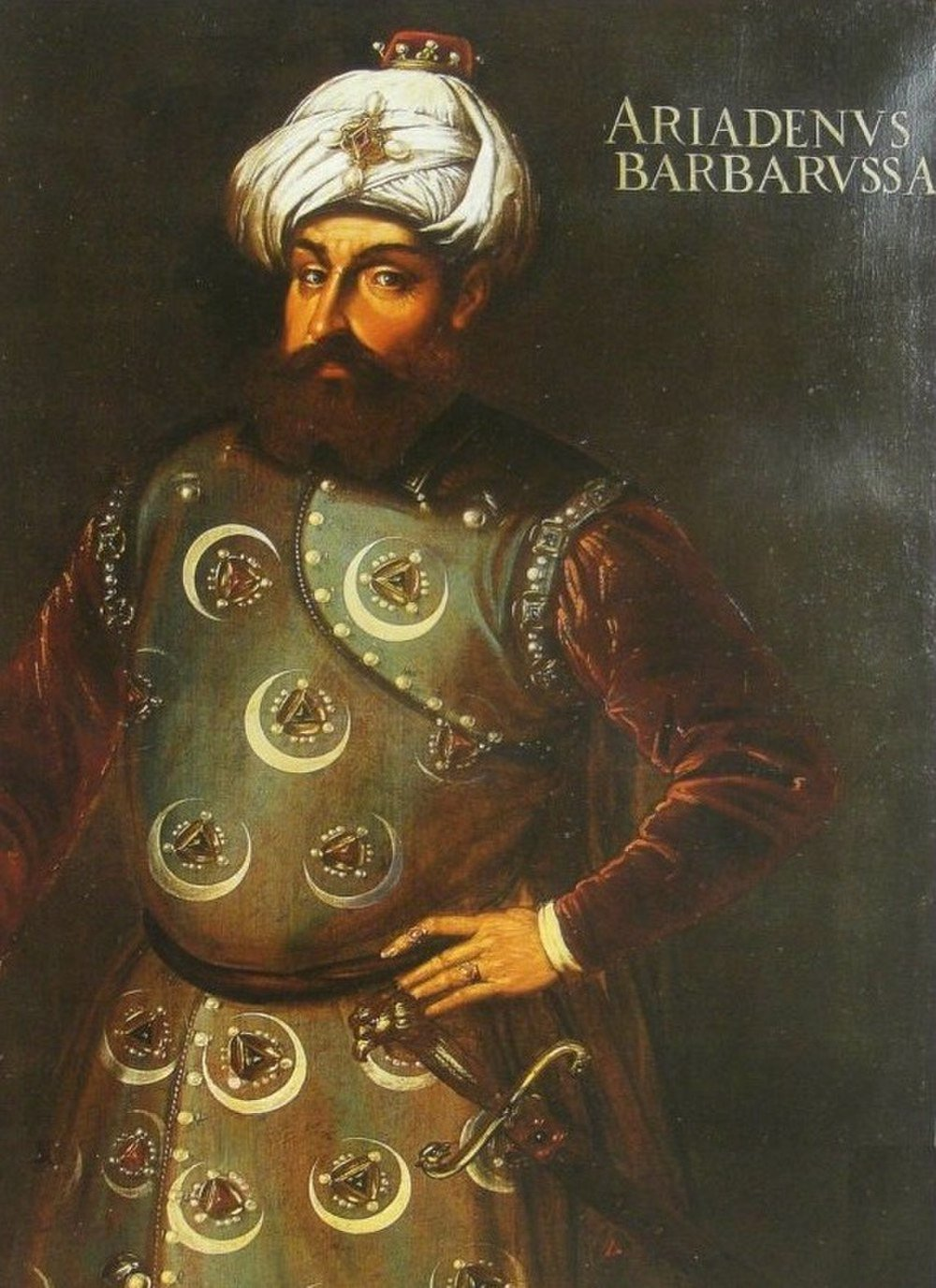
- Hayreddin Barbarossa
  (Greece) Konstantinos Boukouvalas (1877 – 1932) Greek makedonomachos who led a unit around the Giannitsa Lake
- (Greece) Ioannis Demestichas (1882 – 1960) Greek makedonomachos who led a unit around the Giannitsa Lake
- (Bulgaria) Bozhana Dimitrova (b. 1940), Bulgarian radio journalist
- (Bulgaria) Georgi Djulgerov (b. 1943), Bulgarian cinema scenarist, producer and director, has descent from Giannitsa
- (Serbia) Mihajlo Dzhordzhevic (1851 – 1891), Serbian photographer
- (Greece) Pipi Kirici, Greek communist, born in the region, member of DAG, participated in many fights during Greek civil war
- (Greece) Eleni Laskaridou, Greek teacher in Yenice-i Vardar around 1900 during the Macedonian Struggle
- (Turkey) Syuleyman Nahifi bey, Ottoman politician, kaymakan of Giannitsa after 1900
- (Bulgaria) Apostol Petkov (1869 – 1911), Bulgarian komitadji from IMARO, leading voyvode in the region of Giannitsa
- (Bulgaria) Nikola Shkutov, Bulgarian clergy man and chairman of Bulgarian Exarchist church community in the city
- (Turkey) Hasan Tahsin Uzer (1877 – 1939), Ottoman and Turkish politician, kaymakam of Yenice-i Vardar in 1900

== Volunteers in the Macedonian-Adrianopolitan Volunteer Corps from Giannitsa ==
- (Bulgaria) Delish (Denish) Andonov
- (Bulgaria) Nikola Antonov
- (Bulgaria) Trpko Arsov
- (Bulgaria) Trayko (Trayo) Atanasov
- (Bulgaria) Sotir Arabadzhiev
- (Bulgaria) Gotse Argirov
- (Bulgaria) Ivan Avramchev
- (Bulgaria) Ivan Avramov
- (Bulgaria) Georgi Chesmyanov
- (Bulgaria) Hristo Daylerov
- (Bulgaria) Atanas Petrov Demirev (Demirov)
- (Bulgaria) Hristo Dimitrov
- (Bulgaria) Krstyo (Krste) Dimitrov
- (Bulgaria) Vangel Dimitrov
- (Bulgaria) Toma Dionishev
- (Bulgaria) Andrey Dionisiev
- (Bulgaria) Toma (Tomo) Ivanov Durakov
- (Bulgaria) Dimitar Duvandzhiev
- (Bulgaria) Gligor Dzhadzhev
- (Bulgaria) Gligor Fotov
- (Bulgaria) Atanas Genchev (Natso Genchov)
- (Bulgaria) Dino Georgiev
- (Bulgaria) Ivan Georgiev
- (Bulgaria) Stavro Gerasimov
- (Bulgaria) Atanas Georgiev Goshev
- (Bulgaria) Haralambi Grigorov (Gligorov)
- (Bulgaria) Georgi (Grigor) Hadzhigaev
- (Bulgaria) Ivan Hadzhikostov
- (Bulgaria) Gotse Hadzhishanov
- (Bulgaria) Dimitar Hristov
- (Bulgaria) Georgi Hristov
- (Bulgaria) Grigor Hristov
- (Bulgaria) Stefan (Stefo) Hristov
- (Bulgaria) Bozhin Ivanov
- (Bulgaria) Gotse Ivanov
- (Bulgaria) Kosta K. Ivanov
- (Bulgaria) Teohar Ivanov
- (Bulgaria) Grigor Kalachov (Kalachev, Kalyachov)
- (Bulgaria) Dimitar Kostadinov
- (Bulgaria) Filip Kostadinov
- (Bulgaria) Filip Kostadinov
- (Bulgaria) Todor (Tone) Nikolov Kronev
- (Bulgaria) Petar Ivanov Krushkin
- (Bulgaria) Grigor (Gligor) Lazarov
- (Bulgaria) Toma Lyokov
- (Bulgaria) Toma Nikolov
- (Bulgaria) Mito Nushev
- (Bulgaria) Tushe Palaputsev
- (Bulgaria) Dimitar Perpelitsov
- (Bulgaria) Vangel Perpelitsov
- (Bulgaria) Hristo Popiliev
- (Bulgaria) Georgi Popstankov
- (Bulgaria) Dimitar Popstavrev
- (Bulgaria) Mihail Popstavrev
- (Bulgaria) Hristo T. Pozharliev
- (Bulgaria) Vangel (Geli) Pozharliev
- (Bulgaria) Grigor Sidzhimov
- (Bulgaria) Ivan Georgiev Srbov (Srbo)
- (Bulgaria) Krstyo D. Stavrev
- (Bulgaria) Ivan Tashev
- (Bulgaria) Tushi Talamputsov (Tolumputsov)
- (Bulgaria) Andon Traev
- (Bulgaria) Mitso Traykov
- (Bulgaria) Hristo Tsarchev
- (Bulgaria) Toma Tushiyanov

== Members of the Greek National Defense Committee of Giannitsa during the Macedonian Struggle ==
- (Greece) Christos Didaskalou (c. 1880 – 1907; Treasurer, then chairman of the committee; Hoplite)
- (Greece) Aristeidis Dovantzis (? – 1905; Agent 3rd Class)
- (Greece) Kiamil Gekas (Agent 3rd Class)
- (Greece) Dimitrios Grammatikos (Agent 2nd Class)
- (Greece) Evangelos Gotzamanis (Agent 2nd Class)
- (Greece) Nikolaos Hatzidimitrou (Agent 3rd Class)
- (Greece) Christos Hatzidimitriou (1847 – 1905; Agent 3rd Class)
- (Greece) Dimitrios Hatzigeorgiou (Agent 3rd Class)
- (Greece) Georgios Hatziteodorou (Agent 3rd Class)
- (Greece) Evangelos Ilidis
- (Greece) Ioannis Ingelizis (Hoplite)
- (Greece) Dimitrios Ioannidis or Liousis (Agent 3rd Class)
- (Greece) Georgios Karafilis (Agent 3rd Class)
- (Greece) Athanasios Karafilis (Agent 3rd Class)
- (Greece) Mihail Karamfilis (Agent 3rd Class)
- (Greece) Antonios Kasapis (c. 1880 – 1904; chairman of the committee; Agent 3rd Class)
- (Greece) Dimitrios Kasapis
- (Greece) Alkiviadis Kostomiris
- (Greece) Athanasios Lepidas (Agent 3rd Class)
- (Greece) Grigorios Liakis (Agent 3rd Class)
- (Greece) Dimitrios Liapchis
- (Greece) Stavros Liaptsis (Hoplite)
- (Greece) Trifon Mytonas (Agent 3rd Class)
- (Greece) Athanasios Oikonomou (1870 – 1906)
- (Greece) Dimitrios Oikonomou (? – 1909; Secretary of the committee)
- (Greece) Athanasios Organtzis (1848 – 1906)
- (Greece) Christos Papadimitriou or Fotinos (Agent 3rd Class)
- (Greece) Theofanis Papadimitriou (Agent 3rd Class)
- (Greece) Dimitrios Papadopoulos (Agent 2nd Class)
- (Greece) Argirios Papargiriou (Agent 3rd Class)
- (Greece) Grigorios Papastoitsis (Agent 3rd Class)
- (Greece) Nikolaos Petrousis (Agent 2nd Class)
- (Greece) Konstantinos Petsivas (Agent 3rd Class)
- (Greece) Georgios Revithiadis (Agent 3rd Class)
- (Greece) Thomas Revithiadis (Agent 3rd Class)
- (Greece) Hatzis Stoyiannis
- (Greece) Athanasios Tsakmakis (Agent 3rd Class)
- (Greece) Georgios Tsakmakis (Agent 3rd Class)
- (Greece) Konstantinos Tzaras (Agent 3rd Class)
- (Greece) Dimosthenis Vafopoulos (Agent 3rd Class)
- (Greece) Mihail Varelas (1887 – 1937; Agent 3rd Class)
- (Greece) Konstantinos Voudrislis (1884 – 1935; Hoplite)
- (Greece) Dionysios Yiotas (Agent 3rd Class)
- (Greece) Konstantinos Yiotas (Hoplite)
- (Greece) Vasileios Yiotas (Agent 3rd Class)
- (Greece) Sotirios Zografos (Agent 3rd Class)
- (Greece) Georgios Zografou (Agent 3rd Class)
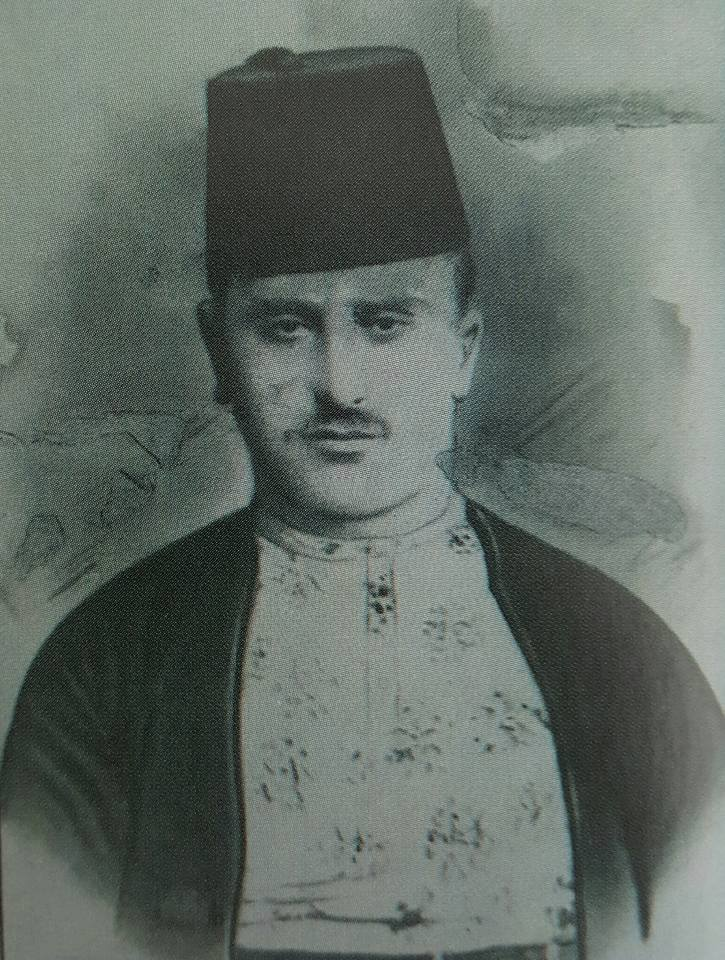
'Christos Didaskalou' was the treasurer of the committee. He was murdered in 1907

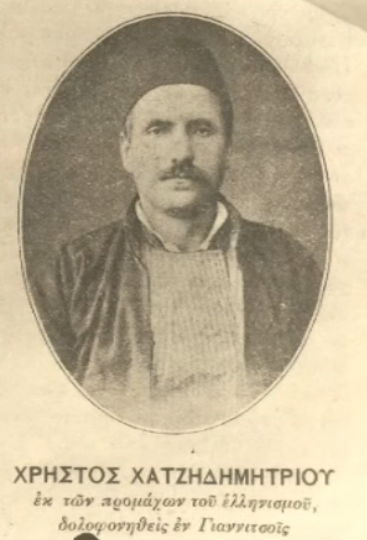
'Christos Hatzidimitriou' was a kodjabashi and trustee of the Greek schools in Giannitsa. He was murdered in 1905

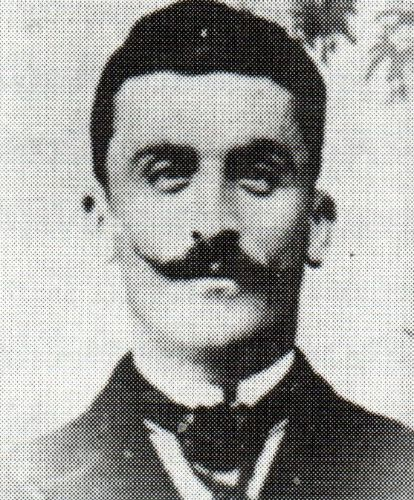
'Ioannis Ingelizis' served in the unit of Gonos Yiotas

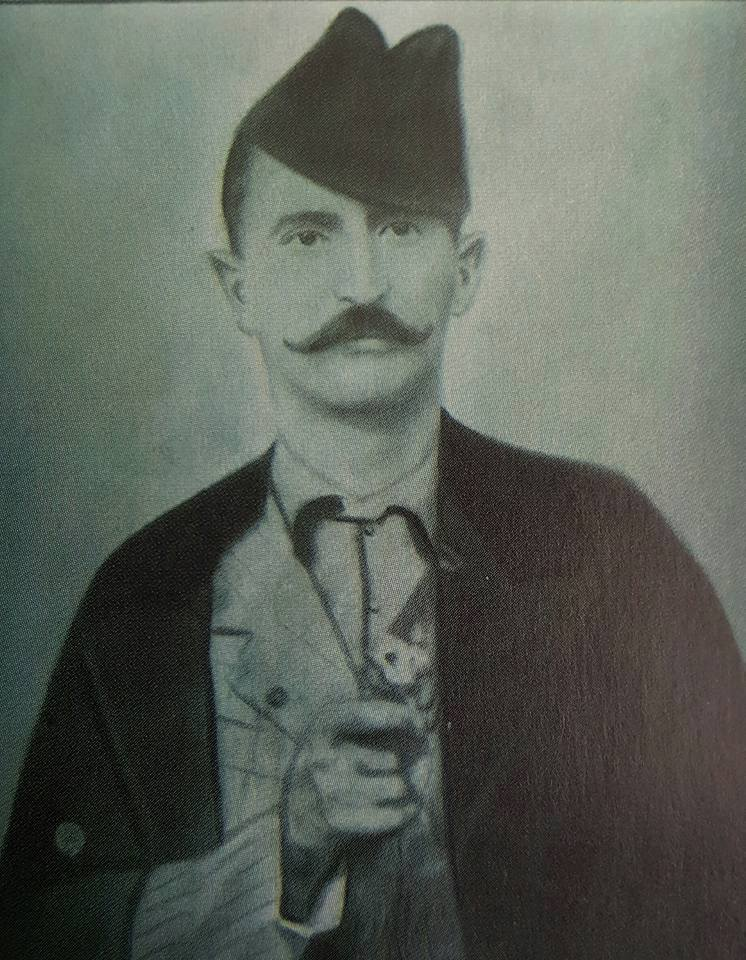
'Antonios Lepidas' was a member of the militia who was a supplier and messenger for Greek units

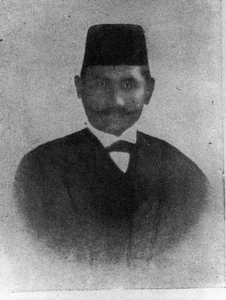
'Athanasios Oikonomou' was a member and son of the secretary of the committee. He was murdered in 1906

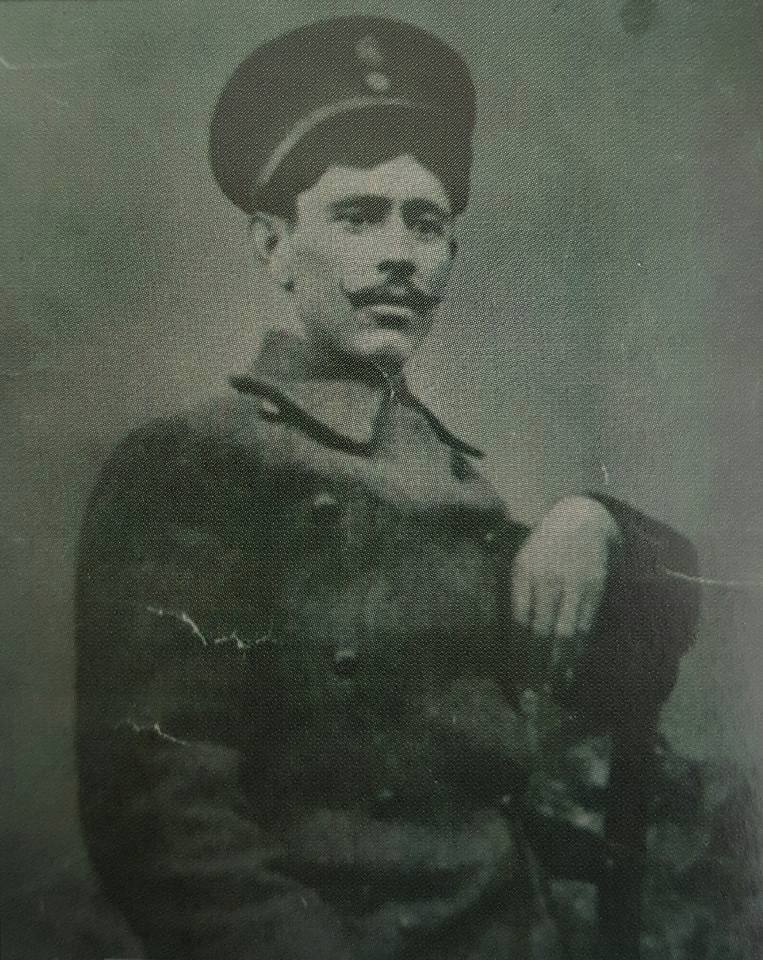
'Konstantinos Tzaras' was a guide and supplier to Greek units, he was imprisoned and tortured by the Ottomans and later fought in the Balkan Wars

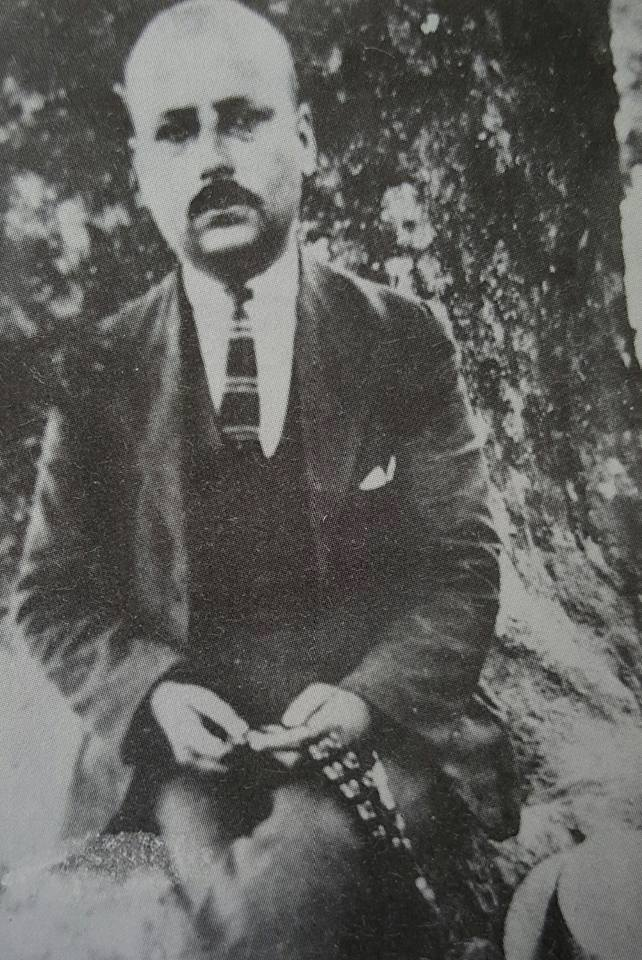
'Michail Varelas' was a messenger and supplier of the Greek units around Giannitsa and the surrounding villages

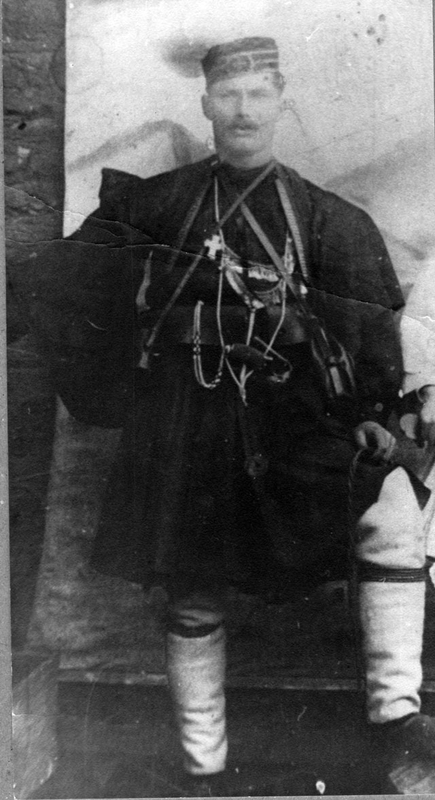
'Konstantinos Voudrislis' was a lieutenant of Gonos Yiotas
