= Logothetopoulos apartment building =

Historical building in Athens, Greece

Coordinates: 37.9887°N 23.7339°E

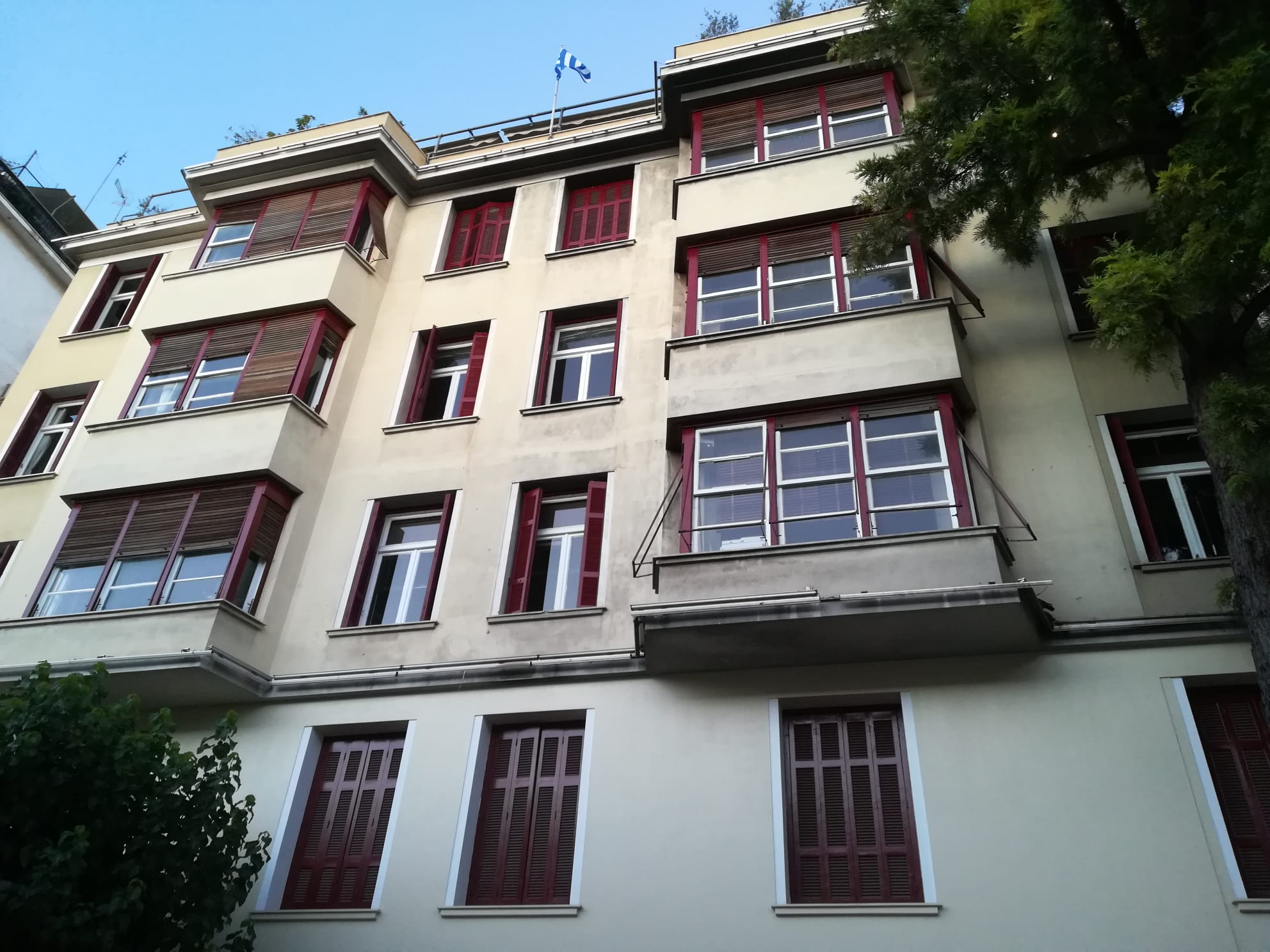
- Τhe facade of the building with its characteristic oriel windows.
- Interactive map of the Logothetopoulos apartment building area

The Logothetopoulos apartment building (today known as Ministry of Culture headquarters), located at 20–22 Bouboulinas Street in Exarchia, behind the National Archaeological Museum, is a landmark of interwar early modernism in Greece.

Constructed in 1932 for doctor Konstantinos Logothetopoulos - who eventually became Prime Minister during the Axis occupation - it was designed by architect and later NTUA professor Kyprianos Biris. Distinguished by its oriel windows and three internal courtyards, the building ensures excellent ventilation and lighting for its 46 apartments.

Today, it serves as the headquarters of the Greek Ministry of Culture. From the 1950s, the building housed the Greek Central Intelligence Agency (KYP) until the agency relocated to Katechaki Avenue, leaving the structure in disrepair. In the mid-1980s, the Communist Party of Greece (KKE) purchased it for 100 million drachmas, renovated it, and used it for its Athens offices. In 1992, the KKE sold the building to the Ministry of Culture for 1.17 billion drachmas, a sum deemed scandalous by the press at the time.
In 2013, the building was unexpectedly transferred to the Hellenic Republic Asset Development Fund (TAIPED) along with 27 other public properties. TAIPED sold it, forcing the Ministry to lease it back at a disproportionately high rental cost, in addition to significant maintenance expenses.

It is worth noting that the neighboring building at 18 Bouboulinas Street was a notorious structure in the history of modern Athens. During the Junta period, it housed the Athens Security Sub-Directorate. On the rooftop of the four-story building (which has since been demolished), brutal tortures of dissenting citizens were carried out by police officers.

== See also ==
- The Blue Condominium of Exarcheia
- Modern architecture in Athens
