= Sotirios Gotzamanis =

Greek politician (1884–1958)

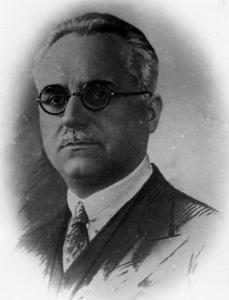
Photo of Gotzamanis

Sotirios Gotzamanis (Greek: Σωτήριος Γκοτζαμάνης; 1884 – 28 November 1958) was a Greek physician and politician.

== Early life ==
He was born in Giannitsa, Central Macedonia, which at the time of his birth was part of the Ottoman Empire. He studied medicine in Padua, Italy. In 1913, he moved to Thessaloniki when his home region became part of Greece in the aftermath of the Balkan Wars.

== Political career ==
From 1919 to 1936, he served in the Hellenic Parliament for the Thessaloniki-Pella constituency. He served as Minister of Health, Welfare and Care in the first government of Panagis Tsaldaris (1932–1933). In the parliamentary elections of 1936, he was leader of the National Reform Party.

=== Collaboration with the Axis Powers ===
After the German invasion of Greece, he supported collaboration with the Axis powers. On 30 April 1941 he was appointed minister of finance in the collaborationist government of Georgios Tsolakoglou. After the dismissal of Tsolakoglou on 2 December 1942, Gotzamanis continued in his post in the government of Konstantinos Logothetopoulos. His ministry also oversaw agriculture, industry, trade and labor. When Logothetopoulos was dismissed in 1943, the Italians favored him to succeed Logothetopoulos as Prime Minister of Greece, but the position went to Ioannis Rallis instead.

=== After the liberation of Greece ===
As the Axis forces withdraw from Greece in 1944, Gotzamanis fled to Italy and then Nazi Germany. In his absence, a Greek court sentenced him to death in January 1945 for treason. He returned to Greece several years later and was a candidate for mayor of Thessaloniki in 1954. He participated in the elections of 11 May 1958. He died 6 months later of a stroke and uremia at the age of 73. He is buried in Thessaloniki.

== Sources ==
- Γκοτζαμάνης, Σωτήριος (1954). Κατοχικόν δάνειον και δαπάναι Κατοχής. Θεσσαλονίκη.
- Μαρκέτος, Σπύρος (2006). Πώς φίλησα τον Μουσσολίνι! Τα πρώτα βήματα του ελληνικού φασισμού. Αθήνα: Βιβλιόραμα. pp. 95–96, 146. ISBN 978-960-8087-52-1.
- Marchetos, Spyros (2009). A Slav Macedonian Greek Fascist? Deciphering the Ethnicophrosyne of Sotirios Gotzamanis. Scribd. pp. 1–30. Aναπαραγωγή από το Alexandra Ioannidou και Christian Voß, ed. (2009). Spotlights on Russian and Balkan Slavic Cultural History. Μόναχο-Βερολίνο: Sagner. pp. 67–96. ISBN 978-3-86688-070-2.
- Μιχαηλίδης, Ιάκωβος (2001). Σωτήριος Γκοτζαμάνης: ο άνθρωπος, ο πολιτικός, ο μύθος. Θεσσαλονίκη: Βάνιας. ISBN 978-000-288041-1.
- "Απεβίωσεν ο Σ. Γκοτζαμάνης" (pdf). Μακεδονία (29 Νοεμβρίου 1958): 1.
- "Εκηδεύθη την Κυριακήν ο Σωτήριος Γκοτζαμάνης δαπάναις της Εταιρείας Μακεδονικών Σπουδών" (pdf). Μακεδονία (2 Δεκεμβρίου 1958): 7.

== Bibliography ==
- Μεγάλη Ελληνική Εγκυκλοπαίδεια. Vol. Β' συμπλήρ. Iδρυτής-Ιδιοκτήτης: Παύλος Δρανδάκης. Αθήνα: Φοίνιξ. p. 511.
- Βιογραφική Εγκυκλοπαίδεια του Νεωτέρου Ελληνισμού, 1830-2010. Vol. Α'. Αθήνα: Μέτρον.
