= National Reform Party (Greece) =

The National Reform Party (Greek: Μεταρρυθμιστικό Εθνικό Κόμμα) was a pro-fascist political party in Greece in the 1930s led by Sotirios Gotzamanis.

== History ==
The party first contested national elections in 1936, winning four seats in the Hellenic Parliament with 1.4% of the vote.

The 1936 elections were the last before World War II as a dictatorial regime took power in August, and the party did not return to contest elections following the war.
