= Hellenic State (1941–1944) =

1941–1944 puppet state of the Italy and Nazi Germany

Hellenic State Ἑλληνική Πολιτεία Elliniki Politeia
- 1941–1944
- Flag Coat of arms
- Motto: "Eleftheria i Thanatos"; Ελευθερία ή θάνατος "Freedom or Death"
- Anthem: "Imnos is tin Eleftherian"; Ὕμνος εἰς τὴν Ἐλευθερίαν "Hymn to Freedom"
- The Hellenic State in 1942
- Status: Puppet state of Italy and Germany(1941–1943); Puppet state of Germany (1943–1944); Government in exile (September–October 1944)
- Capital: Athens
- Common languages: Greek language
- Religion: Greek Orthodox
- Demonyms: Greek, Hellene
- Government: Fascist state under an occupation
- Plenipotentiary
  - 1941–1943: Günther Altenburg
  - 1943–1944: Hermann Neubacher
- Prime Minister
  - 1941–1942: Georgios Tsolakoglou
  - 1942–1943: Konstantinos Logothetopoulos
  - 1943–1944: Ioannis Rallis
- Historical era: World War II
  - Battle of Greece: 6 April 1941
  - Establishment: 30 April 1941
  - Battle of Crete: 20 May 1941
  - German withdrawal: 12 October 1944
- Currency: Greek drachma (₯)
Preceded by	Succeeded by
Kingdom of Greece (4th of August Regime)	Kingdom of Greece
- Today part of: Greece

The Hellenic State (Greek: Ελληνική Πολιτεία, romanized: Elliniki Politeia, lit. 'Greek State') was an Axis puppet state established during the Axis occupation in World War II; being a collaborator of Italy from 1941 to 1943 and of Nazi Germany from 1941 to 1944.

== History ==
=== Establishment ===
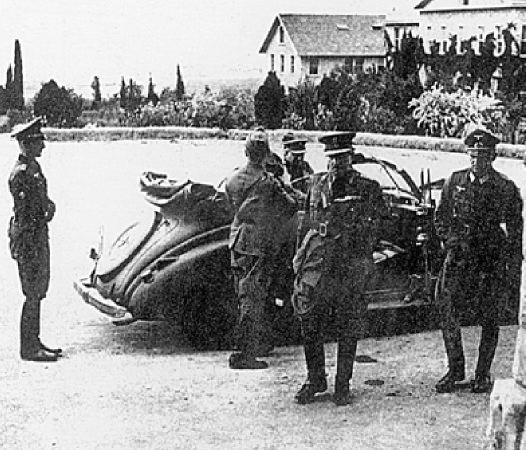
Georgios Tsolakoglou with Wehrmacht officers arrives at Macedonia Hall of Anatolia College in Thessaloniki, to sign the surrender (April 1941)

After the fall of Greece, a puppet government with General Georgios Tsolakoglou as its prime minister was installed on April 30, 1941. Tsolakoglou's main qualification for the position was that he surrendered to the Wehrmacht the week before, on April 20, against the express orders of his commanding officer Alexandros Papagos. As King George II with the legitimate Greek government-in-exile were in Crete, the new regime avoided all reference to the Greek monarchy and used Hellenic State as the country's official, generic, name. The collaborationist regime lacked a precise political definition, although Tsolakoglou, a republican officer, considered the Axis occupation as an opportunity to abolish the monarchy, and announced its end upon taking office.

The existence of a native Greek government was considered necessary by the Axis powers, in order to give some appearance of legitimacy to their occupation, although it was never given more than an ancillary role. The country's infrastructure had been ruined by the war. Raw materials and foodstuffs were requisitioned, and the government was forced to pay the cost of the occupation, giving rise to inflation. This was further exacerbated by a "war loan" Greece was forced to grant to Nazi Germany. Requisitions, together with the Allied blockade of Greece, resulted in the Great Famine (Greek: Μεγάλος Λιμός) during the winter of 1941–42, which caused the deaths of an estimated 300,000 people during the occupation.

==== Government and politics ====
The regime was first led by Georgios Tsolakoglou, however he was sacked a year later and replaced by Konstantinos Logothetopoulos, who himself was sacked in 1943. The last prime minister of the Hellenic State was Ioannis Rallis, who led the collaborationist regime until its dissolution in 1944. The Hellenic State was widely viewed as a puppet government and was unpopular with the Greek people.

==== Administrative divisions ====
Administratively, the Hellenic State was divided into a number of prefectures.

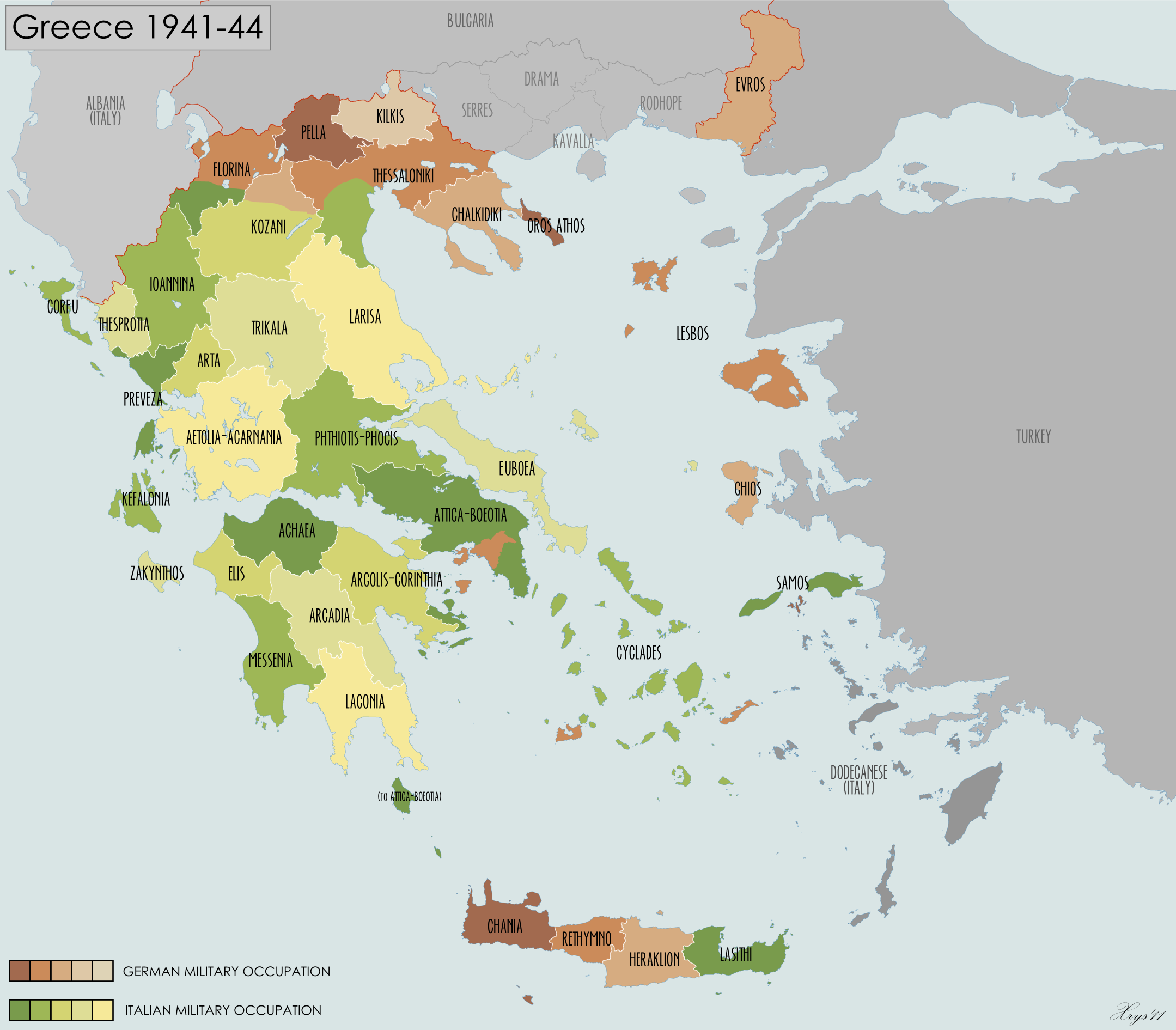
Map showing the prefectures of Greece and the Bulgarian annexation of Eastern Macedonia and Western Thrace

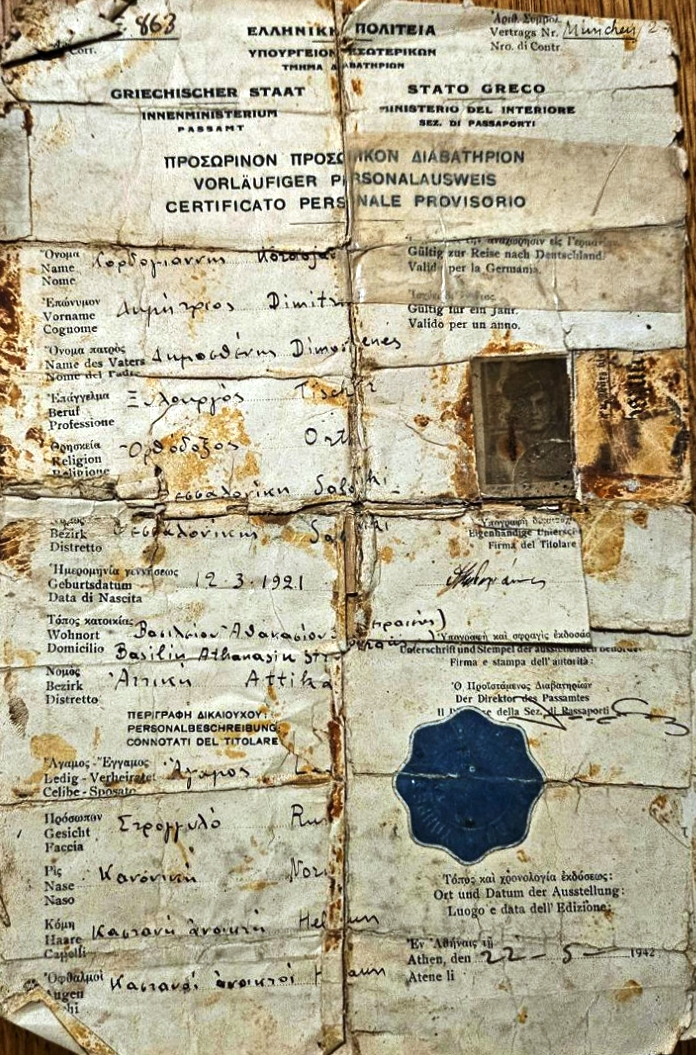
Temporary ID issued in occupied Athens by the Hellenic State, 1942.

=== Decline and fall ===
The Hellenic State lacked the infrastructure and latitude for action to face the great difficulties of the Occupation period; it was also devoid of any political legitimacy, and was widely considered a puppet government. Tsolakoglou demanded greater political rights for his government, and soon threatened to resign. By late 1942, the German and Italian occupation authorities had become dissatisfied with Tsolakoglou, who resigned on 1 December 1942 and was succeeded the following day by his deputy, Konstantinos Logothetopoulos. Under Logothetopoulos, German plans to mobilise Greek labour for work in Germany provoked widespread opposition. In early 1943, rumours of compulsory labour mobilisation sparked mass demonstrations and strikes in Athens, forcing the government to deny that such a measure was being contemplated.

Logothetopoulos was himself sacked on 6 April 1943. He was replaced by Ioannis Rallis, a monarchist politician. The Italians meanwhile had favored Finance Minister Sotirios Gotzamanis. Rallis, who was looking beyond the German withdrawal from Greece to the restoration of the post-war political order, and who was alarmed by the growth of the mostly Communist-dominated Greek resistance, obtained German consent for the creation of the Security Battalions, armed formations that were used in anti-partisan offensives.

==== Military ====
The Security Battalions setup by Rallis aided the German Army in fighting the resistance. They are known for committing atrocities against the civilian population. An officer named Georgios Bakos served as the minister of national defense.

==== Exile and trial ====
In September 1944, a new collaborationist government was established at Vienna, formed by former collaborationist ministers. It was headed by Ektor Tsironikos. It ceased to exist after the withdrawal of German forces and the liberation of the country in October 1944. Tsolakoglou, Rallis and Logothetopoulos (in Germany, where he had escaped to) were all arrested, along with hundreds of other collaborationists. The restored government set up the Trials of Collaborationists (I Diki ton Dosilogon) to judge collaborators. During 1945, Tsironikos was tried and sentenced to death. On 10 May 1945, he was arrested in Vienna by Allied forces and sent to Greece, where he was imprisoned. The government did not fulfil its promise to make major efforts to punish collaborators; this contributed to the escalation of political enmities in Greece, which in turn played a part in the outbreak of the Greek Civil War.

== Sources ==
- Mazower, Max (1993). Inside Hitler's Greece: The Experience of Occupation, 1941-44. Yale University Press. ISBN 9780300058048.
