= Āgehī =

Āgehī (died 1577 or 1578) was an Ottoman poet and historian.

== Biography ==
He was born in Yenice-i Vardar (modern Giannitsa) under the name Manṣūr. As a mudarris and qadi, he traveled to many places including Istanbul and Gallipoli. As a poet, he is famous for a qasida addressed to his sweetheart, a sailor, and is written with a large amount of nautical slang. Although he was well-known, his poetry was not collected into a diwan. In history, his Tarikh-i Ghazat-i Sigetwar describes Suleiman I's campaign on Szigetvár. No surviving manuscript is known.
