= Collaboration with the Axis powers =

Collaboration with the Axis powers may refer to:

- Collaboration with Nazi Germany and Fascist Italy
- Collaboration with the Empire of Japan
