= Georgios Tsolakoglou =

Prime Minister of Greece (1886–1948)

- Γεώργιος Τσολάκογλου
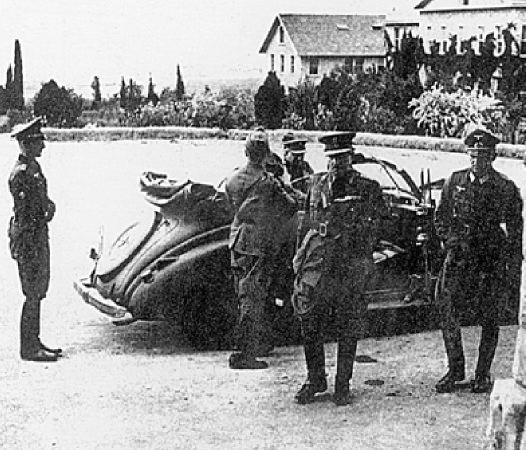
- Georgios Tsolakoglou (middle), c. 1941

Prime Minister of the Hellenic State
- In office 30 April 1941 – 2 December 1942
- Deputy: Konstantinos Logothetopoulos
- Preceded by: Office established
- Succeeded by: Konstantinos Logothetopoulos

Personal details
- Born: April 1886 Rentina, Kingdom of Greece
- Died: 22 May 1948 (aged 62) Athens, Kingdom of Greece
- Occupation: Politician
- Profession: Soldier

Military service
- Allegiance: Kingdom of Greece; Second Hellenic Republic; Hellenic State
- Branch/service: Hellenic Army
- Rank: Lieutenant General
- Commands: Western Macedonia Army Section; Epirus Army Section
- Battles/wars: Balkan Wars; First Balkan War; Battle of Sarantaporo; Battle of Yenidje; Second Balkan War; Battle of Kilkis; Battle of Dzumaya; World War I; Macedonian front; Russian Civil War; Allied intervention; Southern Front; Southern Russia Intervention; Soviet Invasion of Ukraine; Greco-Turkish War; World War II; Greco-Italian War; Battle of Greece

Georgios Tsolakoglou (Greek: Γεώργιος Τσολάκογλου; April 1886 – 22 May 1948) was a Greek army officer who headed the government of Greece from 1941 to 1942, in the early phase of the country's occupation by Axis powers during World War II.

An officer of the Hellenic Army, Tsolakoglou was a veteran of the Balkan Wars, World War I and the Greco-Turkish War of 1919–1922. After Greece was overrun following a German invasion in 1941, Tsolakoglou, then a lieutenant general, offered the surrender of the Hellenic Army to the Wehrmacht. In April, he was appointed Prime Minister of the puppet government, which was beset by corruption and infighting from the start. Tsolakoglou's popularity plunged further following the Italian takeover of the occupation, as well as Bulgaria's annexation of Northern Greece. He was unable to alleviate Germany's large-scale plunder of the country, which led to the Great Famine that resulted in the deaths of nearly 300,000 Greeks.

Tsolakoglou remained head of the government until December 1942, when he was dismissed and replaced by Konstantinos Logothetopoulos. After the liberation of Greece, he was arrested, tried and sentenced to death. His sentence was ultimately commuted to life imprisonment, and he died in prison of leukaemia in 1948.

== Early life and ancestors ==
Georgios Tsolakoglou was born in Rentina, Thessaly, in April 1886. He was of Aromanian origins and spoke Aromanian. He was the grandson of Dimitrios Tsolakoglou, the proestos of Agrafa (1775-1822) and later in life a Greek War of Independence fighter and a Filiki Eteria member. Dimitrios Tsolakoglou was a controversial figure, seen by some sources (including Georgios Karaiskakis) as a Turkophile, an ally of Ali Pasha, and responsible for the deaths of several Greek rebels, notably Antonis Katsantonis. He was eventually arrested by Ottoman authorities, charged with treason and executed along with his son, Konstantinos Tsolakoglou, on the orders of Hurshid Pasha in 1822.

== Military career ==
=== Early career ===
As an officer in the Hellenic Army, Tsolakoglou participated in the Balkan Wars, World War I, the 1919 Allied intervention in the Russian Civil War and the Asia Minor Campaign.

=== Greco-Italian War ===
With the rank of Lieutenant General, he led the Western Macedonia Army Section in the Greco-Italian War. After the German invasion and capture of Thessaloniki on 9 April 1941, the withdrawal of WMAS from Northern Epirus was belatedly ordered on 12 April. The German motorized units, however, succeeded in reaching the vital Metsovon Pass on 18 April, overcame local Greek resistance and captured Ioannina on the following day, thereby effectively cutting off the Hellenic Army.

=== Initiative to surrender the Greek army in Epirus ===
When the hopelessness of resistance became apparent, Tsolakoglou, along with several other senior generals began considering surrendering to the Germans. Thus, on 20 April, with the cooperation of the commanders of I Corps, Lt. Gen. Panagiotis Demestichas and II Corps, Lt. Gen. Georgios Bakos, and the metropolitan of Ioannina, Spyridon, he relieved and replaced Lt. Gen. Ioannis Pitsikas, the commander of the Epirus Army Section. He immediately sent messengers to the Germans proposing surrender, and on the same day signed a surrender protocol with the commander of the Leibstandarte SS Adolf Hitler brigade, SS-Obergruppenführer Sepp Dietrich.

Despite urgent orders by Greek Commander-in-chief Alexandros Papagos, that he be relieved and resistance continued to the last, the next day, at Larissa, the surrender was formalized, with Tsolakolglou signing the unconditional surrender of the Hellenic Army to the Germans. The protocol made – deliberately – no reference to the other invading Axis partner, Italy, whom the Greeks considered to have defeated and wished to, in the words of John Keegan, "...deny the Italians the satisfaction of a victory they had not earned..." However, at Benito Mussolini's insistence, the surrender ceremony was repeated a third time to include Italian representatives on 23 April.

On 26 April 1941, Tsolakoglou wrote a letter to Adolf Hitler, whom he referred to as the "Führer of the German People" proclaiming his willingness to head a collaborationist government, which he promised would consist of senior generals. At the time, Athens had not fallen and the British Expeditionary Force consisting of a division each from Australia and New Zealand plus a British armored brigade together with the rest of the Royal Hellenic Army were retreating into the Peloponnese to be rescued by the Royal Navy, to take them to Crete. Hitler called Tsolakoglou's letter "a gift from Heaven", and immediately accepted his offer, believing it would hasten the fall of Greece. What Hitler wanted in Greece was a government that would obey German orders and ensure that the majority of the work in administering Greece on behalf of the Reich be done by Greeks rather than Germans. As the majority of the Greek civil servants, judges, and policemen who had served the 4th of August Regime were willing to obey orders from Tsolakoglou's government, this was exactly what Hitler wanted as he preferred to occupy Greece lightly in order to free up manpower for the invasion of the Soviet Union, which was scheduled for later in the spring of 1941. Hitler's first choice for heading a collaborationist government in Greece would have been the legal government headed by King George II and Prime Minister Emmanouil Tsouderos, but as the government had retreated to Crete to continue the struggle, Tsolakoglou was considered a satisfactory substitute.

Tsolakoglou himself wrote in his memoirs: "I found myself before a historic dilemma: To allow the fight to continue and have a holocaust or, obeying the pleas of the Army's commanders, to assume the initiative of surrendering.... Having made my decision to dare, I did not consider responsibilities.... Until today I have not regretted my actions. On the contrary, I feel proud."

== Prime Minister of the collaborationist government ==
=== Cabinet ===
On 30 April 1941, Tsolakoglou was appointed Prime Minister of a collaborationist government by the Axis occupation authorities. Several other generals who had served in the Greco-Italian War became members of the Tsolakoglou government, such as Generals Panagiotis Demestichas and Georgios Bakos. Archbishop Chrysanthus of Athens refused to swear in Tsolakoglou as prime minister, and was replaced as archbishop by Damaskinos of Athens, who proved more willing to administer the necessary oaths to Tsolakoglou and his cabinet. The narrowness of Tsolakoglou's support was reflected in the composition of his cabinet, which consisted of six other generals, the professor of medicine Konstantinos Logothetopoulos, whose principal qualification for office seemed to be was that he was married to the niece of Field Marshal Wilhelm List, and a shady, disreputable businessman Platon Hadzimikalis, whose main qualification for office was that he had many connections with German businesses and was considered to be a clever man. As a cabinet minister, Hadzimikalis turned out to be so corrupt that his wife eventually left him (divorce was not legal in Greece at the time), saying she could not in good conscience go on living with a man who was enriching himself by plundering the public coffers at a time when thousands of Greeks were starving to death.

=== Italian occupation ===
Tsolakoglou attempted to prevent an Italian occupation of Greece, telling Günther Altenburg of the German Foreign Office that the Greeks knew that Germany had defeated Greece, but also that Greece had defeated Italy, and that the Greek people would find an Italian occupation deeply humiliating. Tsolakoglou wanted Germany to take control of Greece entirely. He warned of a collapse in law and order in Greece if the Italians arrived and behaved "like tyrants". In a letter to Hitler, Tsolakoglou warned that allowing the Italians to occupy Greece would "completely undermine the authority of the Greek government". Both the German Foreign Office and the Wehrmacht supported Tsolakoglou, saying that Greece could be occupied by minimal German forces if only the Italians were kept out. On 13 May 1941, Hitler ordered the majority of the Wehrmacht forces out of Greece to redeploy them for Operation Barbarossa, to be replaced by the Italians. At the time, Hitler said: "It is none of our business whether the Italian occupation troops can cope with the Greek government or not" as the "German-Italian relationship was of paramount importance". Under the terms of the armistice, the Germans took the strategically important areas such as the Athens area; Thessaloniki and the surrounding area in Greek Macedonia; Crete; the border area with Turkey; and some of the Aegean islands, while leaving the rest of Greece to be occupied by the Italians and the Bulgarians.

=== Bulgarian annexation of northern Greece ===
The handing over of part of Macedonia and Thrace to the Bulgarians, the traditional archenemies of the Greeks, ruined the limited amount of legitimacy that the Tsolakoglou government possessed. The fact that the Bulgarians immediately annexed these territories and began expelling Greek officials and ordinary citizens while Tsolakoglou was reduced to writing letters to German and Italian officials fruitlessly asking them to stop the expulsions contributed to his unpopularity and undermined his claim to be protecting the Greeks. Tsolakoglou's opposition to the Bulgarian occupation of Greek Macedonia and Thrace led him to take a tour of northern Greece in the summer of 1942 where he told Greek refugees expelled by the Bulgarians: "Hitler abhors the idea of servitude. He will not allow us to lose any territory! Have heart, you refugees from East Macedonia and Thrace, you will soon return". Tsolakoglou ended his speeches with the phrase "Long live a greater Greece!", which reflected his belief that if he was sufficiently subservient enough, then Hitler would reward him by allowing a "greater Greece" to be created.

=== Economic policies and the Great Famine ===
Tsolakoglou's attempts to alleviate the suffering caused by the ruthless German economic exploitation of Greece were completely ineffective. Likewise his attempts to stop the black market from becoming the main form of economic activity were a complete failure. To combat the black market, on 8 May 1941 Tsolakoglou announced the establishment of special courts with powers to impose the death penalty with no appeal on black marketeers whom he accused of hoarding food. The decree did not end the problem of food hoarding and instead Greece experienced what Greeks call the Great Famine in 1941-42 that killed about 300,000 Greeks as the German occupation authorities continue the requisition of food with no thought for the Greek people. The officials of the Hellenic State gathered up the dead and dumped them into mass graves. Many Greeks at the time believed that those buried in unconsecrated ground would turn into vampire-like creatures known as vrykolakas, leading to complaints that the Hellenic State have failed the living by allowing them to starve to death had now also failed them in death, as many feared the corpses dumped into the mass graves would return as vrykolakas to haunt the living.

As the famine proceeded, for many Greeks it seemed that society was breaking down as hundreds of emaciated corpses of those who starved to death lay rotting on the streets while for most ordinary people life became reduced down to desperate, almost primeval struggle to find enough food to keep themselves and their loved ones alive for one more day. According to a study done by the Hellenic State's Ministry of Health in late 1942, during the Great Famine years of 1941–1942, for the first time in modern history, the population of Athens declined. In Athens, the daily death rate rose from 12 deaths per 1, 000 people in 1940 to 39 deaths per 1, 000 people in 1942 while the daily birth rate declined from 15 births per 1,000 people in 1940 to 9 births per 1, 000 people in 1942. During World War II, about 555,000 Greeks making up 8% of the population perished, with the Great Famine being the largest cause of death. The inability of Tsolakoglou's government, which had promised to protect the Greek people from the occupation by giving Greece a role in the "New Order in Europe", to do anything to change German policies completely discredited the Hellenic State.

=== Goals ===
The Tsolakoglou government aimed to release Greek POWs and help the victims of the war. Additionally, it aimed to mitigate the effects of the Great Famine, to keep the private and public economy functioning by strengthening the agricultural and industrial economy, to restore public transport in the country and to ensure order and security.

==== Attempts to create a Greek SS unit ====
Tsolakoglou and Georgios Bakos attempted to create a Schutzstaffel unit composed by volunteer Greeks, in order to help the Germans fight against the Soviet Union. However, such attempts failed.

=== Downfall ===
By mid-November 1942, both the Italians and Germans had felt that Tsolakoglou had become "untrustworthy" and that it was better to let him go. His prickly sense of Greek nationalism led Tsolakoglou to demand that the Hellenic State be treated as an equal in the "New Order in Europe" instead of the subordinate role that the Germans and Italians saw it as playing.

Tsolakoglou remained as head of the government until 2 December 1942, when he retired, citing health issues, and was replaced by Konstantinos Logothetopoulos. Altenburg had long wanted to replace Tsolakoglou with the veteran politician Ioannis Rallis, but he demurred for the moment following the Allied victory at the Second Battle of El Alamein, which ended the Axis hopes of conquering Egypt, leading to Logothetopoulos to be appointed instead. Altenburg considered Tsolakoglou to be a stupid and clumsy leader, and wanted a mainstream Greek politician to assume the leadership of the Hellenic State to give it more legitimacy and competent leadership.

== Trial and imprisonment ==
After Greece regained independence, Tsolakoglou was arrested, tried by a Special Collaborators Court in 1945 and sentenced to death. His sentence was ultimately commuted to life imprisonment, and he died in prison of leukaemia in 1948.

== Notes ==
Political offices
Preceded by Emmanouil Tsouderos as legitimate Prime Minister leading government-in-exile	Prime Minister of Greece (Collaborationist government); 30 April 1941 – 2 December 1942	Succeeded by Konstantinos Logothetopoulos
