= Konstantinos Logothetopoulos =

Greek doctor and prime minister (1878–1961)

- Κωνσταντίνος Λογοθετόπουλος

Prime Minister of the Hellenic State
- In office 2 December 1942 – 7 April 1943
- Preceded by: Georgios Tsolakoglou
- Succeeded by: Ioannis Rallis

Personal details
- Born: 1878 Nafplion, Kingdom of Greece
- Died: 6 July 1961 (aged 82) Athens, Kingdom of Greece
- Occupation: Politician
- Profession: Physician

Konstantinos Logothetopoulos (Greek: Κωνσταντίνος Λογοθετόπουλος; 1878 – 6 July 1961) was a Greek medical doctor who became Prime Minister of Greece, directing the Greek collaborationist government during the Axis occupation of Greece during World War II.

== Early life ==
Logothetopoulos was born in Nafplion in 1878.

== Education and career ==
Logothetopoulos studied medicine in Munich and remained in the German Empire, practicing and teaching medicine until 1910, at which time he relocated to Athens. In Greece, he founded a private clinic and served in both the First Balkan War (1912–1913) and the Second Balkan War (1913) as a doctor. He was discharged in 1916, resuming private medical practice until 1922 when he was again conscripted during the Greco-Turkish War to serve in the Army Hospital of Athens.

After the end of the war in 1922, Logothetopoulos became professor of gynaecology at the National and Kapodistrian University of Athens. Eventually he became Dean of the University. During his tenure at the university, he taught and assisted many young doctors in their studies including future politician Grigoris Lambrakis.

When Greece capitulated to Nazi Germany after the "Battle of Greece" during World War II, Logothetopoulos, who spoke the German language fluently, had been the chairman of the Greek-German Council and was married to the niece of Field Marshal Wilhelm List, was appointed Vice President and Minister of Education in the first collaborationist government of Gen. Georgios Tsolakoglou. After Tsolakoglou was removed from office, he served as Prime Minister between 2 December 1942 and 7 April 1943, when he was replaced by Ioannis Rallis. His short tenure was marked by the start of the deportation of Greek Jewry, in which he played an ambiguous role.

When the Wehrmacht left Greece in 1944, Logothetopoulos went with them to Nazi Germany. He lived with his wife and daughter in the small Bavarian town of Vilshofen an der Donau, where he practiced medicine. Eventually he was captured by the United States Army which surrendered him to Greek authorities in 1946. He was tried and convicted of collaborating with the enemy and initially sentenced to life imprisonment, but was released in 1951.

== Death ==
Logothetopoulos died in Athens on 6 July 1961.

== See also ==
- Logothetopoulos apartment building

Political offices
Preceded by Georgios Tsolakoglou	Prime Minister of Greece (Collaborationist government); 2 December 1942 – 7 April 1943	Succeeded by Ioannis Rallis
