= Giannis Galoupis =

Greek footballer

Personal information
- Full name: Ioannis Galoupis
- Date of birth: 15 February 2000 (age 26)
- Place of birth: Giannitsa, Greece
- Height: 1.77 m (5 ft 10 in)
- Position: Left-back

Team information
- Current team: Kalamata
- Number: 3

Youth career
- 2014–2019: Olympiacos

Senior career*
Years	Team	Apps	(Gls)
2019–	Kalamata	5	(0)

International career^{‡}
2016	Greece U16	2	(0)
2018	Greece U18	3	(0)
2017–2018	Greece U19	4	(0)
- * Club domestic league appearances and goals as of 27 October 2019 ‡ National team caps and goals as of 30 June 2018

Giannis Galoupis (Greek: Γιάννης Γαλούπης; born 15 February 2000) is a Greek professional footballer who plays as a left-back for Football League club Kalamata.
